= Whiteleaved Oak =

Hamlet in Herefordshire, England

Coordinates: 52.021°N 2.351°W

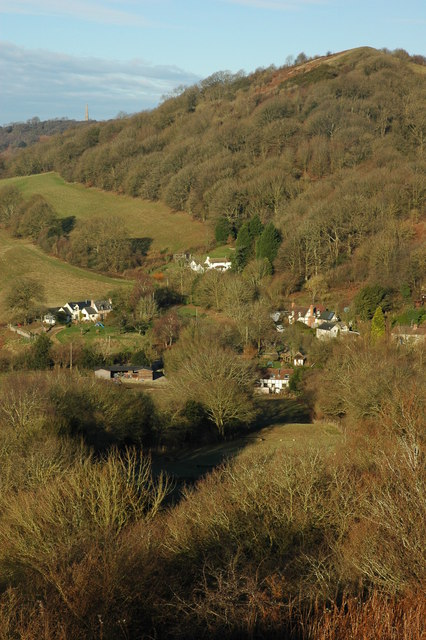
- Whiteleaved Oak and Raggedstone Hill

- Location within Herefordshire
- OS grid reference: SO760359
- District: Malvern Hills
- Shire county: Herefordshire
- Region: West Midlands
- Country: England
- Sovereign state: United Kingdom
- Postcode district: HR8
- Police: West Mercia
- Fire: Hereford and Worcester
- Ambulance: West Midlands

Whiteleaved Oak is a hamlet in the English county of Herefordshire, lying in a valley at the southern end of the Malvern Hills between Raggedstone Hill and Chase End Hill where the counties of Herefordshire, Worcestershire and Gloucestershire meet. It was home to a 500-year-old oak tree, which was thought to be sacred. On 9 July 2020, the tree was destroyed by a fire which broke out due to lanterns being hung on its branches.

== Toponymy ==
In 1584 Henry Dingley, a verderer of Malvern Chase, wrote an account of a perambulation of the chase boundaries. Dingley noted that near the southernmost boundary of the chase grew "...a geate Oake caulled the white leved Oake [which] bereth white leaves."

In The forest and chace of Malvern, its ancient & present state: with notices of the most remarkable old trees remaining within its confines (1877) Edwin Lees wrote:

The "White-leaved Oak" valley between the Ragged-stone and Keysend-hills, keeps in its name the memory of an oak that existed there within memory, whose leaves being variegated with white blotches, caused it to be considered a curiosity and prodigy.

== In cultural life ==
In The Ley Hunter's Companion (1979) Paul Devereux suggested that a 10-mile alignment he called the "Malvern Ley" passed through St Ann's Well, the Wyche Cutting, a section of the Shire Ditch, Midsummer Hill, Whiteleaved Oak, Redmarley D'Abitot and Pauntley.

In City of Revelation (1973) British author John Michell suggested that Whiteleaved Oak is the centre of a circular alignment he called the “Circle of Perpetual Choirs” and is equidistant from Glastonbury and Stonehenge. The suggestion was investigated by the British Society of Dowsers and used as background material by Phil Rickman in his novel The Remains of an Altar (2006).

In Tales From Whiteleaved Oak, Brian Haynes of Whiteleaved Oak has detailed local folklore, gossip and history which he has combined with developments in climate change. The book references the decagon theory of John Michell, and describes how John Gibson-Forty, a dowser, followed each of the 10 ley lines from their centre at Whiteleaved Oak that form the decagon.

Before its destruction, the oak tree was a finalist in the 'Tree of the Year' competition run by the Woodland Trust in 2014.
