= Worcestershire Beacon =

Hill in the Malvern Hills, England

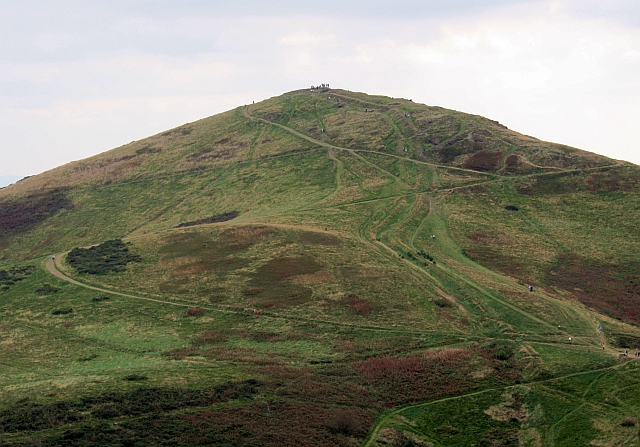
- Worcestershire Beacon from North Hill

Highest point
- Elevation: 425 m (1,394 ft)
- Prominence: c. 337 metres (1,106 ft)
- Parent peak: Hergest Ridge
- Listing: Marilyn, Hardy, County Top
- Coordinates: 52°06′17″N 2°20′25″W

Geography
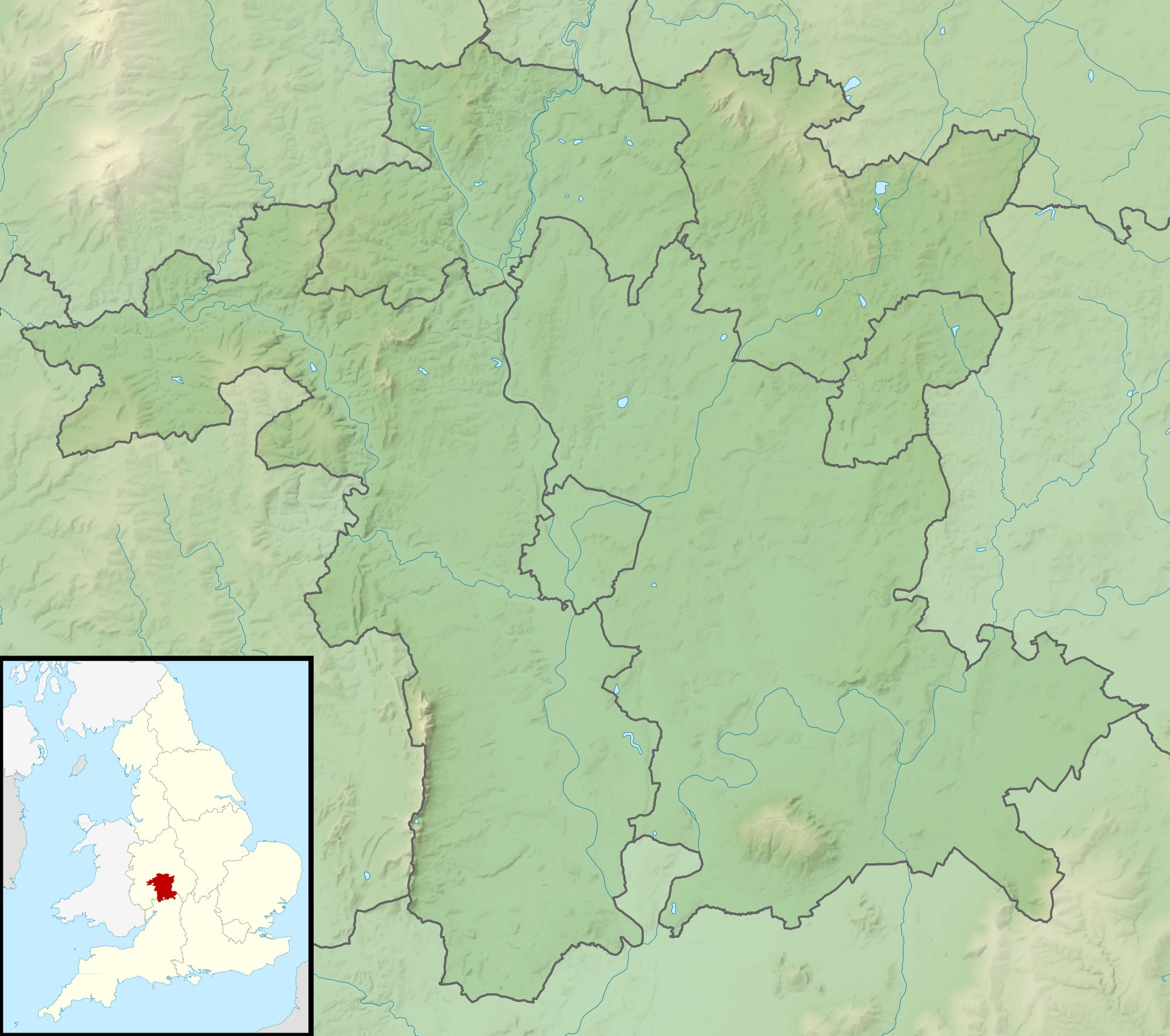
- Location within Worcestershire
- Location: Malvern Hills, England
- OS grid: SO768452
- Topo map: OS Landranger 150

Geology
- Rock age: Pre-Cambrian
- Mountain type(s): Igneous, Metamorphic

Climbing
- Easiest route: Hiking

Worcestershire Beacon, also popularly known as Worcester Beacon, or locally simply as The Beacon, is a hill whose summit at 425 metres (1,394 ft) is the highest point in Worcestershire. It is part of the Malvern Hills which run about 13 kilometres (8.1 mi) north-south along the Herefordshire-Worcestershire border.

The hills are managed by the Malvern Hills Conservators under five Acts of Parliament of 1884, 1909, 1924, 1930, and 1995 whose aim is to preserve the nature and environment landscape of the area and to protect it from encroachments. The Beacon is highly popular with walkers with its easily reached dense network of footpaths crisscrossing it and the area has been designated by the Countryside Agency as an Area of Outstanding Natural Beauty.

== Toponymy ==
The name Beacon comes from the use of the hill as a signalling beacon. Lord Macaulay included the Beacon in his poem Armada, which describes the chain of warning fires which were lit when the Spanish Armada attempted to invade England in 1588:

And on, and on, without a pause, untired they bounded still
All night from tower to tower they sprang; they sprang from hill to hill
Till the proud Peak unfurled the flag o’er Darwin's rocky dales
Till like volcanoes flared to heaven the stormy hills of Wales,
Till twelve fair counties saw the blaze on Malvern's lonely height,

Till streamed in crimson on the wind the Wrekin's crest of light.

== Geography ==
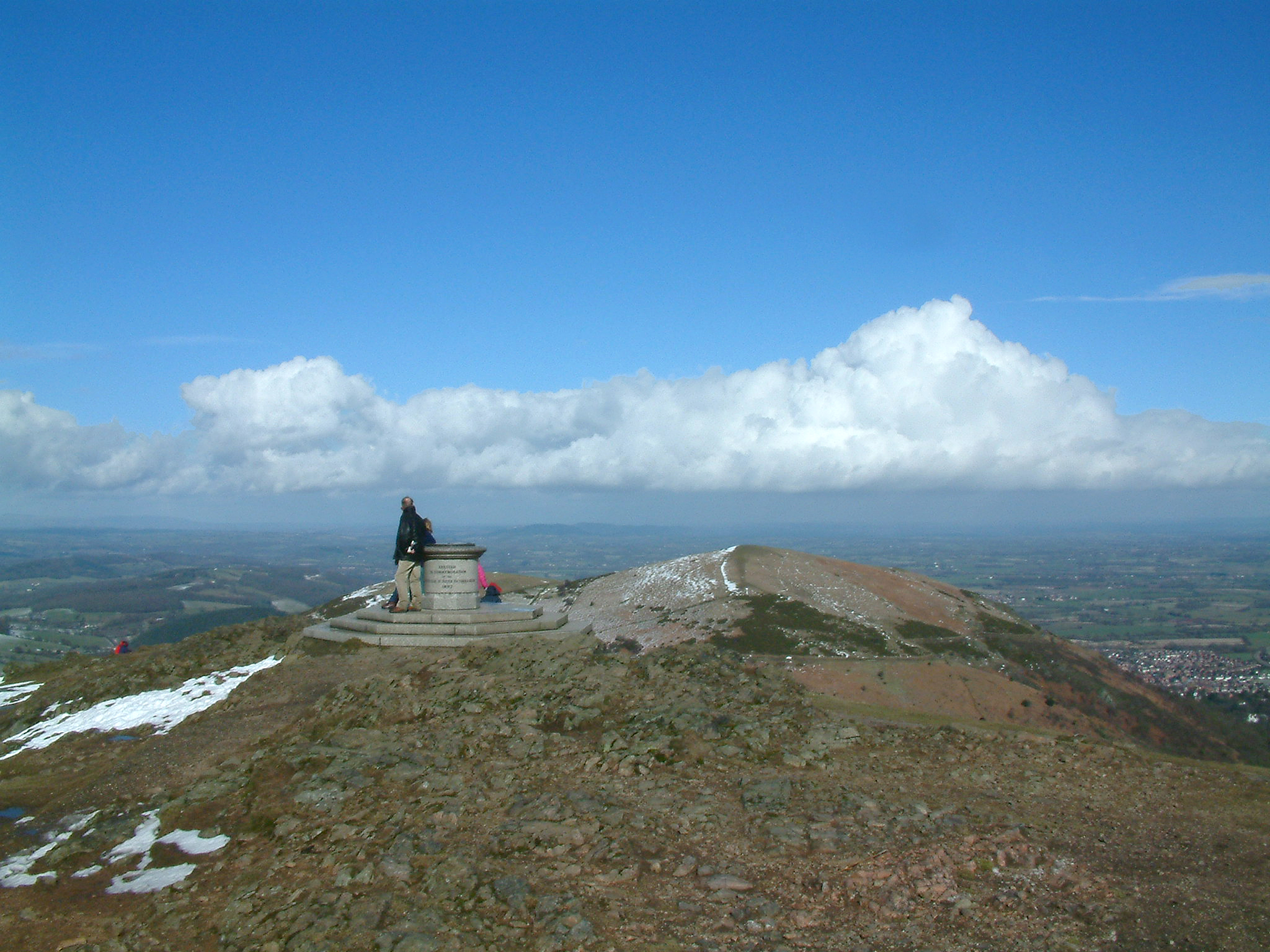
Toposcope on Worcestershire Beacon, with North Hill beyond

The steep eastern flank of the hill begins immediately behind Bellevue Terrace, one of the two main shopping streets in the town centre of Great Malvern from where its summit is a brisk 35 – 40 minutes steep walk via St Ann's Well or Happy Valley. It can also be accessed by a short, steep, unpathed climb from Jubilee Drive on the western side, or reached by a more leisurely stroll along the crest of the ridge from a car park near the Wyche Cutting, a mile or so to the south of the town centre.

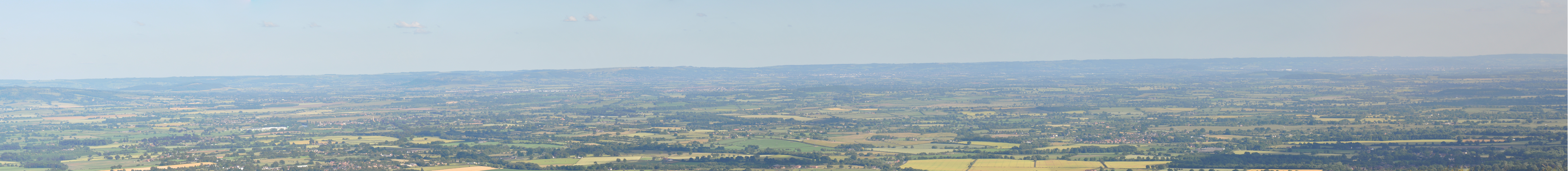
Panorama looking towards Cheltenham and Gloucester from summit

== Geology ==
The hills are mostly igneous and metamorphic rocks from the late pre-Cambrian, around 600 million years old and the Beacon is part of the watershed that permits the rise of the mineral springs and wells of the famous Malvern water that is bottled commercially on a large scale and sold worldwide, and they were responsible for the development of Malvern from a village to a busy spa town in the early 19th century. Hundreds of millions of years of erosion and glacial passage have given the Beacon and its neighbouring peaks their characteristic smoothly rounded features.

== History ==
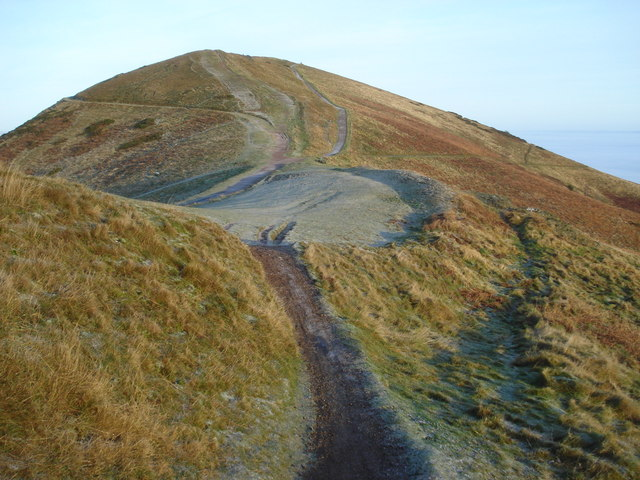
The Shire Ditch forms a shallow trough just to the right of the ridge all the way to the top of the Beacon

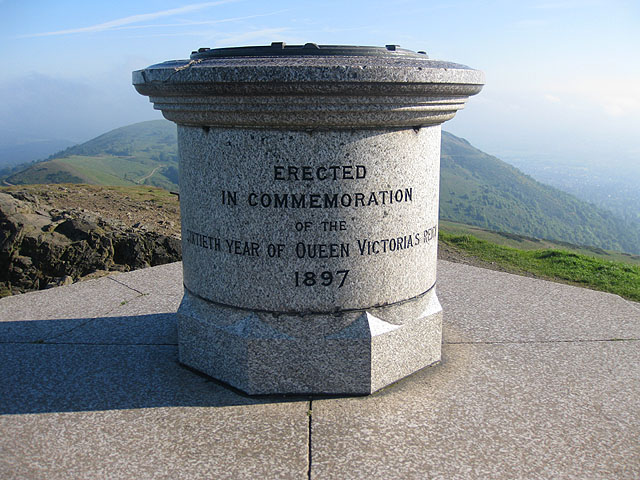
Diamond Jubilee Toposcope. Designed by Arthur Troyte Griffith and erected to commemorate Queen Victoria's Diamond Jubilee in 1897

The hill itself appears to mark the northern terminal of the Shire Ditch, or Red Earl's Dyke, which runs north and south of the British Camp along the ridge of the hills. It was created in 1287 by Gilbert de Clare, the Earl of Gloucester, following a boundary dispute with Thomas de Cantilupe, the Bishop of Hereford. Recent research has shown that the Shire Ditch might actually be much older. Indeed, there is some evidence that it may have started life as a prehistoric trackway running from Worcestershire Beacon to Midsummer Hillfort. The hill is also the site of two Bronze Age burials. In 1849 two urns containing bones and ashes were uncovered by Private Harkiss whilst conducting work for the Ordnance Survey and documented by Edwin Lees, a local antiquarian. The remains were attributed to the Middle Bronze Age and are now housed in the British Museum.

The Worcestershire Beacon has historically been used as a location for signalling beacons. In 1588 it formed part of a chain of warning fires which were lit when the Spanish Armada attempted to invade England. Beacon fires were also lit to celebrate national occasions including the end of the Crimean War (1856), the marriage of the Prince and Princess of Wales (1863), the Golden Jubilee of Queen Victoria (1887) and Diamond Jubilee (1897) the coronation of George V (1911) and the Coronation of Queen Elizabeth II (1953). In recent years it has been used as a beacon for special occasions such as the millennium night of 31 December 1999 when a large fire was lit as part of a nationwide network of hill top beacons to celebrate the event. A beacon fire was also lit on the Worcestershire Beacon on 3 June 2002 to celebrate the Golden Jubilee of Elizabeth II, on 4 June 2012 to celebrate the Diamond Jubilee of Elizabeth II. and on 3 June 2022 to celebrate the Platinum Jubilee of Elizabeth II.

During World War II the Beacon was used as a fire lookout point for air raids on Birmingham and Coventry, and in the latter half of the 20th century it was used regularly as a location for a BBC transmitter relay van for covering horse racing and sports events in Worcester.

=== Beacon cafe ===
A café that had existed on the summit for many decades was destroyed by fire in 1989. As the Malvern Hills Acts state that no building should be erected on the Conservators' land or on land under their jurisdiction, the Conservators put a bill through Parliament to get the power to build a new one but the House of Lords opposed it. When the cafe was burned down, the Conservators had plans to replace the building but were advised that they risked prosecution for rebuilding as the original cafe building was an encroachment on common land. The Malvern Hills Bill was in preparation to modernise some of the clauses in previous acts a clause was inserted to gain authority to rebuild the cafe. Five members of the House of Lords Select Committee visited the Malvern Hills and decided that there were enough facilities in the immediate area and that St Ann's Well cafe should be enough provision on the hills, so the application to rebuild was turned down.

== Panorama ==
The Beacon affords an extensive panoramic view that includes the Lickey Hills near Redditch, The Wrekin and past Birmingham to Cannock Chase, as well as much of Herefordshire and Gloucestershire, the Welsh border mountains, the Shropshire Hills and across the valleys of the Severn and Avon to the Cotswold Hills. Parts of thirteen counties, the Bristol Channel, and the cathedrals of Worcester, Gloucester and Hereford can be seen.

On the summit is a viewfinder or toposcope, identifying the hills to be seen on a clear day; it was designed by Malvern architect Arthur Troyte Griffith, a friend of Sir Edward Elgar and erected in 1897 to celebrate Queen Victoria's diamond jubilee. It was stolen in 2000 and replaced by Malvern Hills Conservators the same year. The original was returned to the Conservators in 2001.

The following principal hills can be seen from the summit in perfect viewing conditions (distances in miles):

- N-NE: North Hill (1), Mow Cop (70), Sheepwalks Hill (25), Croker Hill (77), Shutlingsloe (78), Shining Tor (81), The Roaches (75), Axe Edge Moor (80), Merryton Low (74), Ipstones Edge (68), Sedgley Beacon (32), Wren's Nest (31), Cannock Chase (44), Turners Hill (30), The Four Stones (24), Walton Hill (24), Lickey Hills (24)
- NE-E: Bardon Hill (60), Oldbury Hill (45), Honey Hill (58), Beacon Hill (46), Arbury Hill (49), Edge Hill (38), Meon Hill (25)
- E-SE: Shenlow Hill (37), Ebrington Hill (26), Brailes Hill (33), Bredon Hill (12), Alderton Hill (16), Oxenton Hill (15), Cleeve Hill (19)
- SE-S: White Horse Hill (49), Leckhampton Hill (20), Birdlip Hill (22), Churchdown Hill (18), Painswick Beacon (22), Robinswood Hill (19)
- S-SW: Hanging Hill (47), Midsummer Hill (5), Herefordshire Beacon (3), Dundry Down (51), May Hill (16), Beacon Batch (58), Ruardean Hill (19), Beacon Hill (Llandogo) (30), Wentwood (39), Twmbarlwm (46)
- SW-W: Mynydd Twyn-glas (43), Coity Mountain (41), Blorenge (37), Graig Syfyrddin (27), Ysgyryd Fawr (32), Garway Hill (24), Sugar Loaf (35), Aconbury Hill (18), Pen Cerrig Calch (37), Seager Hill (11), Pen Allt Mawr (37), Waun Fach (36), Black Mountain (33), The Begwns (38)
- W-NW: Burton Hill (23), Gwaunceste Hill (39), Hergest Ridge (33), Bradnor Hill (31), Great Rhos (38), Plynlimon (66), Hegdon Hill (13), Beacon Hill (Powys) (42), Cilfaesty Hill (47), Black Hill (Shropshire) (35), Aran Fawddwy (74), High Vinnalls (25), Burrow (34)
- NW-N: Foel Cedig (71), Corndon Hill (43), Callow Hill (31), Stiperstones (42), Long Mynd (38), Titterstone Clee Hill (23), Brown Clee Hill (28), The Wrekin (40), Berrow Hill (9), Abberley Hill (14), Ashley Heath (56)

== In cultural life ==
=== Television ===
The West of England Quarry on the Worcestershire Beacon was used as a location in the Doctor Who serial The Krotons, starring Patrick Troughton. The serial was broadcast in four weekly parts from 28 December 1968 to 18 January 1969.

== See also ==
- Malvern Hills
