= St Wulstan's Local Nature Reserve =

Nature reserve in Worcestershire, England

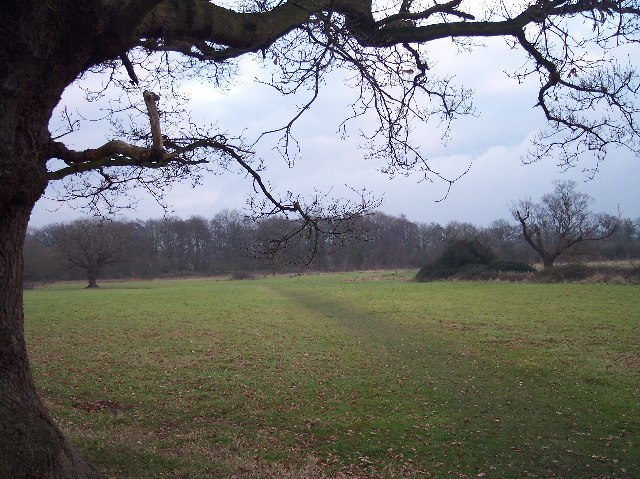

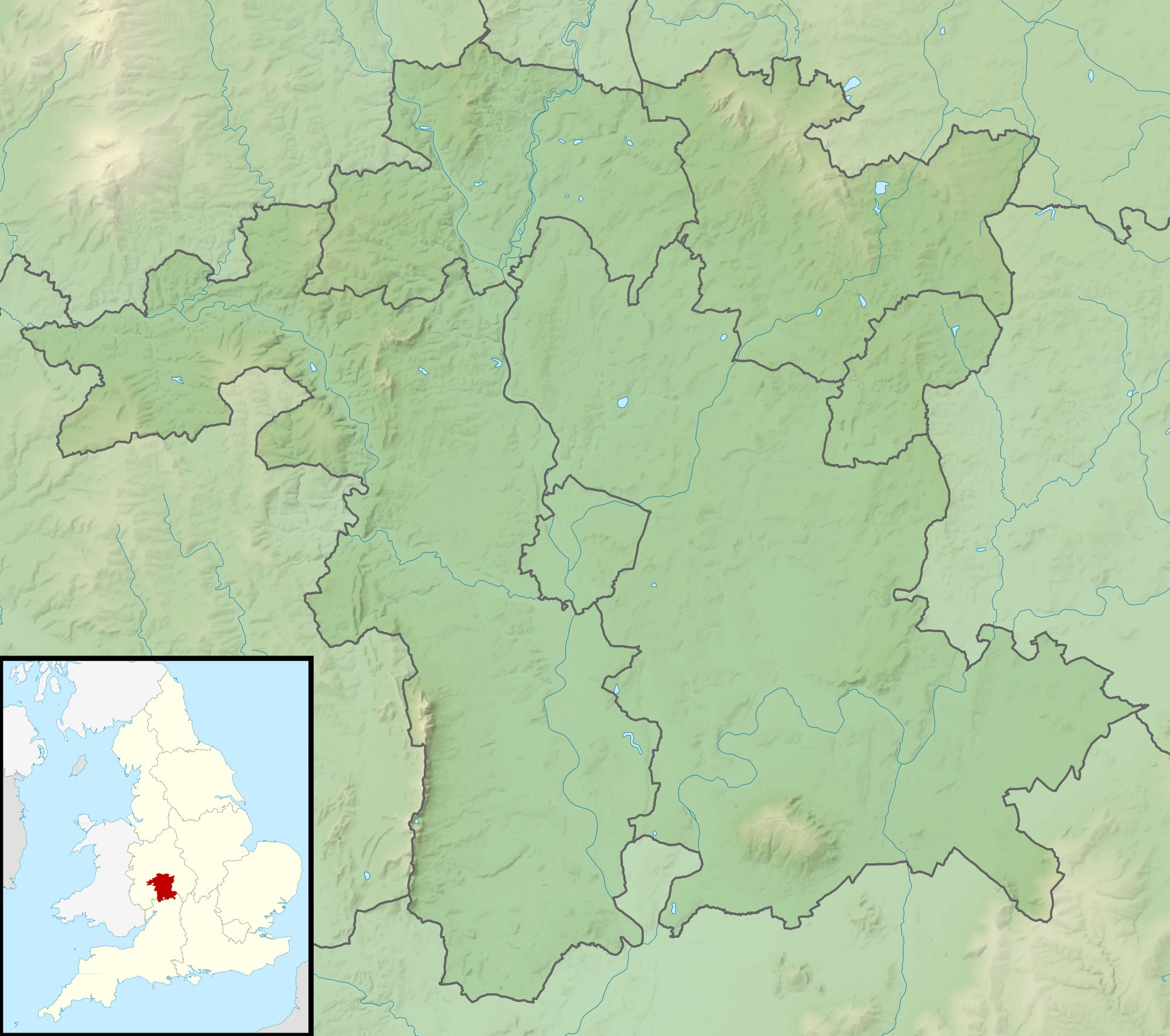
- Location within Worcestershire
- Location: Malvern, Worcestershire
- OS grid: SO 783 414
- Coordinates: 52°4′13″N 2°19′4″W
- Area: 22 hectares (54 acres)
- Designation: Local nature reserve
- Website: www.worcestershire.gov.uk/directory_record/3327/st_wulstans_nature_reserve

St Wulstan's Local Nature Reserve is a local nature reserve near Malvern, Worcestershire, England. The site was formerly the location of St Wulstan's Hospital, and was established as a nature reserve in 1997.

== Description ==
The reserve, area 22 hectares (54 acres), is situated east of the Malvern Hills. It is a mixture of ancient woodland and grassland. Ornamental trees, planted by hospital patients, are among the native species. The brimstone butterfly, one of the butterfly species to be seen, is the emblem of the reserve. There are waymarked trails, and seating is provided at regular points around the site.

== History ==
Farmland, part of Brickbarns Farm, was requisitioned in 1943 for the construction of a hospital which would receive American servicemen injured in the planned Normandy landings; other land in the Malvern area was also requisitioned for the same purpose. It was known locally as "Brickbarns Hospital".

After the American military units left, the hospital was handed over to the Ministry of Health; it was renamed St Wulstan's Hospital, and in April 1950 it was opened as a TB hospital to serve the area. The disease later was under control, and fewer such hospitals were needed; the hospital closed in May 1960. It re-opened in November 1961 as a regional psychiatric rehabilitation hospital, with 350 beds. The hospital closed in 1986.

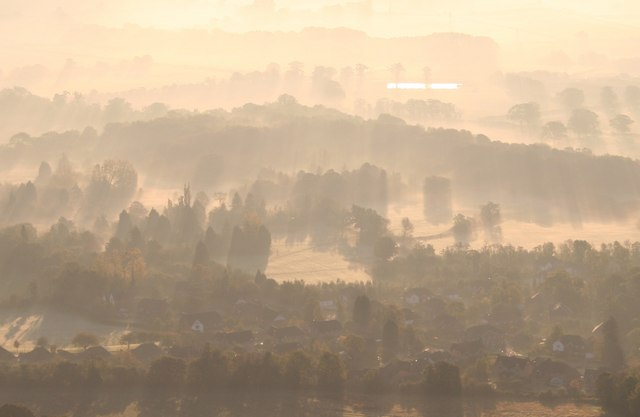
The reserve, viewed from the southern peak of Pinnacle Hill just after dawn

Houses were built on part of the site. In 1996 it was agreed by Malvern Hills District Council that the remaining land should be designated a local nature reserve. The site, consisting of formal landscape garden, hay meadows, scrubland and woodland, was landscaped and opened as St Wulstan's Local Nature Reserve on 25 April 1997.

In November 2003 the St Wulstan's Residents' Association was formed. The reserve was given the Green Flag Award in July 2008.
