= Malvern Hills Act 1995 =

- Act of Parliament
- Parliament of the United Kingdom
- Long title: An Act to amend certain enactments relating to the Malvern Hills Conservators and the management of the Malvern Hills; to confer further powers on the Malvern Hills Conservators; to make further provision in relation to the Malvern Hills; and for other purposes.
- Citation: 1995 c. iii

Dates
- Royal assent: 28 June 1995

Text of statute as originally enacted

The Malvern Hills Act 1995 (c. iii) is an act of the Parliament of the United Kingdom that governs the use of the geographical area known as the Malvern Hills located at and near the town of Malvern, Worcestershire, England. It is primarily intended to enact measures to maintain the ecology and environment of the area in the 21st century and also includes clauses concerning the building known as St Ann's Well and the provision of other refreshment facilities.

== Background ==
The Beacon cafe, a café that had existed on the summit of Worcestershire Beacon for many decades, was destroyed by fire in 1989. The conservators had plans to replace the building but were advised that they risked prosecution for rebuilding as the original cafe building was an encroachment on common land. The Malvern Hills Bill was in preparation to modernise some of the clauses in previous acts a clause was inserted to gain authority to rebuild the cafe. Five members of the House of Lords select committee visited the Malvern Hills and decided that there were enough facilities in the immediate area and that St Ann's Well cafe should be enough provision on the hills, so the application to rebuild was turned down. The cost of implementing the 1995 Act was approximately £250,000.

== Overview ==
The 1995 act gave the Malvern Hills Conservators further powers to:

- Purchase or lease buildings off their land and refurbish them for use as offices, information centres and residential accommodation for employees;
- Dispose of land by sale, exchange or letting;
- Increase the number of refreshment stalls permitted on their land from three to six;
- Set aside money from their general fund to create a fund to purchase further land;
- Grant easements;
- Impose fines under the Byelaws;
- Restrict public access to their land, in consultation with other bodies, for a reasonable period to protect ancient monuments, sites of natural beauty, trees and flora and fauna and in the interests of public safety;
- Regulate horse riding;
- Remove placards, abandoned machinery and vehicles and to dispose of them after a specified period;
- Permit temporary lavatories for special events.

== See also ==
Malvern Hills Conservators
