= Midsummer Hill =

Hill in the Malvern Hills, England

Coordinates: 52.0353°N 2.3505°W

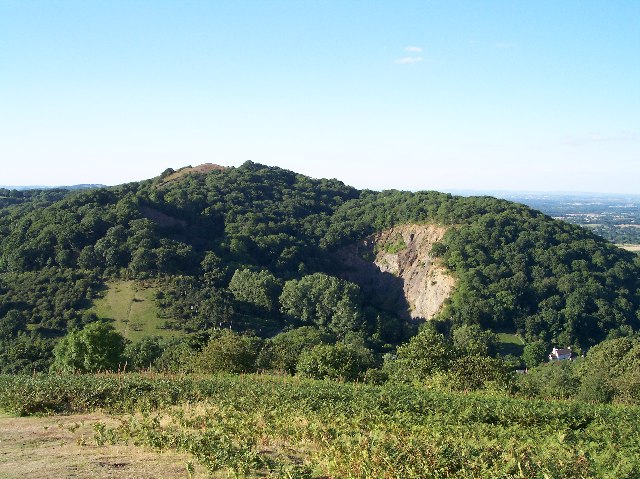
- Midsummer Hill from Ragged Stone Hill

Highest point
- Elevation: 284 m (932 ft)

Geography
- Location: Malvern Hills, England
- OS grid: SO760375
- Topo map: OS Landranger 150

Geology
- Rock age: Pre-Cambrian
- Mountain type(s): Igneous, Metamorphic

Climbing
- Easiest route: Hiking

Midsummer Hill is situated in the range of Malvern Hills that runs approximately 13 kilometres (8 mi) north-south along the Herefordshire-Worcestershire border. It lies to the south of Herefordshire Beacon with views to Eastnor Castle. It has an elevation of 284 metres (932 ft). To the north is Swinyard Hill. It is the site of an Iron Age hill fort which spans Midsummer Hill and Hollybush Hill. The hillfort is protected as a Scheduled Ancient Monument and is owned by Natural England. It can be accessed via a footpath which leads south from the car park at British Camp on the A449 or a footpath which heads north from the car park in Hollybush on the A438.

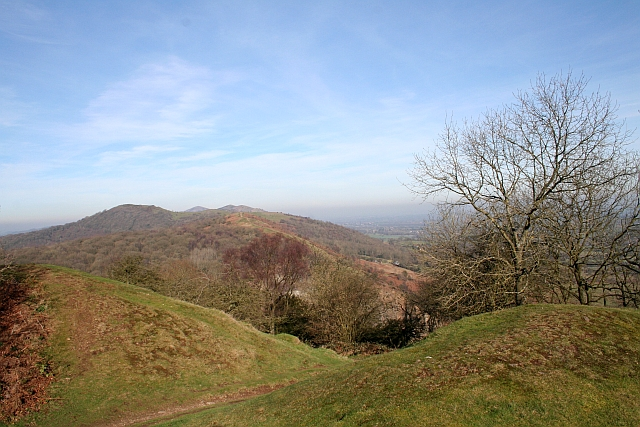
North gate, Midsummer Hill

== Midsummer Hill Camp ==
The hillfort is very unusual in that the ramparts enclose two hills and the intervening valley. Bowden speculates that the spring within the valley "enhance[s] the position of the hillfort as a site of symbolic value".

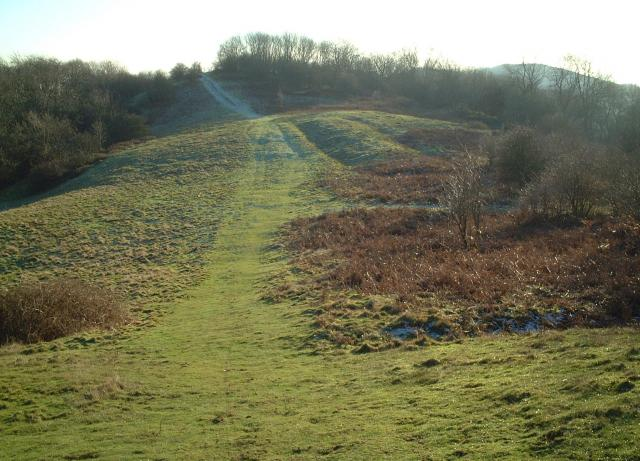
Pillow Mound, Hollybush Hill

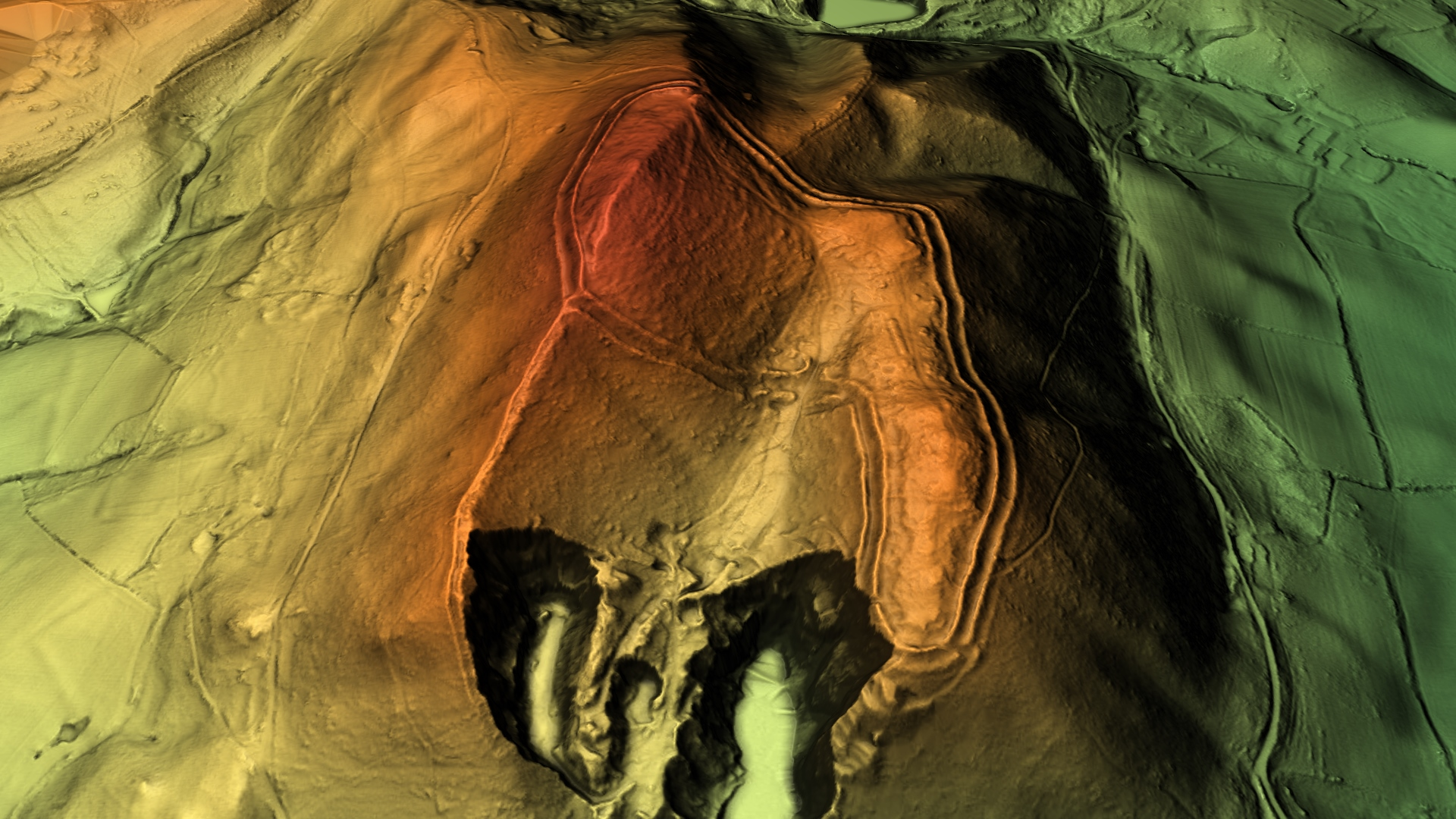
3D view of the digital terrain model

The rampart and ditch were built around 390 BC and it is thought that the settlement was occupied by 1500 people until it was destroyed by fire in AD 48.

== Midsummer Hill in cultural life ==
In The Ley Hunter's Companion Paul Devereux theorised that a 10-mile alignment he called the "Malvern Ley" passed through St Ann's Well, the Wyche Cutting, a section of the Shire Ditch, Midsummer Hill, Whiteleaved Oak, Redmarley D'Abitot and Pauntley.
