= Hollybush Hill =

Coordinates: 52.0353°N 2.3505°W

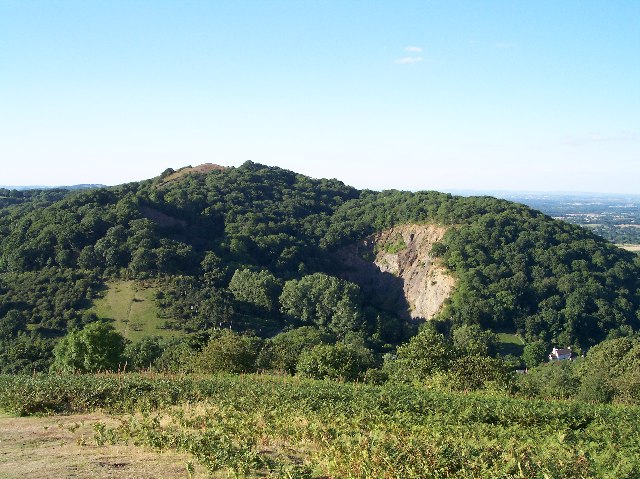
- Midsummer Hill and Hollybush Quarry from Ragged Stone Hill

Highest point
- Elevation: 242 m (794 ft)

Geography
- Location: Malvern Hills, England
- OS grid: SO760375
- Topo map: OS Landranger 150

Geology
- Rock age: Pre-Cambrian
- Mountain type(s): Igneous, Metamorphic

Climbing
- Easiest route: Hiking

Hollybush Hill is situated in the range of Malvern Hills that runs approximately 13 kilometres (8 mi) north–south along the Herefordshire–Worcestershire border. It lies to the east of Midsummer Hill. It has an elevation of 242 metres (794 ft).

== History ==
It is the site of an Iron Age hill fort which spans Hollybush Hill and Midsummer Hill. The hillfort is protected as a Scheduled Ancient Monument and is owned by Natural England. It can be accessed via a footpath which leads south from the car park at British Camp on the A449 or a footpath which heads north from the car park in Hollybush on the A438.
