= Tinkers Hill =

Mountain in United Kingdom

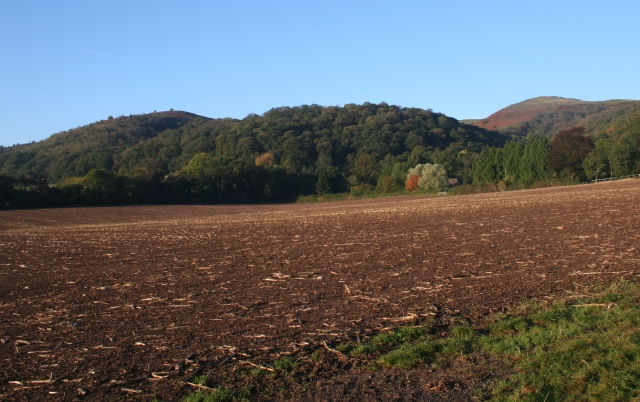
- Tinkers Hill

Highest point
- Elevation: 213 m (699 ft)
- Coordinates: 52.057274°N 2.341485°W

Geography
- Location: Malvern Hills, England
- Topo map: OS Landranger 150

Geology
- Rock age: Pre-Cambrian
- Mountain type(s): Igneous, Metamorphic

Climbing
- Easiest route: Hiking

Tinkers Hill is situated in the range of Malvern Hills that runs about 13 kilometres (8 mi) north-south along the Herefordshire-Worcestershire border. It lies to the east of Herefordshire Beacon with views across the Vale of Evesham and the Cotswolds. It has an elevation of 213 metres (699 ft).

In June 2004, the Worcestershire Bat Group identified Tinkers Hill Wood as being home to a colony of barbastelles, a species of bat protected under the European Habitats Directive.
