= Jubilee Hill =

Hill in the Malvern Hills, England

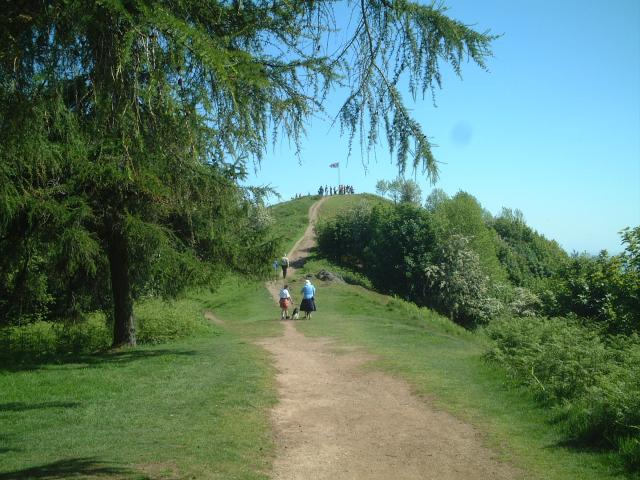
- Thirdsland and Jubilee Hill

Highest point
- Elevation: 327 m (1,073 ft)
- Parent peak: End Hill
- Coordinates: 52.0804°N 2.3387°W

Geography
- Location: Malvern Hills, England
- Topo map: OS Landranger 150

Geology
- Rock age: Pre-Cambrian
- Mountain type(s): Igneous, Metamorphic

Climbing
- Easiest route: Hiking

Jubilee Hill is situated in the range of Malvern Hills that runs about 13 kilometres (8 mi) north-south along the Herefordshire-Worcestershire border. It lies between Perseverance Hill and Pinnacle Hill and has an elevation of 327 metres (1,073 ft).

Jubilee Hill was named by the Malvern Hills Conservators in 2002 in honour of the Golden Jubilee of Elizabeth II. Prince Andrew, Duke of York unveiled a plaque at the top of the hill, commemorating its new identity, in 2003.

The plaque was taken away by someone sometime in March/April 2018, but was replaced with a new plaque in June 2022.

The site was also previously known, and is still today by a group of locals, as 'Dad's Hill', after a well-loved local bicycle shop-owner called Mr Earp who climbed Jubilee Hill frequently. Commemorated there upon his death a local group still climb the hill on the same day every year in his name.

Jubilee Drive, the road which runs along the western (Herefordshire) side of the hills, was built and named for the Golden Jubilee of Queen Victoria, in 1887.
