= Raggedstone Hill =

Hill in the Malvern Hills, England

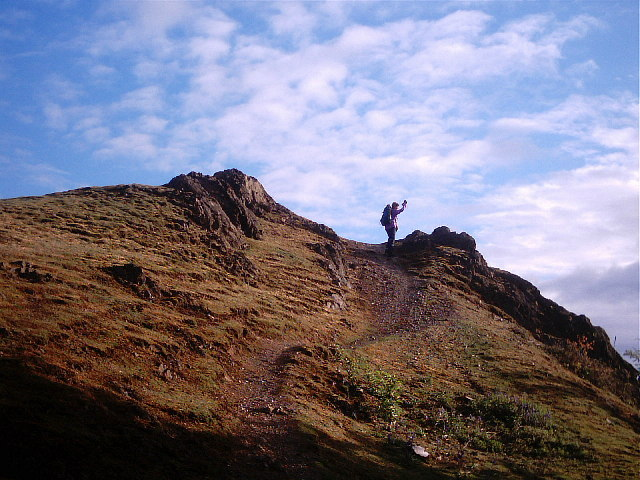
- Raggedstone Hill

Highest point
- Elevation: 254 m (833 ft)
- Coordinates: 52.0253°N 2.3520°W

Geography
- Location: Malvern Hills, England
- OS grid: SO759364
- Topo map: OS Landranger 190

Geology
- Rock age: Pre-Cambrian
- Mountain type(s): Igneous, Metamorphic

Climbing
- Easiest route: Hiking

Raggedstone Hill is situated on the range of Malvern Hills that runs approximately 13 kilometres (8 mi) north-south along the Herefordshire-Worcestershire border. Raggedstone Hill lies close to the borders of Herefordshire, Worcestershire and Gloucestershire. It has an elevation of 254 metres (833 ft).

The northern flank of the hill lies on the southern side of the Hollybush pass, from where its summit is a brisk 15–20 minutes steep walk from the nearby Hollybush car park.

According to legend, the hill's shadow casts misfortune upon whomever it falls.

== Raggedstone Hill in cultural life ==
=== Literature ===
The Shadow of the Ragged Stone Hill is a 19th-century novel by Charles F. Grindrod concerning a monk of Little Malvern Priory. He has been made a monk against his will, and his main object in life is to avenge his father's murder of his mother, a deed incited by false accusations made against his mother by a "wicked knight". The monk disguises himself in borrowed armour, attends a tournament and there kills the knight. Later, he breaks his vow of chastity by marrying a woman who he has rescued from the advances of a "lascivious knight", and is then falsely accused of killing her father in a duel. He is condemned to crawl to the summit of Ragged Stone Hill once a day as punishment. When the monk can no longer bear the punishment he curses the hill and anyone on whom the shadow of the hill should fall.

The Ragged Stone is a poem by Wilfrid Wilson Gibson, a founder of the Dymock Poets.

=== Music ===
'Raggedstone Hill' is the name of a song by the band Dodgy, written and recorded in the Malverns during 2011.
