= British Camp =

Iron Age hill fort in the Malvern Hills of England

Coordinates: 52.05798°N 2.35176°W

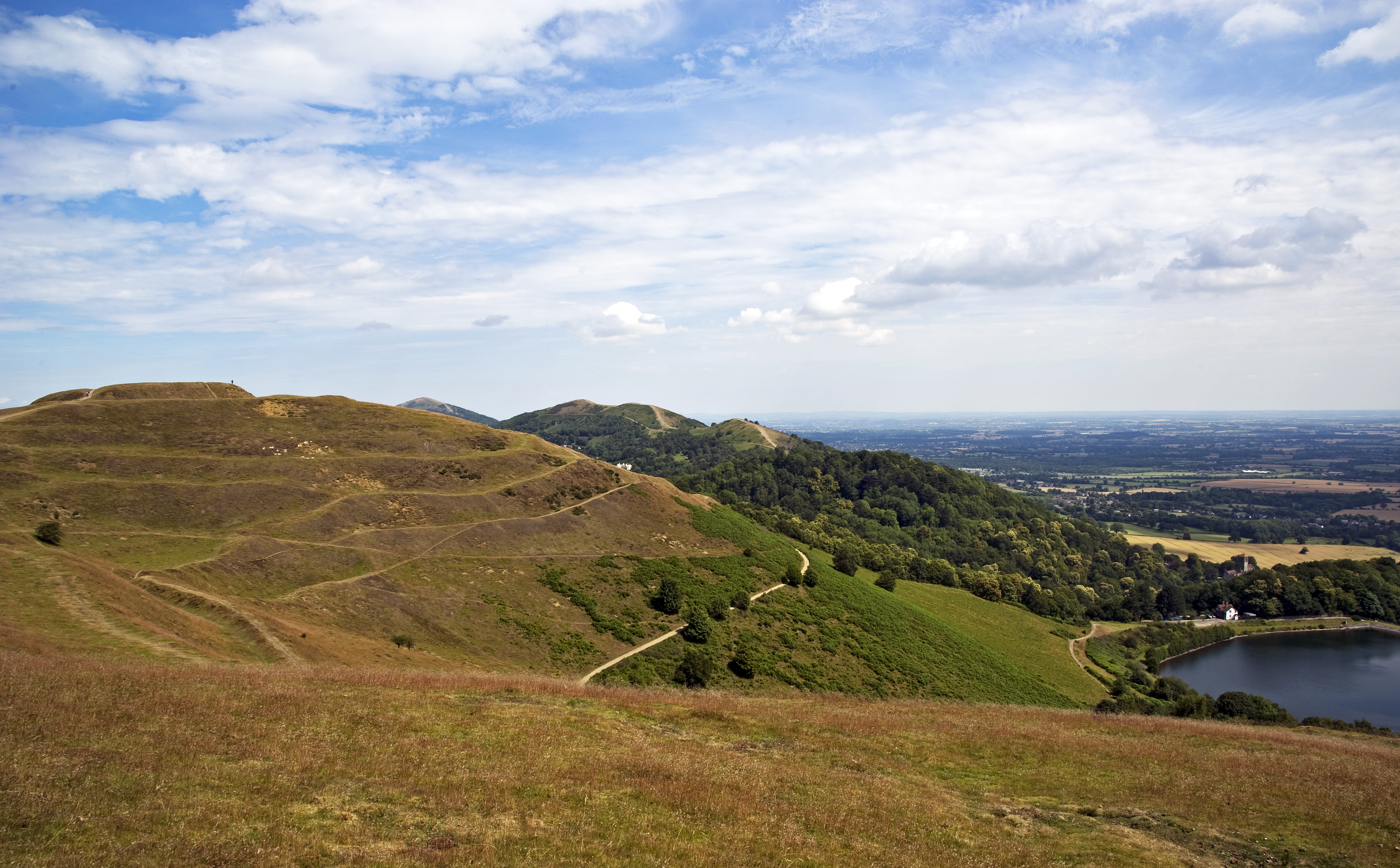
British Camp (left)

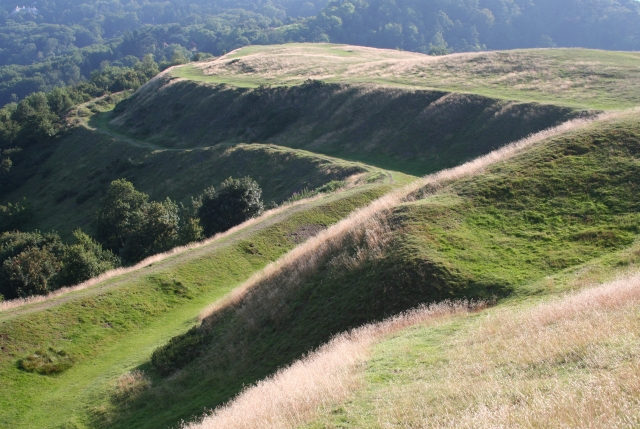
The northern extension of British Camp

British Camp is an Iron Age hill fort located at the top of Herefordshire Beacon in the Malvern Hills. The hill fort is protected as a Scheduled Ancient Monument and is owned and maintained by Malvern Hills Conservators. The fort is thought to have been first constructed in the 2nd century BC. A Norman castle was built on the site.

The extensive earthworks remain clearly visible today and determine the shape of the hill.

The height of the summit of British Camp is 1,109 feet (338 m).

== Situation ==
British Camp is composed of extensive earthworks that have been compared to a giant wedding cake. Midsummer Hill fort is a mile south of British Camp. There are a number of generally round hut platforms on British Camp, which may well suggest a permanent occupation. However it is unusual to have two major hill forts within such a short distance.

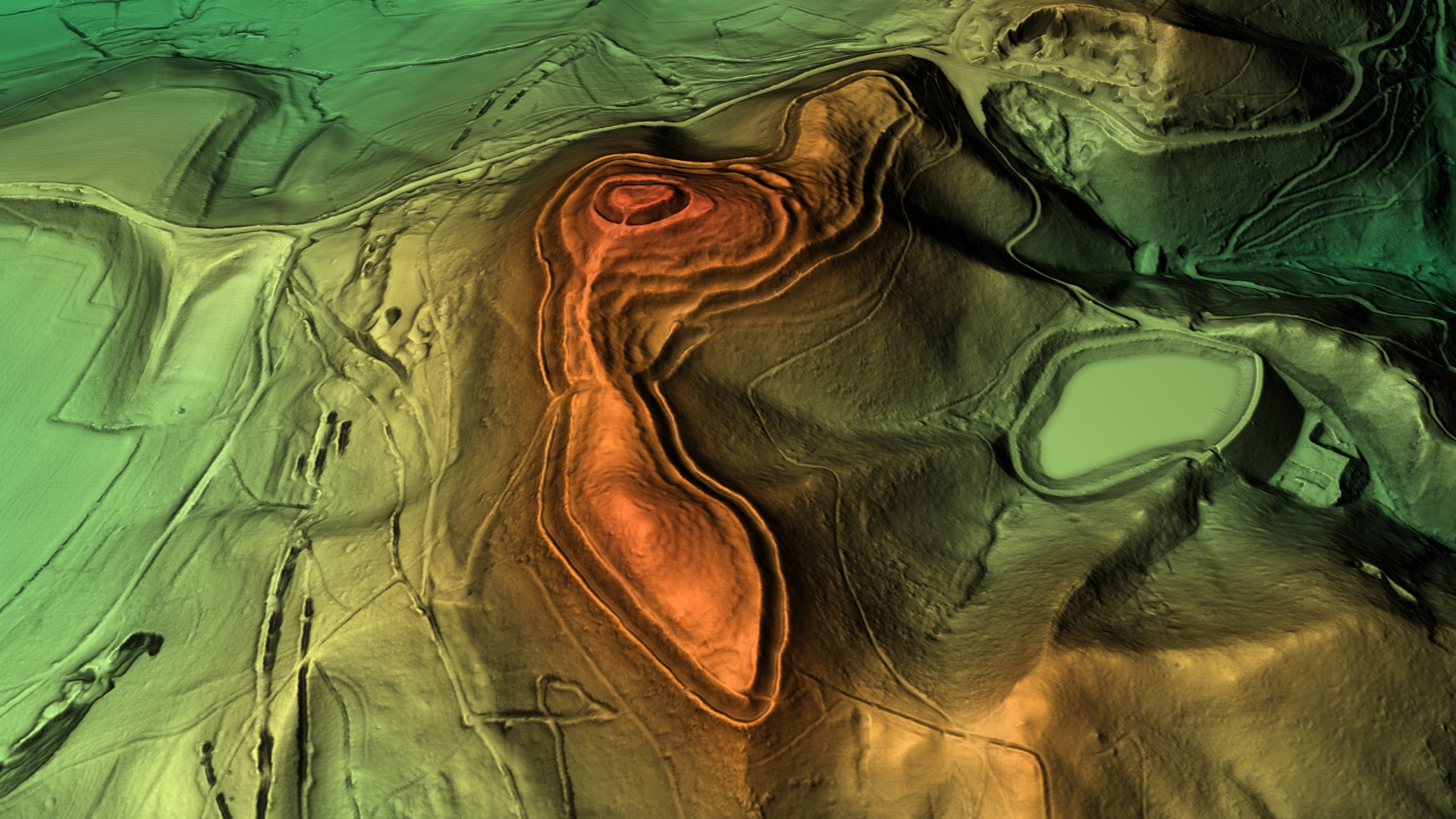
3D view of the digital terrain model

The diarist John Evelyn (1620–1706) remarked that the view from the hill was "one of the godliest vistas in England".

== British Camp ==
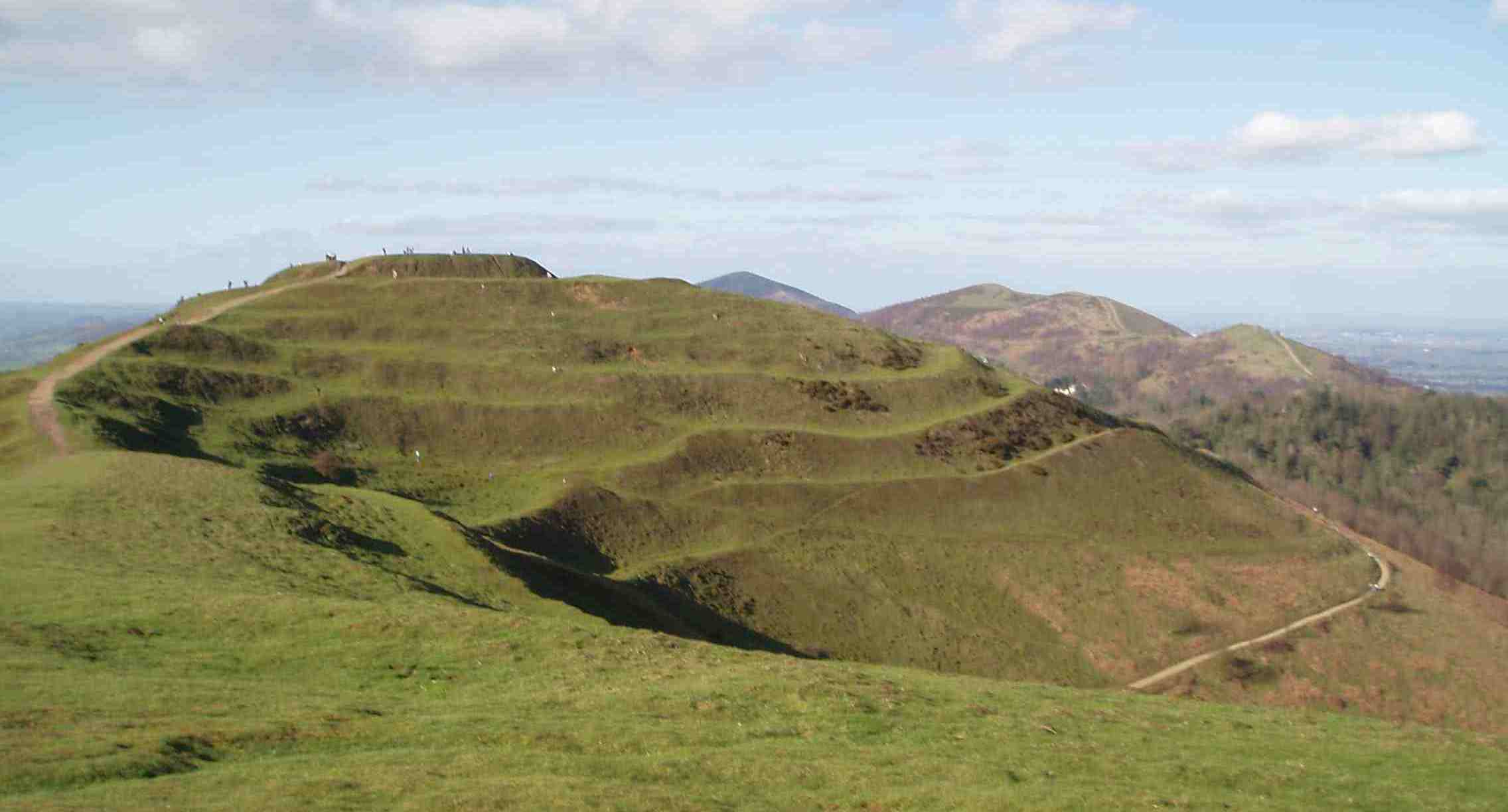
The central earthworks

The ditch and counterscarp bank around the entire site covers three hills, although those to north and south are little more than spurs. With a perimeter of 6,800 feet (2,100 m), the defences enclose an area of around 44 acres (18 ha). The first earthworks were around the base of the central hill otherwise known as the citadel. At least four pre-historic phases of building have so far been identified. Original gates appear to have existed to east, west and north-east.

== The Roman Era ==
There is no evidence about whether the coming of the Romans ended the prehistoric use of British Camp, but folklore states that the ancient British chieftain Caratacus made his last stand here. This is unlikely, according to the description of the Roman historian Tacitus who implies a site closer to the river Severn. Excavation at Midsummer Hill fort, Bredon Hill and Croft Ambrey all show evidence of violent destruction around 48 AD. This may suggest that British Camp was abandoned or destroyed around the same time.

== The Castle ==
Medieval castles were sometimes built within earlier sites, reusing the earthworks of Iron Age hill forts for instance as was the case at British Camp. A ringwork and bailey castle, known as Colwall Castle as well as The Herefordshire Beacon, was built within the Iron Age hill fort, probably in the ten years immediately before 1066. Quite possibly the builder was Earl Harold Godwinson, the future King Harold II of England. Earl Harold is recorded as building another fortress in the county at Longtown Castle. The castle would appear to have been refortified during The Anarchy of the reign of King Stephen. Before 1148 the fortress was held by Waleran de Beaumont, 1st Earl of Worcester. The castle appears to have changed hands again in 1151 and 1153 when attacked by royalists. At this time it was defended by the men of Earl Waleran's brother, Robert de Beaumont, 2nd Earl of Leicester. The castle was finally destroyed by King Henry II in 1155 and mentioned in passing by William Langland before 1386.

== The Shire Ditch ==
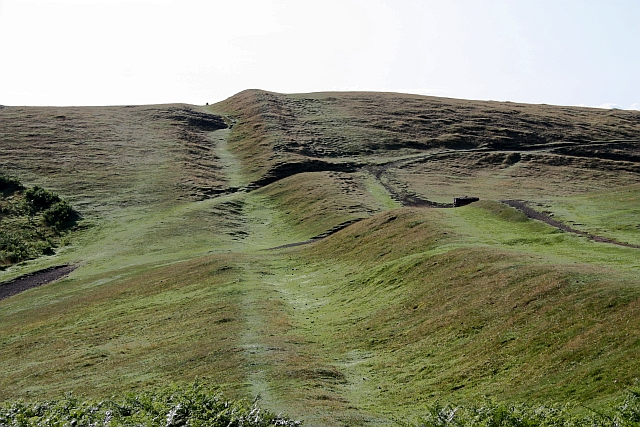
Along the Shire Ditch to Broad Down

The Shire Ditch, or Red Earl's Dyke, runs north and south of British Camp along the ridge of the hills. It was created in 1287 by Gilbert de Clare, the Earl of Gloucester, following a boundary dispute with Thomas de Cantilupe, the Bishop of Hereford. Recent research has shown that the Shire Ditch might actually be much older. Indeed, there is some evidence that it may have started life as a prehistoric trackway running from Midsummer Hill fort to the Worcestershire Beacon, the highest hill in the range over three miles to the north of the Camp.

== Folklore ==
A popular legend tells that Caratacus, a British tribal chieftain, fought his last battle against the Romans at British Camp and goes on to say that after his capture he was taken to Rome where he was given a villa and a pension by Emperor Claudius.

However, the description by Tacitus, the Roman historian makes this unlikely:

Caratacus resorted to the ultimate hazard, adopting a place for battle so that entry, exit, everything would be unfavourable to us and for the better to his own men, with steep mountains all around, and, wherever a gentle access was possible, he strewed rocks in front in the manner of a rampart. And in front too there flowed a stream with an unsure ford, and companies of armed men had taken up position along the defences.

Although the River Severn is visible from British Camp, it is about 8 kilometres (5 miles) from it, so this battle must have taken place elsewhere. A number of locations have been suggested, including sites near Brampton Bryan, an important Roman site, or Church Stretton which also has an Iron Age fort on Caer Caradoc Hill.
