= Swinyard Hill =

Hill in the Malvern Hills, England

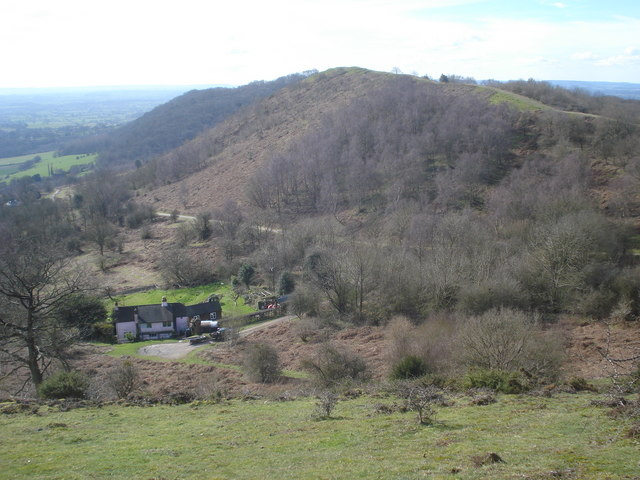
- Swinyard Hill

Highest point
- Elevation: 272 m (892 ft)OS 1:10,000 map series, Sheet 1, North Malvern to Wyche.
- Coordinates: 52°02′54″N 2°20′43″W

Geography
- Location: Malvern Hills, England
- Topo map: OS Landranger 150

Geology
- Rock age: Pre-Cambrian
- Mountain type(s): Igneous, Metamorphic

Climbing
- Easiest route: Hiking

Swinyard Hill is a hill in the Malvern Range, a line of hills that runs approximately 13 kilometres (8 mi) north-south along the Herefordshire-Worcestershire border. Swinyard Hill lies north of Midsummer Hill and south of Hangmans Hill. It has an elevation of 272 metres (892 ft).

Swinyard Hill has an outcrop of quartzite.
