= Pinnacle Hill =

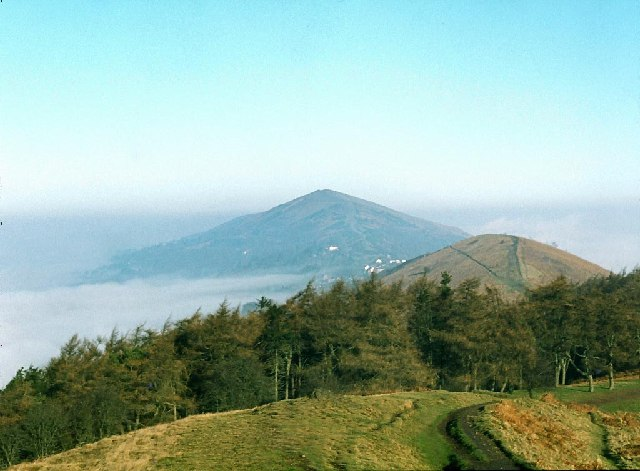
- View from Pinnacle Hill

Highest point
- Elevation: 358 m (1,175 ft)
- Coordinates: 52.0766°N 2.3400°W

Geography
- Location: Malvern Hills, England
- Topo map: OS Landranger 150

Geology
- Rock age: Pre-Cambrian
- Mountain type(s): Igneous, Metamorphic

Climbing
- Easiest route: Hiking

Pinnacle Hill is situated in the range of Malvern Hills in England, running about 13 kilometres (8 mi) north-south along the Herefordshire-Worcestershire border. It lies between Jubilee Hill and Black Hill and has an elevation of 357 metres (1,171 ft). It is the site of two possible Bronze Age round barrows.

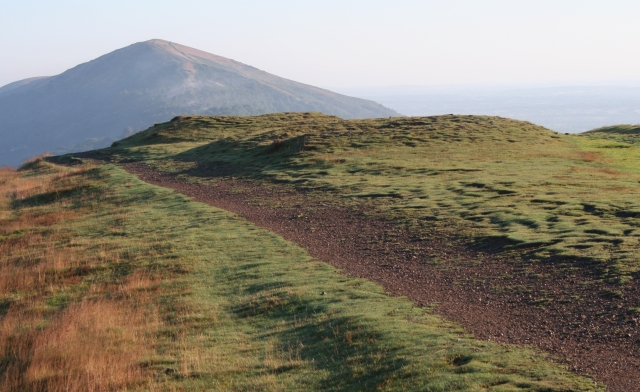
Tumuli on Pinnacle Hill
