= Mynydd Twyn-glas =

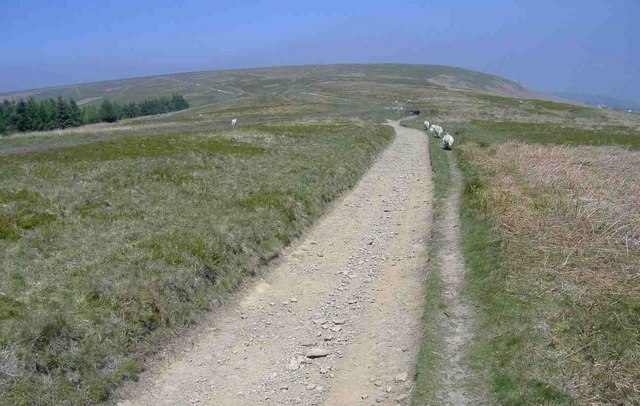
- Track leading up to Mynydd Twyn-glas from the south

Highest point
- Elevation: 472 m (1,549 ft)
- Prominence: 253 m (830 ft)
- Listing: Marilyn
- Coordinates: 51.6742°N 3.0716°W

Naming
- English translation: hill of the blue knoll
- Language of name: Welsh

Geography
- Location: Caerphilly, Torfaen, Wales
- OS grid: ST 259978
- Topo map: OS Landranger 171 / Explorer 152

Mynydd Twyn-glas is a sprawling 472-metre-high mountain extending into Caerphilly and Torfaen county boroughs in South Wales. It lies southwest of Pontypool, west of Cwmbran and east of Newbridge, and forms a rolling plateau, the margins of which are defined by steep slopes, many cloaked with conifer plantations. A broad shoulder extending south from the summit is known as Mynydd Maen, whilst to the north is Mynydd Llwyd. The thickly afforested northern slopes of the hill drop down steeply into Cwm y Glyn.

== Geology ==
The hill lies on the southeastern edge of the South Wales Coalfield. The summit plateau and upper slopes of the hill are formed from sandstones of the Pennant Sandstone Formation assigned to the Warwickshire Group of the late Carboniferous Period. Amongst coal seams outcropping along its eastern flanks are the Cefn Glas and Brithdir seams. The NE-SW aligned Glyn Fault cuts through the northwestern corner of the hill. A major landslip affects its southeastern slopes at Mynydd Henllys.

== Access ==
The larger part of the open land of the hill is mapped as open access under the Countryside and Rights of Way Act 2000 and thereby open to access on foot by the public. In addition a number of public footpaths cross the hill and provide access from neighbouring towns and villages.
