= Wyche, Worcestershire =

Village in Worcestershire, England

Coordinates: 52.0942°N 2.3350°W

Wyche
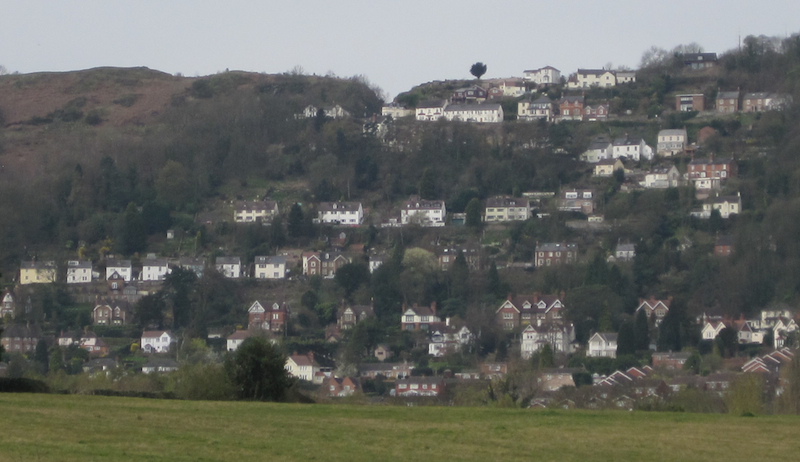
- The Wyche, seen from Poolbrook common.

- Location within Worcestershire
- OS grid reference: SO7944
  - London: 104 miles (167 km)
- Civil parish: Malvern Wells
- District: Malvern Hills
- Shire county: Worcestershire
- Region: West Midlands
- Country: England
- Sovereign state: United Kingdom
- Post town: MALVERN
- Postcode district: WR14
- Dialling code: 01684
- Police: West Mercia
- Fire: Hereford and Worcester
- Ambulance: West Midlands
- UK Parliament: West Worcestershire

Wyche (/wɪtʃ/ WITCH), often referred to locally as The Wyche, is a village and a suburb of the town of Malvern, Worcestershire, England, and part of the civil parish of Malvern Wells. It is situated approximately 1 mile (1.6 km) south of Great Malvern, the town's centre, on the B4218 road that runs from Malvern to Colwall.

The western boundary of the village is marked by The Wyche Cutting, a pass through the Malvern Hills that was once part of an Iron Age salt route, hence the name "Wyche" — several places in England associated with salt have this (or similar) in their name.

As the crest of the Malvern Hills (running north to south) defines this part of the border between the two counties of Herefordshire and Worcestershire, The Wyche Cutting itself forms a narrow pass through the hills between the counties. From the 1920s until the 1960s, this road (passing through The Wyche Cutting and Colwall) was the A4105, before being re-classified as the B4218.

The Wyche village comprises the two informal areas of Upper Wyche and Lower Wyche, mainly comprising residential properties. The Wyche Inn is a public house situated in Upper Wyche and is the county's highest pub, with views to the east overlooking the Severn valley. Old Wyche Road is one of the country's steepest streets, with an incline as great as 17.54° at Upper Wyche.

Just on the Herefordshire side of the Cutting (in Upper Colwall) is the location of the Wyche Innovation Centre, that was the former Skot Transformers building. This is also the home of the Malvern Hills Geocentre, a visitor centre based entirely on iPads with an attached cafe. Also in Upper Colwall is the Wyche Free Church.

The nearest railway stations are Great Malvern (for the lower end) and Colwall (for the upper end); both are on the same line.

The Wyche CE Primary School is located in Lower Wyche.
