= Malvern Hills =

Range of hills in central England

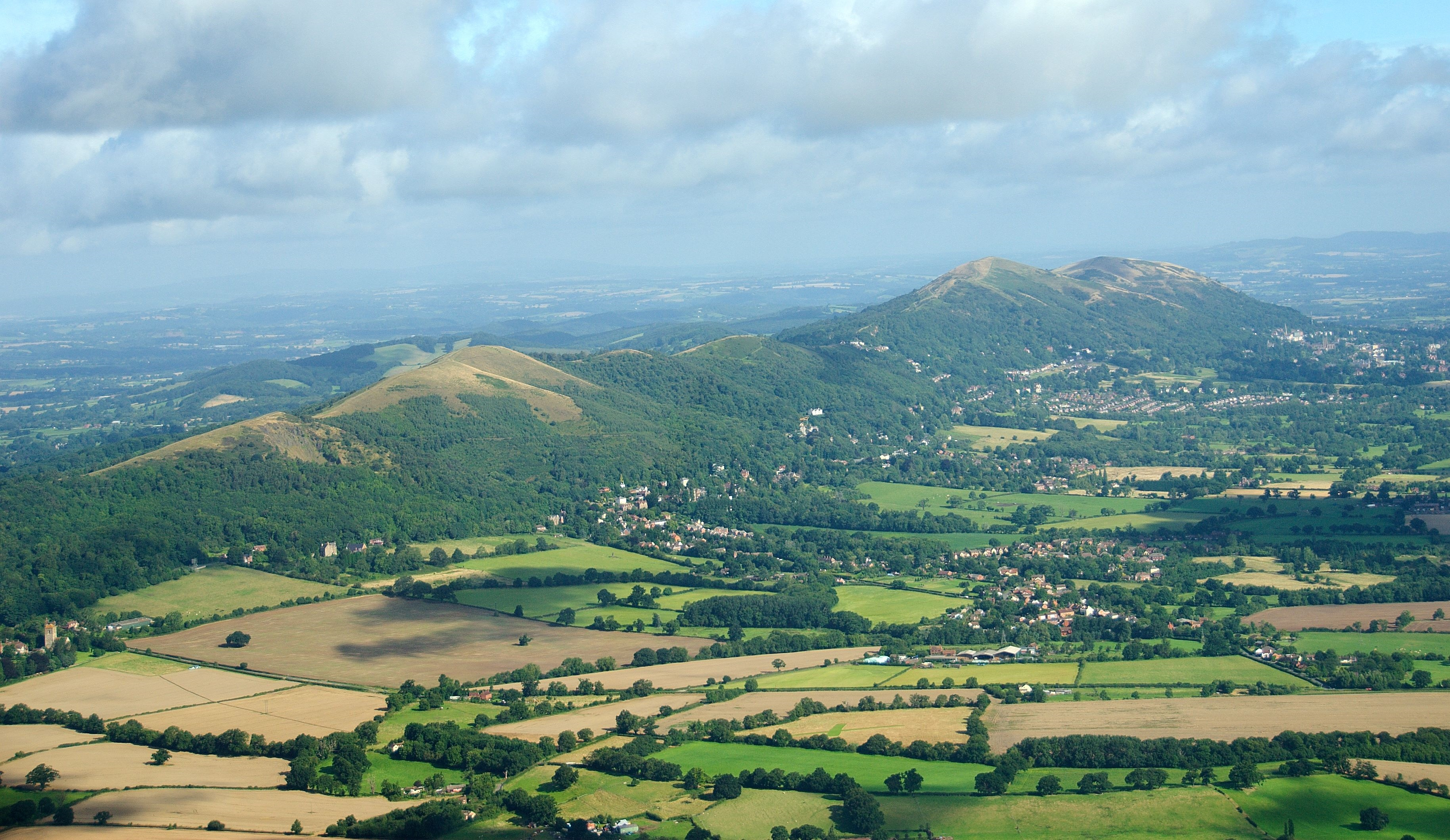
- Malvern Hills, looking northwest. Upper Welland is visible in the foreground.

- Location: England
- Coordinates: 52°05′N 2°20′W
- Length: 13 km (8.1 mi)
- Area: 12 km^{2} (4.6 sq mi)
- Elevation: 425 metres (1,394 ft)
- Established: 1959
- Governing body: Malvern Hills Conservators; Malvern Hills AONB Partnership
- Website: www.malvernhills.org.uk, www.malvernhillsaonb.org.uk

The Malvern Hills
- Site of Special Scientific Interest
- Location of The Malvern Hills.
- Area of search: Herefordshire, Worcestershire, Gloucestershire
- Grid reference: SO766472 to SO758350
- Interest: Biological/Geological
- Area: 732.3 ha (1,810 acres)
- Notification date: 1954

The Malvern Hills are in the English counties of Worcestershire, Herefordshire and a small area of northern Gloucestershire, dominating the surrounding countryside and the towns and villages of the district of Malvern. The highest summit, known as the Worcestershire Beacon, affords a panorama of the Severn Valley, the hills of Herefordshire and the Welsh mountains, parts of thirteen counties, the Bristol Channel, and the cathedrals of Worcester, Gloucester and Hereford.

They are known for their spring water – initially from holy wells, and later the spa town of Great Malvern, which led to the production of the modern bottled drinking water.

The Malvern Hills have been designated as a biological and geological Site of Special Scientific Interest, and by Natural England as National Character Area 103 and an Area of Outstanding Natural Beauty.

Management of the area is the responsibility of the Malvern Hills Trust.

== Toponymy ==
The name Malvern is first attested in a charter of around 1030, as Mælfern, and then in the Domesday Book of 1086 as Malferna. The name derives from the Common Brittonic words that survive in modern Welsh as moel ("bare") and bryn ("hill"); thus it once meant "bare hill". The name perhaps applied originally to the hill now called Worcester Beacon, after which Great Malvern was then named; Great Malvern in turn then gave its name to the whole range of hills beside which it lies. The name Malvern Hills is first attested in the fourteenth-century poem Piers Plowman.

== Geography ==
The Malvern Hills are part of an Area of Outstanding Natural Beauty, with scenic views over both Herefordshire and Worcestershire. The Hills run north–south for about 8 mi (13 kilometres), in between Great Malvern and the village of Colwall, and overlook the River Severn valley to the east, with the Cotswolds beyond. The highest point of the hills is the Worcestershire Beacon at 425 metres (1,394 ft) above sea level (OS Grid reference SO768452). The hills are famous for their natural mineral springs and wells, which were responsible for the development of Great Malvern as a spa in the early 19th century. Malvern water was bottled commercially on a large scale and sold worldwide.

There are three passes over the hills, the Wyche cutting, the A438 road north of Raggedstone Hill and the A449 road just north of the Herefordshire Beacon, the site of the British Camp, an Iron Age hillfort at the top of the hill, subsequently extended by a medieval castle. The extensive earthworks remain clearly visible today and determine the shape of the hill.

== Geology ==
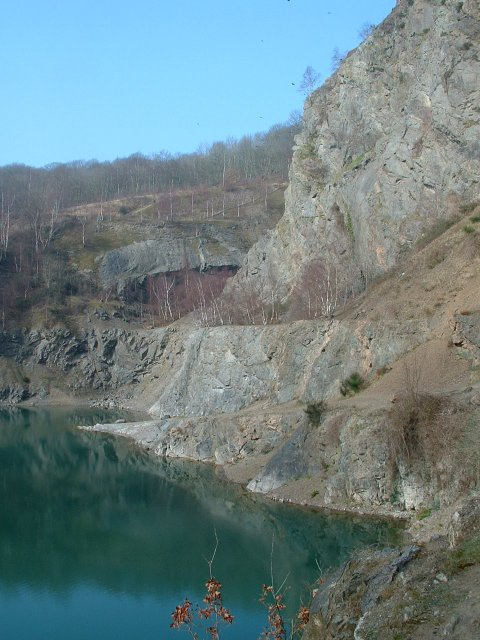
Gullet Quarry and unconformity

The Malvern Hills are formed of some of the most ancient rocks in England, mostly igneous and metamorphic rocks from the late Precambrian, known as the Uriconian, which are around 680 million years old. The Malvern Line or Malvern Lineament is the name applied to a north–south aligned lineament which runs through the Malvern Hills and extends southwards towards Bristol and northwards past Kidderminster. It consists of a series of faults and folds which have the effect of bringing old Malvernian rocks to the surface. Being largely hard igneous rocks, they have resisted erosion better than those of the surrounding countryside and result in a striking line of hills of which the Malvern Hills are the most impressive. This line is considered to mark the edge of two terranes – two once separate fragments of the Earth's crust now joined as one – the Wrekin terrane to the west and the Charnwood terrane to the east.

The main face of Gullet Quarry shows a cross-section through the Precambrian rock and exhibits many rock types including diorite, granite, gneiss, schist, pegmatite and dolerite. The evidence of the complex history of earth movements which formed the Hills can be seen by multiple joints, fractures, faults and shears, which make identifying changes in rock types difficult. Mineral deposits such as haematite, calcite and epidote can be seen within these features.

There is a tiny, man-made cave near the ridge of the hills called Clutter's Cave (or Giant's Cave or Hermit's Cave or Waum's Cave, after Walm's Well which is located on the boundary of News Wood below). The cave has been excavated into pillow lavas. Some of the rounded 'pillow' shapes are still visible around the entrance to the cave.

=== Malvern water ===
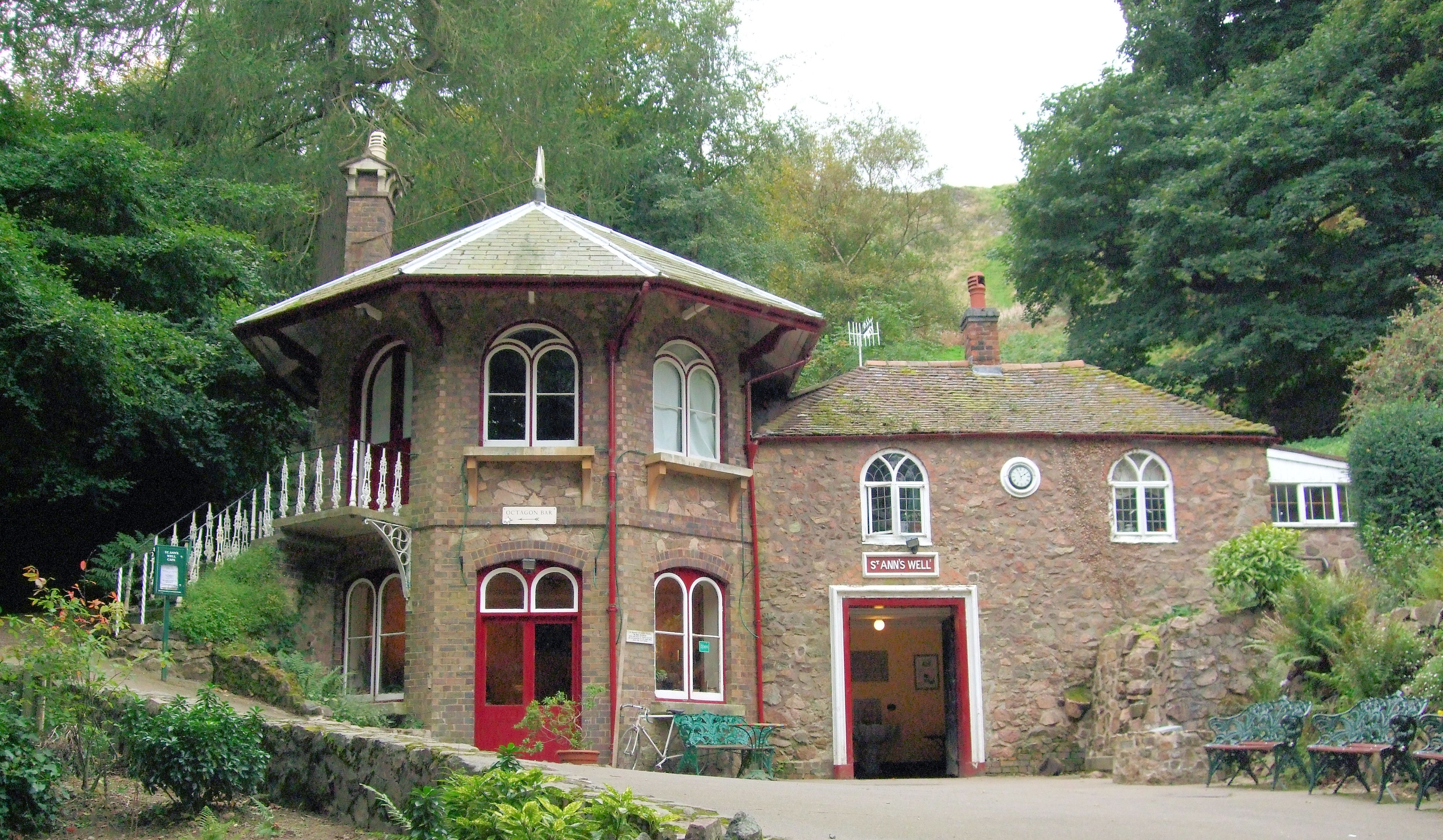
St. Ann's Well, Great Malvern, a popular café for walkers on the hills. The building on the right houses the spout from which the water surges into a basin.

The quality of Malvern water is attributable to its source. The rocks of the Malvern Hills are amongst the oldest and hardest found in England; the geology is responsible for the quality of Malvern's spring water. The hills consist of Precambrian igneous and metamorphic rock, the oldest of which are about 670 million years old. The rocks are characterised by low porosity and high secondary permeability via fissures. Malvern water is rainwater and snow meltwater that percolates through fissures created by the pressures of tectonic movements about 300 million years ago when advancing sedimentary layers of Silurian shale and limestone were pushed into and under older Precambrian rock. When the fissures are saturated, a water table forms and the water emerges as springs around the fault lines between the strata. Depending on rainfall, the flow can vary from as little as 36 litres (7.9 imp gal; 9.5 US gal) per minute to over 350 litres (77 imp gal; 92 US gal) per minute. The water permeates through the rock which, because of its hardness, leaves little or no mineral traces in the water, while at the same time the very fine cracks act as a filter for other impurities. Rainfall on the Malvern Hills is thought to be sufficient to account for all the water that runs out of the springs, reflected for example in some spring flows six to eight weeks after heavy rainfall, and in reduced flows after a dry period.

== Ecology ==
The Malvern Hills have been designated as a Site of Special Scientific Interest (SSSI) by Natural England and an Area of Outstanding Natural Beauty by the Countryside Agency (now Natural England).

Features of the Malvern Hills AONB include wide areas of acid grassland and heath on the summit and mixed broadleaved woodland and Ancient Semi-Natural Woodland on the lower hills and valleys. There are three areas of Ancient Semi-Natural Woodland in the Malvern Hills SSSI: Hollybush Roughs between the boundary of Castlemorton Common and the Midsummer Hill fort, Park Wood in West Malvern and an area near Holy Well above Malvern Wells.

Key AONB species include dormouse, barbastelle, skylark, high brown fritillary butterfly, great crested newt, adder and black poplar.

== History ==
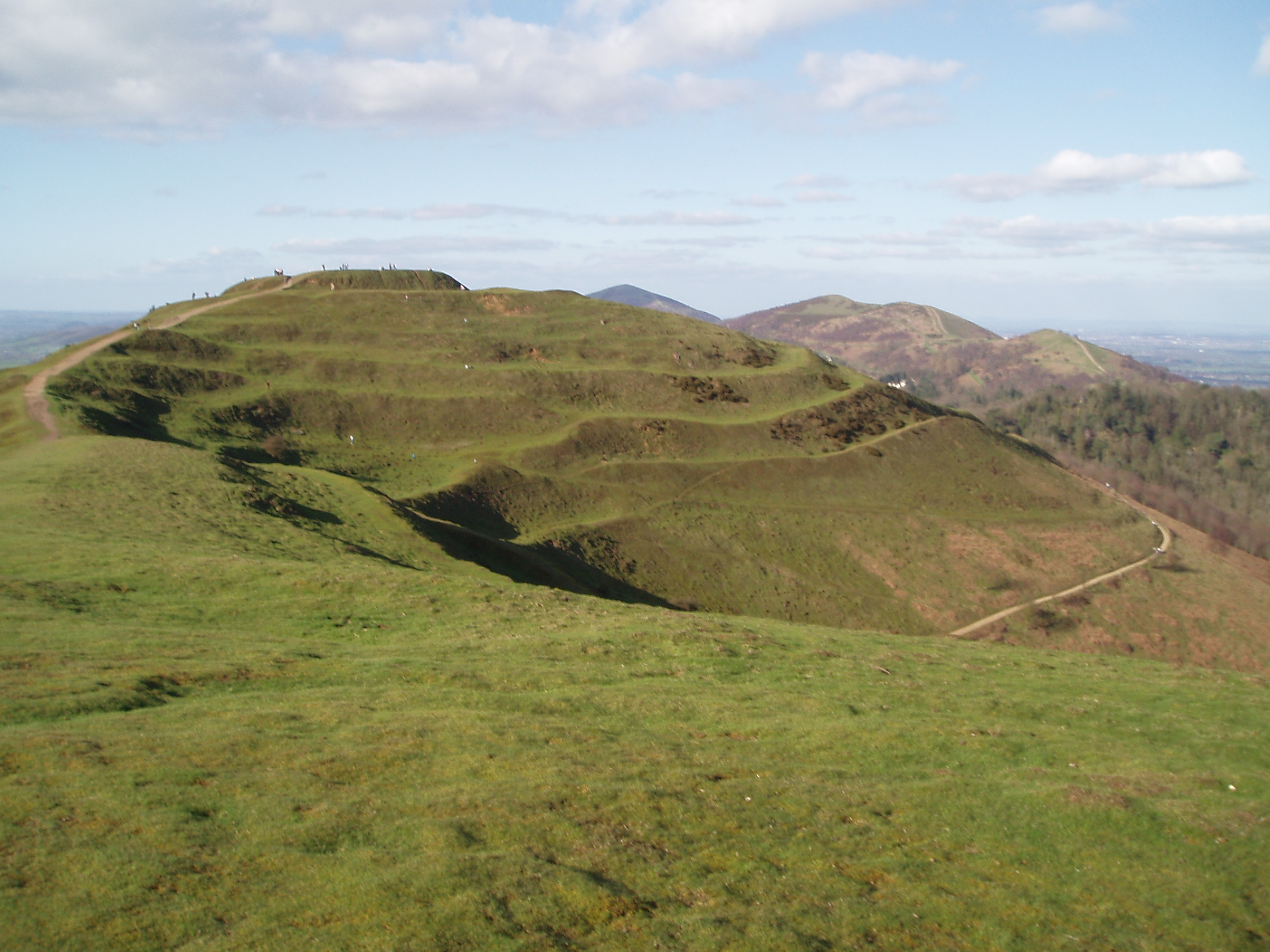
Iron Age earthworks, British camp

Flint axes, arrowheads, and flakes found in the area are attributed to early Bronze Age settlers, and the 'Shire Ditch', a late Bronze Age boundary earthwork possibly dating from around 1000 BC, was constructed along part of the crest of the hills near the site of later settlements. The Wyche Cutting, a mountain pass through the hills was in use in prehistoric times as part of the salt route from Droitwich to South Wales. A 19th-century discovery of over two hundred metal money bars suggests that the area had been inhabited by the La Tène people around 250 BC. Ancient folklore has it that the British chieftain Caractacus made his last stand against the Romans at the British Camp, a site of extensive Iron Age earthworks on a summit of the Malvern Hills close to where Malvern was to be later established. The story remains disputed, however, as Roman historian Tacitus implies a site closer to the river Severn. There is therefore no evidence that Roman presence ended the prehistoric settlement at British Camp. However, excavations at nearby Midsummer Hillfort, Bredon Hill and Croft Ambrey all show evidence of violent destruction around the year 48 AD. This may suggest that the British Camp was abandoned or destroyed around the same time.

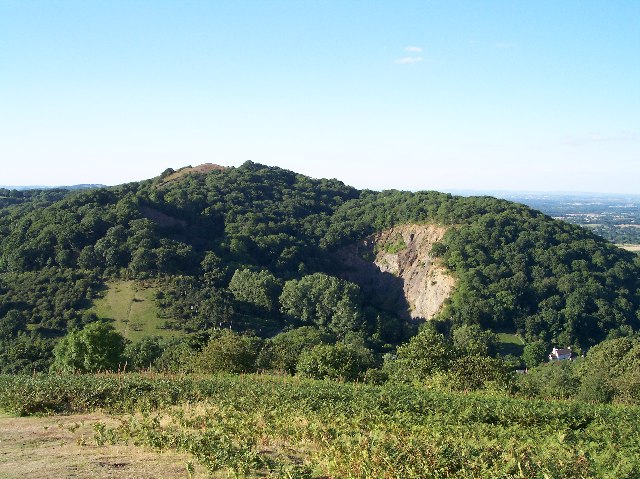
Midsummer Hill Iron Age Hill Fort and Hollybush Quarry

During the medieval period, the hills and surrounding area were part of a royal forest known as Malvern Chase. Riots by commoners and legal challenges from land owners ensued when King Charles I attempted to disafforest the Chase in 1630. Ultimately, only one third was disafforested, and commissioners were appointed to ensure any further encroachments did not leave the common lands as the most meagre in quality. This system lasted until the 1800s.

In 1884, the Malvern Hills Conservators were established through an Act of Parliament to preserve the natural aspect of the hills and protect them from encroachments. However, by this time large-scale quarrying had already begun. Quarry works were set in motion in the 1870s at Tank Quarry and at Little Malvern by Pyx Granite Company. The Hills Conservators lobbied parliament to pass an Act limiting the exploitation, and although a second Act was passed in 1924 its provisions were largely ineffective. Quarrying continued until 1966. The landscape itself was irrevocably changed; but there is some debate whether this has enriched or damaged the ecology of the Hills. Certainly the quarrying has changed the Hills forever, including creating habitats for frogs, toads, newts and other small animals. The new cliffs provide nesting sites for certain birds. The quarries, especially North Quarry and Tank Quarry, have over the years been the sites of several accidents requiring the Emergency Services.

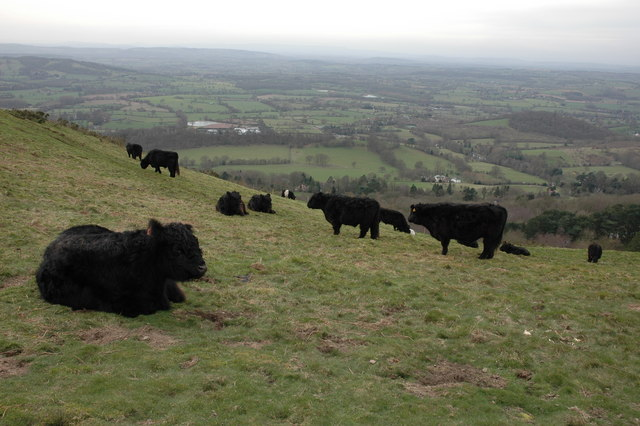
Dexter cattle on the Malvern Hills

In 1989, the cafe on Worcestershire Beacon burned down. As the Malvern Hills Acts state that no building should be erected on the Conservators' land or on land under their jurisdiction, the Conservators put a bill through Parliament to get the power to build a new one but the House of Lords opposed it. When the cafe was burned down, the Conservators had plans to replace the building but were advised that they risked prosecution for rebuilding as the original cafe building was an encroachment on common land. The Malvern Hills Bill was in preparation to modernise some of the clauses in previous acts a clause was inserted to gain authority to rebuild the cafe. Five members of the House of Lords Select Committee visited the Malvern Hills and decided that there were enough facilities in the immediate area and that St Ann's Well cafe should be enough provision on the hills, so the application to rebuild was turned down.

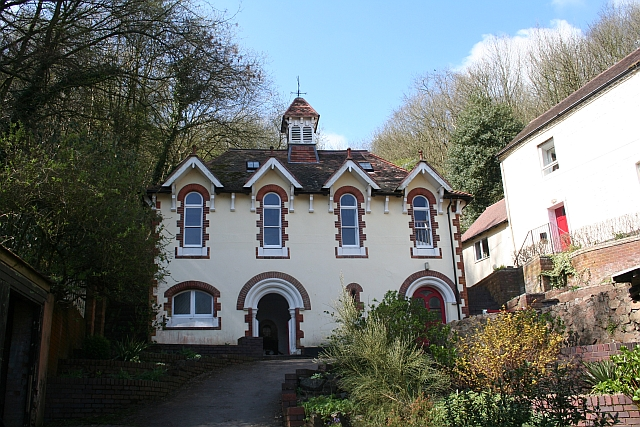
The Holy Well, Malvern. With the aid of a Lottery Heritage grant, production of 1200 bottles per day of Holy Well Spring Water was recommenced.

In 2000, a £1.3 million project to reintroduce grazing animals to the Malvern Hills and restore part of its historic network of water spouts was given significant backing of National Lottery funds. The Malverns Heritage Project aimed to reintroduce grazing animals as a natural means of scrub management and restore several water features. The project was spearheaded by the Malvern Hills AONB Service, in partnership with Worcestershire County Council, Herefordshire Council, Malvern Hills Conservators, Malvern Spa Association, English Nature, Countryside Agency, National Trust and English Heritage. Members of the public were concerned that by erecting temporary fences on the Malvern Hills the Conservators would be straying from their core duty of keeping the Malvern Hills unenclosed as open spaces for the recreation and enjoyment of the public. Although the conservation officer said any enclosures would be small and temporary there were worries that leisure activities could be affected and that "the feeling of freedom associated with 'just being' on the Malvern Hills" could be lost.

In 2001, the Malvern Hills were officially closed to the public for the first time in history. Walkers were told to avoid the area as part of the effort to prevent the spread of foot and mouth disease. As a result of the closure the economy of the Malvern Hills faced serious damage. In 2002 the Malvern Hills were named the most popular free tourist attraction in the West Midlands in a survey commissioned by the Countryside Agency to take the temperature of rural tourism in the wake of the crisis.

In 2006, Worcestershire County Council was awarded £770,000 by the Heritage Lottery Fund for restoration work and preservation of the area by fitting cattle grids to roads across the Hills and encouraging local landowners to allow sheep to wander across their land. As part of the Malvern Heritage Project nine water features within the AONB were also renovated.

== Governance ==
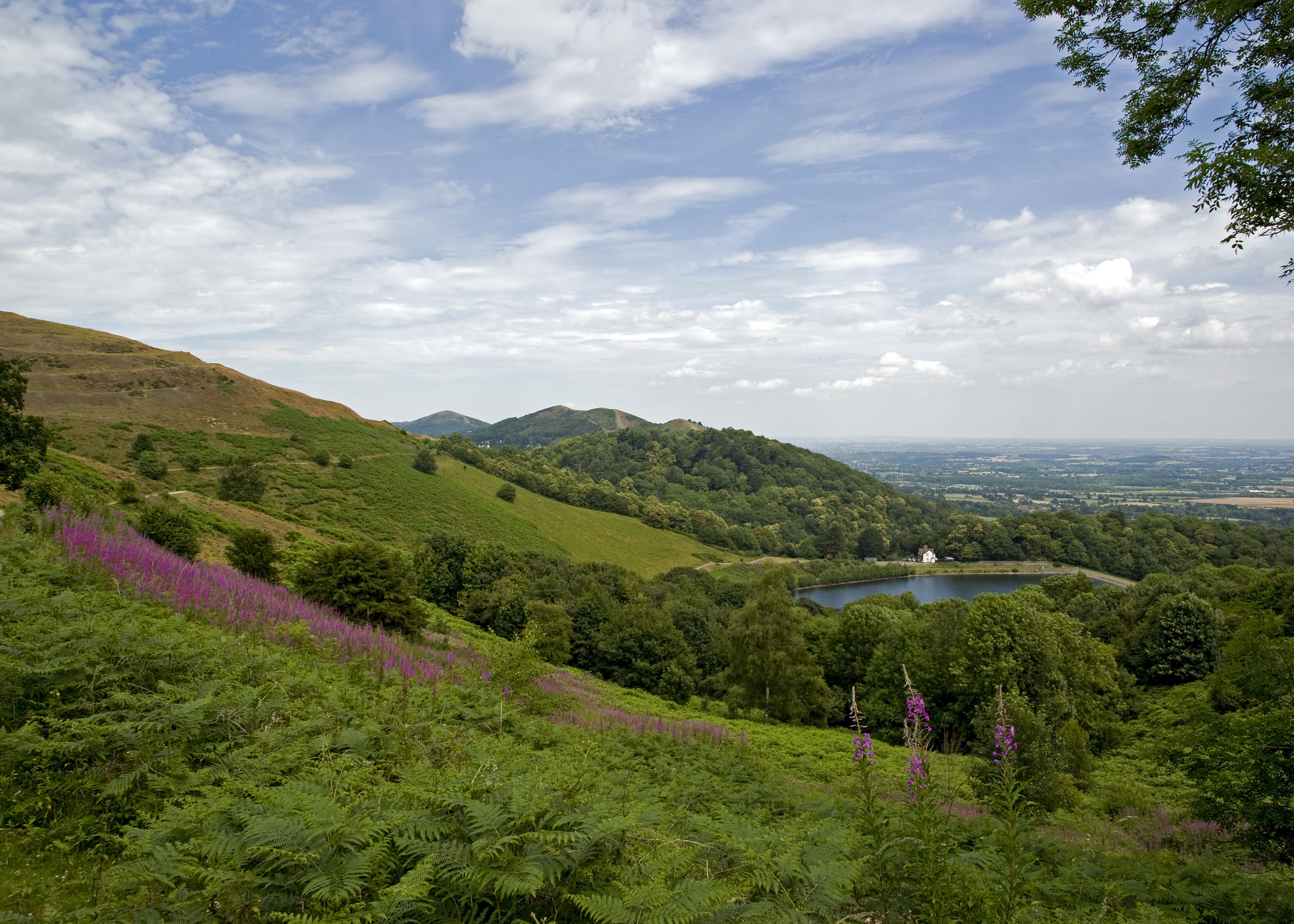
Malvern Hills with the British Camp on the left

The Malvern Hills Trust is the working name for the Malvern Hills Conservators and manages most parts of the Hills and the surrounding Commons, some other parcels of land and many roadside verges. They were established in 1884 and are governed by five Acts of Parliament, the Malvern Hills Acts 1884, 1909, 1924, 1930 and 1995. They are a voluntary body of twenty-nine members. Eleven are directly elected under the Local Elections (Principal areas) Rules by the residents of the wards who contribute to the Conservators' funds through a levy in their Council Tax, seventeen are appointed by local authorities and one by the Church Commissioners. The total area under their jurisdiction is over 1,200 hectares (3,000 acres).

The Malvern Hills were designated an Area of Outstanding Natural Beauty (AONB) in 1959. The designation covers 105 square kilometres (41 sq mi) and includes parts of Herefordshire, Worcestershire and Gloucestershire. The Malvern Hills Conservators played a key role in ensuring that the area of the AONB is larger than that originally proposed.

The AONB Partnership work together to conserve and enhance the Malvern Hills AONB. The Partnership has a formal structure including representatives from private and public enterprises, officers from local authorities, the Countryside Agency and the Malvern Hills Conservators.

== Sport, leisure, and tourism ==
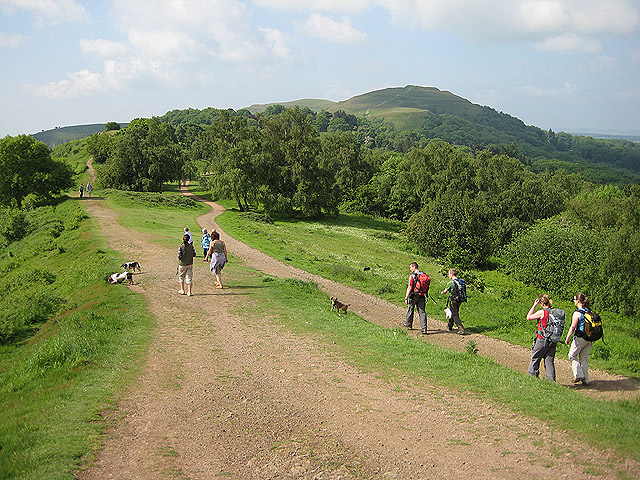
Walkers on the Malvern Hills

The Malvern Hills are home to a wide range of outdoor sports and leisure activities, including walking, mountain biking, horse riding, orienteering, hang-gliding, paragliding, model aircraft flying, fishing, climbing and diving.

The Worcestershire Way is a waymarked long-distance trail located within the county of Worcestershire. It runs 50 km (31 miles) from Bewdley to Great Malvern. It is an important recreation resource in the AONB.

The Geopark Way is a 175 km (109 miles) long-distance trail which runs from Bridgnorth to Gloucester and passes through the Abberley and Malvern Hills Geopark. The route was devised to highlight geology, landscape and associated heritage. The Malvern Hills Geocentre is located halfway along the Geopark Way, at the Wyche. This official visitor centre gives more information on interactive iPads about the geology, nature and history of the Geopark and the Malvern hills and Malvern in particular, as well as large wall maps of the area.

== Abberley and Malvern Hills Geopark ==
The Abberley and Malvern Hills Geopark was launched in 2004. It falls within the counties of Herefordshire, Gloucestershire, Shropshire and Worcestershire and covers 3,240 km^{2} (1,250 square miles). The geological and geomorphological significance of the area has been recognised for many years with 13 Sites of Special Scientific Interest (SSSI) and 179 Local Geological Sites (LGS) present.

== Transport ==
=== Trunk roads ===
The A449 road runs through the centre of Malvern, connecting it to Worcester and Ledbury. The M5 motorway to the east of Malvern is accessible at junctions 7 and 8. The M50 (also known as the Ross Spur) to the south can be accessed at junction 1 on the A38 road between Tewkesbury and Malvern.

=== Rail ===
The Cotswold railway line was originally intended to follow a flatter and more direct route north of the area, but after lobbying from residents throughout the 1850s, the railway was diverted close to - and under - the hills, to serve Malvern and Ledbury. The route passes east and south of Malvern on the Worcestershire side of the hills, crosses the range through the Colwall Tunnels, and emerges heading west on the Herefordshire side. The first tunnel was opened in 1861 after a difficult excavation through some of the hardest rock in Great Britain - following advances in machinery development, it was closed and replaced with a wider, less steep tunnel in 1926, which remains in use today. There have been proposals to reopen the abandoned older tunnel as a cycle route; it is also used by a colony of lesser horseshoe bats to hibernate in winter, and is a designated part of the Malvern Hills SSSI.

Today, the AONB has four railway stations inside or very close to its boundary: Malvern Link and Great Malvern to the east, and Colwall (just beyond the tunnel) and Ledbury to the west. Services operate between Oxford via Worcester Shrub Hill and Worcester Foregate Street to Hereford. Direct trains to the area are available from Birmingham Snow Hill or Birmingham New Street and London Paddington. There were also formerly small stations at Malvern Hanley Road, Ledbury Town Halt and Malvern Wells, which closed in 1952, 1959 and 1965 respectively.

=== Bus ===
Several local bus services connect Malvern with the surrounding area. Long-distance direct bus services connect Malvern with other cities in the country, including the National Express route 321 through eleven counties from Aberdare, South Wales, via Birmingham and other major cities to Bradford, West Yorkshire, and route 444 from Worcester to London (Victoria).

== Malvern Hills in cultural life ==
=== Music ===
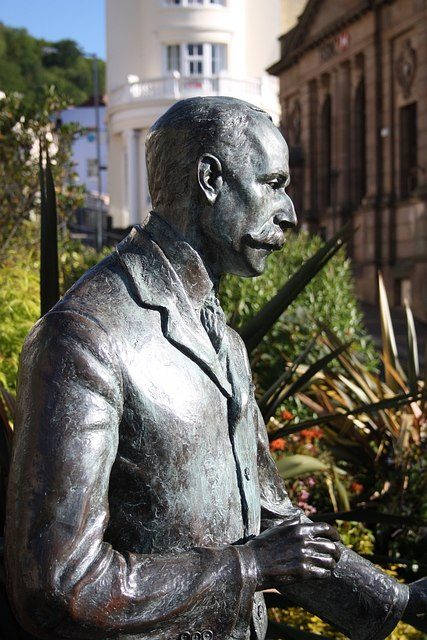
Sir Edward Elgar, Belle Vue Island, Great Malvern

English composer Edward Elgar, who was from the area, often walked, cycled, and reportedly flew kites on these hills. He wrote a cantata in 1898 entitled Caractacus, which alludes to the popular legend of his last stand at British Camp. In 1934, during the composer's final illness, he told a friend: "If ever after I'm dead you hear someone whistling this tune [from his Cello Concerto] on the Malvern Hills, don't be alarmed, it's only me."

Composers Herbert Howells and Ivor Gurney used to take long walks together through the nearby Cotswold Hills and the natural beauty of the area, including the magnificent views of the Malverns, was a profound inspiration for their music. Howells dedicated his first major work, the Piano Quartet in A minor (1916), to "the hill at Chosen (Churchdown) and Ivor Gurney who knew it".

The Swedish singer Jenny Lind spent the last years of her life living at Wynd's Point near the British Camp. She is buried in Great Malvern cemetery.

=== Literature ===
The Malvern Hills were the inspiration and setting for the famous 14th-century poem The Visions of Piers Plowman (1362) by William Langland, who was possibly educated at the priory of Great Malvern. The earliest poetical allusion to the Malvern Hills occurs in the poem: "And on a Maye mornynge on Malverne hylles".

The poet W. H. Auden taught for three years at The Downs School, Colwall, in the Malvern Hills. He spent three years at the school in the 1930s and wrote some of his finest early love poems there, including: "This Lunar Beauty"; "Lay Your Sleeping Head, My Love" ('Lullaby'); "My Love, Fish in the Unruffled Lakes"; and "Out on the Lawn I Lie in Bed". He also wrote a long poem about the hills and their views, called simply The Malverns.

J.R.R. Tolkien found inspiration in the Malvern landscape which he had viewed from his childhood home in Birmingham and his brother Hilary's home near Evesham. He was introduced to the area by C. S. Lewis, who had brought him here to meet George Sayer, the Head of English at Malvern College. Sayer had been a student of Lewis, and became his biographer, and together with them Tolkien would walk the Malvern Hills. Recordings of Tolkien reading excerpts from The Hobbit and The Lord of the Rings were made in Malvern in 1952, at the home of George Sayer. The recordings were later issued on long-playing gramophone records. In the liner notes for J.R.R. Tolkien Reads and Sings his The Hobbit & The Fellowship of the Ring, George Sayer wrote that Tolkien would relive the book as they walked and compared parts of the Malvern Hills to the White Mountains of Gondor.

The poet Elizabeth Barrett Browning spent her childhood at Hope End, a 500-acre (2.0 km^{2}) estate near the Malvern Hills in Ledbury, Herefordshire. Her time at Hope End would inspire her in later life to write Aurora Leigh.

In Early British Trackways Alfred Watkins theorised that a ley line passed along the Malvern Hills through several wells including St Ann's Well, Holy Well, Walms Well and St. Pewtress Well. Interest in Watkin's theories subsided in the 1930s but saw a revival in the late 1960s. In The Ley Hunter's Companion (1979) Paul Devereux theorised that a 10-mile alignment he called the "Malvern Ley" passed through St Ann's Well, the Wyche Cutting, a section of the Shire Ditch, Midsummer Hill, Whiteleaved Oak, Redmarley D'Abitot and Pauntley. In City of Revelation (1973) British author John Michell theorised that Whiteleaved Oak is the centre of a circular alignment he called the "Circle of Perpetual Choirs" and is equidistant from Glastonbury, Stonehenge, Goring-on-Thames and Llantwit Major. The theory was investigated by the British Society of Dowsers and used as background material by Phil Rickman in his novel The Remains of an Altar (2006). "Malvern Hills" is the third short story in Japanese-English author Kazuo Ishiguro's collection Nocturnes (2009).

The legend of the Shadow of the Ragged Stone, a shadow appearing to arise from the hilltop under particular meteorological conditions said to bring ill-fortune to those on whom it falls, features in many literary sources. It is the subject of the novel "The Shadow of the Ragged Stone" by Charles F. Grindrod, which tells the story of a monk who in punishment for breaking his vow of chastity was compelled to crawl up the hill every day on his hands and knees, and died cursing the hill and all on whom its shadow should fall.

=== Art ===
Paintings of the Malvern Hills include Henry Harris Lines's The British Camp and Herefordshire Beacon (1872), now in the Worcester City Museums.

David Prentice, founder member of Birmingham's Ikon Gallery, has been painting the Malvern Hills since 1986.

Paul Nash made paintings of the hills from 'Madams' in Gloucestershire and from the 'Rising Sun' hotel on Cleeve Hill near Cheltenham.

Dame Laura Knight painted in a studio near Wynds Point below British Camp.

=== Television ===
The opening scene in Elgar, a drama documentary made in 1962 by the British director Ken Russell, depicts a young Elgar riding a white pony over the Malvern Hills. Made for BBC Television's long-running Monitor programme, it dramatised the life of the composer Edward Elgar. The film significantly raised the public profile of the composer.

The Tank Quarry on North Hill and West of England Quarry on the Worcestershire Beacon were used as locations in the Doctor Who serial The Krotons, starring Patrick Troughton. The serial was broadcast in four weekly parts from 28 December 1968 to 18 January 1969.

The Malvern Hills are the backdrop for Penda's Fen, a 1974 British television play written by David Rudkin and directed by Alan Clarke for the BBC's Play for Today series. It tells the story of Stephen, a pastor's son who has visions of angels, Edward Elgar, and King Penda, the last pagan ruler of England. The final scene of the play, where the protagonist has an apparitional experience of King Penda and the "mother and father of England", is set on the Malvern Hills.

=== Architecture ===
A famous historic Virginia Landmark, Malvern Hill was a house built in the 17th century by an English settler, Thomas Cocke, later the site of an American Civil War battle. Cocke named his home after Malvern Hills in England.

== The hills ==
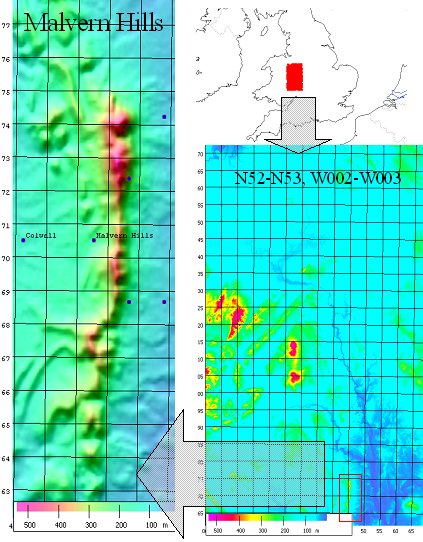
Location within England

A list of the hills in their order from north to south is shown below:

Hill	Elevation (ft)	Elevation (m)
End Hill	1,079	329
Table Hill	1,224	373
North Hill	1,303	397
Sugarloaf Hill	1,207	368
Worcestershire Beacon	1,395	425
Summer Hill	1,253	382
Perseverance Hill	1,066	325
Jubilee Hill	1,073	327
Pinnacle Hill	1,174	358
Black Hill (north)	1,011	308
Black Hill (south)	886	270
Tinkers Hill	700	213
Herefordshire Beacon (British Camp)	1,109	338
Millennium Hill	1,073	327
Broad Down	958	292
Hangman's Hill	906	276
Swinyard Hill	889	271
Midsummer Hill	932	284
Hollybush Hill	794	242
Raggedstone Hill (east top)	820	250
Raggedstone Hill (west top)	833	254
Chase End Hill	625	191

A good panorama of the length of the hills can be seen from the M5 motorway, particularly between Junction 7 at Worcester (south) and Junction 9 at Tewkesbury.

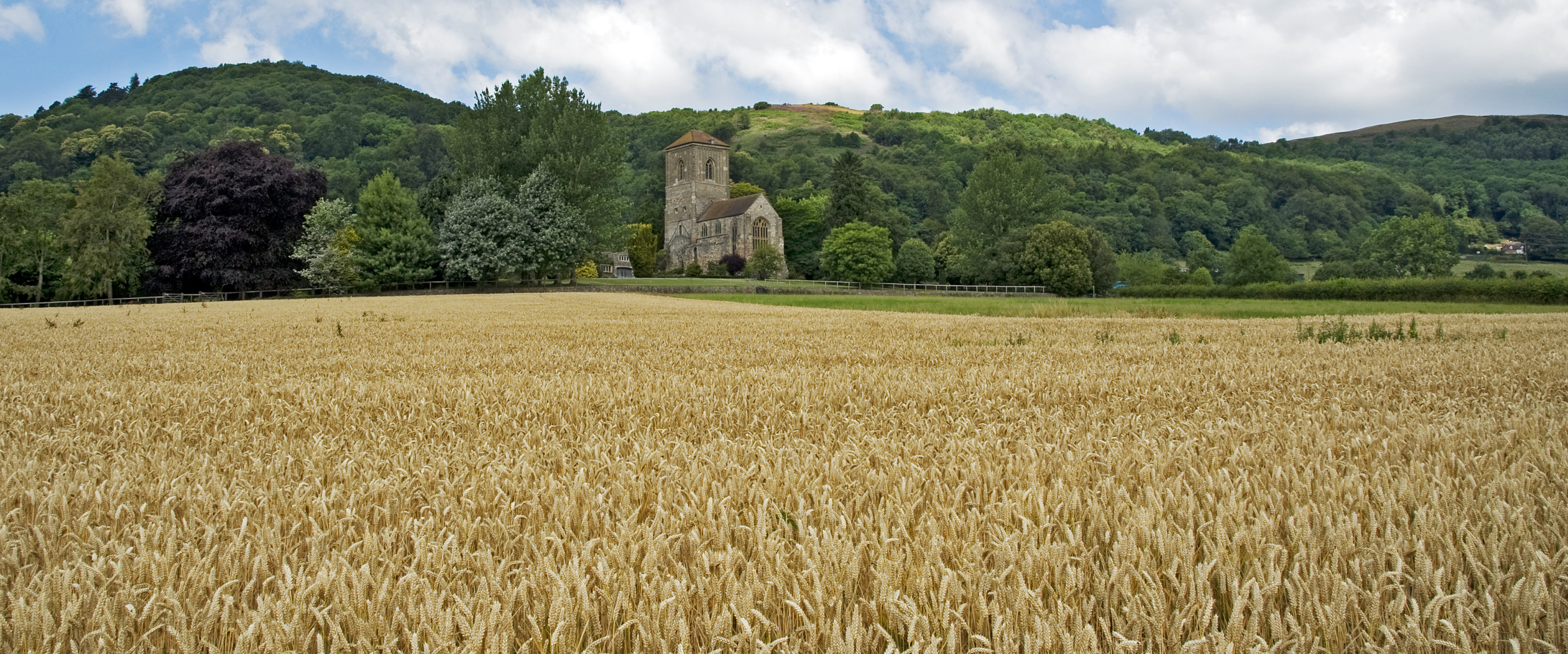
Panorama of the Malvern Hills (AONB) with Little Malvern Priory taking centre stage.

The following hills within the National Landscape have 30 metres or more of topographic prominence:

1. Worcestershire Beacon (425.1 m)
2. North Hill (397 m)
3. Pinnacle Hill (357 m)
4. Herefordshire Beacon (338 m)
5. Midsummer Hill (284 m)
6. Swinyard Hill (272 m)
7. Ragged Stone Hill (254 m)
8. High Grove Hill (245 m)
9. Frith Hill (240 m)
10. Oyster Hill (214.9 m)
11. Brockhill (211.7 m)
12. Bank Farm Hill (210 m)
13. Birchwood (206 m)
14. Rough Hill (196.2 m)
15. Woolpits Hill (194 m)
16. Mayhill (192.4 m)
17. Chase End Hill (191 m)
18. Eastnor Hill (187.3 m)
19. Howler's Heath (182 m)
20. Bagburrow Hill (180 m)
21. Halesend Wood (180 m)
22. Suckley Hills (170 m)
23. Bearswood Common (168.7 m)
24. Suckley Hills West Top (163.7 m)

== Vistas ==
Between 1999 and 2000, the Heart of England Tourist Board carried out a survey of visitors to the Malvern hills on behalf of the Malvern Hills Area of Outstanding Natural Beauty Partnership (AONB). Those questioned indicated that the thing they liked most about the hills was "the scenery and views".

[The Malvern Hills form] an island of high ground surrounded by lower lying land, most noticeably to the east. As a result, the [h]ills are clearly visible and easily recognisable from a considerable distance away [and] constitute an iconic feature in the local and regional landscape.

The AONB commissioned study to "identify and assess a selection of key views to and from the Malvern Hills" it was carried out in 2009 by Cooper Partnership Ltd, a firm of Chartered Landscape Architects. This information was gathered not only so that the best vistas could be made known to a wider public, but also as an intelligence gathering so that proposed changes to the landscape both in and outside the Malvern Hills area of outstanding beauty (such as the building of wind turbines) could be assessed against the impact those developments would have on the Malvern Hills area of outstanding beauty. The Cooper Partnership identified 50 key views from vantage points on the Malvern hills, and from the surrounding area. These were:

Vistas within the AONB boundary
Location	OS Coordinates	Importance	Sensitivity	Notes
North Hill	SO769464	Exceptional	High	"Panoramic (360°) viewpoint with far reaching views in all directions".
Worcestershire Beacon	SO768452	Exceptional	High	"Panoramic (360°) viewpoint with far reaching views in all directions".
Herefordshire Beacon (British Camp)	SO760400	Exceptional	High	"Panoramic (360°) viewpoint with far reaching views in all directions".
Chase End Hill	SO761355	Exceptional	High	"Panoramic (360°) viewpoint with far reaching views in all directions".
B4232 at Upper Wyche (looking east)	SO770438	Special	High	"Contained by the landform of the hills themselves this is an elevated outlook which has views of Great Malvern with Worcester City in the distance".
B4232 at Upper Wyche (looking west)	SO769437	Special	High	"Elevated view from western side of the Wyche cutting through the MH central spine, looking across the midwestern part of the wider MH AONB and beyond".
A438 (north-west of Eastnor)	SO727383	Special	Medium	"Oblique view of MH central spine across south-western areas of the AONB".
A449 (north-west of Eastnor)	SO726388	Special	Medium	"prominent in the left of the view, with glimpses of the Herefordshire Beacon across south western areas of the AONB".
Jubilee Drive (B4232) by Perrycroft	SO766417	Special	High	"Framed distant views of the western side of the MHAONB".
B4219 at Storridge	SO755481	Special	Medium	"Framed, narrow view from road. Low land in the fore/mid-ground and woodland vegetation hiding the intervening landform enhances the perceived height of the rising hills. Angle of view shows the boldness of the northern group of peaks with their heavy base and rounded tops".
Public footpath on Oyster Hill	SO723418	Exceptional	High	Representing view from gardens of Hope End Estate, including view from in front of the house. "Open, panoramic viewpoint (360°) with views in some directions filtered by vegetation. View 34 shows 180° looking west and north-west towards the MH central spine and wider AONB areas to the north".
B4209 by Three Counties Showground	SO788424	Special	Medium	"Wide local view of eastern elevation of MH central spine from approach road. Roadside and field boundary trees interrupt the view".
A4104 (west of Welland)	SO779403	Exceptional	High	"Wide local view of eastern elevation of MH central spine from approach road".
Public footpath near Eastnor Castle	SO752378	Exceptional	High	by obelisk within the parkland. "Panoramic (360°) viewpoint. Views are generally enclosed by vegetation and the MH central spine, but far reaching views are available to the south and south-west and through a narrow corridor to the north".

Vistas outside AONB boundary
Location	OS Coordinates	Distance (km)	Importance	Sensitivity	Notes
A449 through Malvern Link	SO783475	1.2	Representative	Medium	"Typical view from the A449 through urban areas of Great Malvern. Views towards the hills are framed by buildings on both sides of the road".
Public footpath at Birtsmorten	SO801357	2.0	Special	Medium	"Rural view across flat landscape of agricultural fields and scattered trees."
A4103 near Leigh Sinton	SO788514	2.5	Special	Medium	"The first wide, open view of the Malvern Hills from the A4103 when travelling southbound from the southwest fringe of Worcester. The Malvern Hills rise up from flat agricultural fields in the foreground and are prominent on the skyline of an essentially rural view".
A417 near Donnington	SO728341	3.5	Special	Medium	"View over roadside vegetation from road following the southern border of the MH AONB. Rural view across gently undulating landscape of well enclosed fields and areas of woodland cover at the south-east part of the AONB. Landform frames and directs eye to the north where the dark silhouette of Worcestershire Beacon is seen on the distant skyline".
A417 near Redmarley D'Abitot	SO761321	3.5	Special	Medium	"End-on view of MH peaks at southern end of the central spine in the mid-distance beyond undulating farmland landscape in the fore/midground".
A4103 near Stony Cross	SO723474	4.0	Special	Medium	"Open view from road, towards northwestern part of MH AONB and central hill spine. Unfolding view across undulating and well wooded rural farmland landscape with some urban elements in the fore/midground such as the A4103 and houses at Stoney Cross".
B4211 near Rhydd	SO834450	4.5	Special	Medium	View from road where roadside vegetation/buildings open up more than typical. Malvern Hills are dominant on the skyline in the centre of view, with urban areas of Great Malvern seen spreading at their foot".
B4208 near Pendock	SO789315	5.0	Special	Medium	"Essentially rural view from road, over roadside vegetation. View across large open fields towards the MH".
A4104 at M5 over-bridge (near Holly Green)	SO886420	8.5	Special	Medium	"View from road, framed by roadside vegetation which opens up as you reach elevated points of the road. Malvern Hills are prominent on the skyline travelling west along the A4104. The M5 motorway corridor and agricultural fields can be seen in the foreground".
Public bridleway at Broadheath	SO803555	9.0	Special	Medium	"Open view across rural farmland landscape towards northern parts of the AONB".
B4220 near Standford Bishop	SO690518	9.0	Special	Medium	"View from road, above tops of roadside vegetation. Northern end of Malvern Hills is prominent in the view, seen beyond foreground fields and gently undulating landscape".
B4214 at Stanley Hill	SO675440	10.0	Representative	Low	"View from road through gaps in roadside vegetation. Malvern Hills spine is prominent on skyline, although undulating hills and vegetation clutter the fore/midground. Essentially rural view across farmland and woodland".
Ketch viewpoint at southern edge of Worcester (A38 and A4440 junction)	SO863516	10.0	Special	High	"Panoramic (180°) view from dedicated viewing point to overlook historic battlefield (green fields in the foreground). Essentially rural view across flat River Severn floodplain seen in fore/mid-ground, urbanised by the busy A4440 road corridor, pylons and overhead power-lines and views of urban areas of Great Malvern at the foot of Worcestershire Beacon and North Hill in the distance".
M5 over-bridge at Green Street Road	SO867491	10.1	Representative	Medium	"Elevated view from M5 overbridge. Highway structures and traffic on M5 in foreground. Flat, low-lying landform of the River Avon and Severn vales to both sides of the motorway".
Bringsty Common (Common land)	SO697548	10.4	Special	Medium	"Open, wide panoramic (180°) view towards the north-western parts of the MH AONB and northern group of hills along the central spine line. In the fore/mid-ground views of a rural, well wooded, intricately undulating landscape of the River Teme and its tributary valleys, and the eastern edge of the Bromyard Plateau with scattered farmsteads and houses".
Collins' Green viewpoint (B4197)	SO740573	11.0	Special	Medium	"from side of road across rural countryside. Far reaching views across flat, open landscape of the Severn and Avon Vales to the left and centre of view. Grey silhouette of Bredon Hill at the edge of the Cotswolds seen on the distant skyline at the centre of view. MH and more hilly landscape to its west and north seen in the right of view".
Over Old Road near Woolridge	SO803244	11.0	Special	Medium	"View from road, over roadside vegetation. Flat Severn Floodplain in the fore/mid-ground, May Hill, areas within the Forest of Dean and southern fringes of the MH AONB and MH central spine on the distant skyline. Essentially rural view of settled farmed landscape. Medium-sized fields well enclosed by hedgerows and some small areas of woodland. Urban areas of Newent, scattered small groups of housing and houses at Hartpury seen in the midground".
Croome Court (National Trust)	SO886450	11.7	Exceptional	High	"Open view across landscaped parkland, with designed views towards the MH. Croome Court and lake seen to the left of view, and Panorama Tower seen on high ground on the other side of the M5 motorway (from foreground parkland) to the centre of view".
Track near Durlow Common PROW	SO624381	12.4	Special	Medium	"Wide panoramic (180°) view through gap in field boundary hedgerow. Essentially rural view across a gently undulating agricultural landscape of arable/pasture fields, polytunnels associated with fruit farms and woodland cover associated with hill slopes. On the distant skyline, the dark silhouette of the Cotswold Scarp is seen to the right, and tops of Titterstone Clee Hill and Clent Hills glimpsed to the left of the MH central hill spine and wider AONB on the intermediate skyline at the centre of view. Urban areas of Ledbury seen at the foot of the hills in the midground in right of view. Bromyard Plateau to the left of view".
Hill View Road, Upper Strensham near M5 junction 8	SO901397	13.3	Representative	Low	"Wide panoramic (180°) view towards Malvern Hills, over roadside hedge. Malvern Hills dominant on the skyline, rising up from contrasting flat Severn Flood Plain in the foreground. An essentially rural view from edge of small settlement of Upper Strensham. M5 motorway corridor seen to the right of view".
A438 over-bridge north-west of Tewkesbury Road	SO889337	13.7	Representative	Medium	"Elevated view from bridge crossing over River Severn, across rural agricultural landscape. Views towards MH part framed by intervening landform".
Footpath and road on Much Marcle Ridge (from Herefordshire Trail LDF)	SO889337	13.7	Exceptional	High	"Elevated view from bridge crossing over River Severn, across rural agricultural landscape. Views towards MH part framed by intervening landform."
Ronkswood Hill Meadows, (Worcester Public Open Space, Local Nature Reserve)	SO872555	13.8	Special	Medium	"Panoramic view from highest point within park. Urban areas of Worcester seen spreading on the low lying River Severn vale in the midground, including view of Worcester Cathedral. MH central spine line and linear group of hills to the north form a grey silhouette on the skyline, as a backdrop to the city".
May Hill (National Trust owned Common Land)	SO695223	15.0	Representative	Medium	"Oblique view from gap in field boundary hedgerow at field gate. Far reaching views across rural countryside. Sloping land and gentle undulations reveal and hide the midground landscape".
Public footpath Bredon Hill by the Banbury Stone Tower	SO955400	15.5	Exceptional	High	"Panoramic (360°) view, affording full views of the eastern side of the Malvern Hills AONB to the west, in the context of other larger hill groups/mountain ranges in the distance and smaller hills rising from the flat Severn Plain in the middle ground. A rural view, although there is much visual evidence of urbanisation along the M5 corridor and at Great Malvern".
A438 at Bartestree (western edge of Hereford)	SO565414	18.4	Representative	Low	"Glimpsed view from road through gaps in housing and roadside vegetation. Semi-urban view from edge of Hereford".
Hegdon Hill (near Leominster)	SO587536	19.2	Representative	Low	"Framed view through and above field boundary hedgerows. Long length of Malvern Hills seen rising above gently undulating rural farm land in the foreground, and dominant on the skyline; hills are seen in the context of their wider landscape setting".
Cleeve Hill (Common Land)	SO985266	25.0	Special	High	"180-degree panoramic view from elevated viewpoint on north-west facing slope of Cleeve Hill. Distant hills make up an almost continuous skyline, of which the Malvern Hills are a part of. Urban areas of Gloucester and Cheltenham seen in the foreground spreading on the lower lying land of the Severn and Avon Vales. Industrial warehouses and large scale developments stand out in the view".
Public footpath on Haresfield Beacon (National Trust owned Common Land)	SO821088	26.0	Special	High	"Panoramic (180°) viewpoint. Views filtered by wooded vegetation, and seasonal change likely in view. Malvern Hills seen on skyline to the left, rising above the flat Severn Plain. Large urban areas of Gloucester in the midground, in the centre of view and more rural and wooded areas within the Forest of Dean spread to the left of view".
B4202 near Clows Top	SO821088	26.0	Representative	Low	"Framed view from road. Malvern Hills seen rising above intermediate hills in the distance. Undulating, rural countryside unfolds in fore/midground".
Track near Westhope Hill	SO478522	28.0	Representative	Low	"Glimpsed view from road through gaps in housing and roadside vegetation. Semi-urban view from edge of Hereford".
38 Cockyard (from lane)	SO411340	33.6	Representative	Low	"Glimpsed view from road through gaps in housing and roadside vegetation. Semi-urban view from edge of Hereford. ... Characteristic western elevation silhouette of the tops of peaks along MH central spine from North Hill to Herefordshire Beacon is seen on part of the skyline, in the context of intervening hills and ridges of the mid/foreground".
B4066 Taits Hill near Stinchcombe Hill	SO734999	34.0	Special	Low	"Roadside view. Malvern Hills seen in the distance in the context of other hills. The ridge line of the Wye Valley within the Forest of Dean and May Hill are more dominant in the view. The Severn Estuary can be seen lying across the lower land of the Severn plain. Urban areas of Gloucester are glimpsed at the right of view. Essentially a view of rural areas at the outskirts of urban areas".
Public footpath on Balis's Hill (near Honeybourne)	SP123452	35.0	Representative	Medium	"Open view of Malvern Hills seen in context of other hills on skyline. Essentially rural setting of agricultural fields in foreground".
Common land south of Titterstone Clee Hill	SO599770	35.0	Special	Medium	"Far reaching panoramic (360°) views of hill ranges to the south, west and north. Central spine of the Malvern Hills seen intruding into the skyline at the centre of view, in the context of other ridgelines in the foreground, and May Hill and the Black Mountains in the distance. The nearby radar station and quarry give a slight industrial feel, but it is an essentially rural view across an intricate landscape of farmland and scattered settlements. Views to the north-west (not shown) are more mountainous and dramatic. ... The whole length of the Malvern Hills spine can be seen as a grey silhouette against the sky. The hills represent a small part of the view, but are recognisable by their unique outline.".
Clent Hills Country Park near Hagley (public open space)	SO927799	36.0	Special	High	"180-degree panoramic view towards the south-west from elevated viewpoint on SW facing slope of Clent Hills, affording long-distance views. Malvern Hills seen to the left of view in the context of other hill ranges seen to the centre and right of view. Generally hilly foreground with scattered settlements on lower lying land. Urban areas of Kidderminster and Stourbridge seen in centre mid-ground ... Far-fetching views of hill ranges, including that of Malvern Hills is impressive, across a generally rural setting".

== See also ==
- Malvern
- Great Malvern
- Malvern Hills Conservators
- Areas of Outstanding Natural Beauty in England
- List of Sites of Special Scientific Interest in Herefordshire
- List of Sites of Special Scientific Interest in Worcestershire
- List of Sites of Special Scientific Interest in Gloucestershire
- Malvern Hills District Council
