= Herefordshire Beacon =

Hill in the Malvern Hills, England

Coordinates: 52.0582°N 2.3518°W

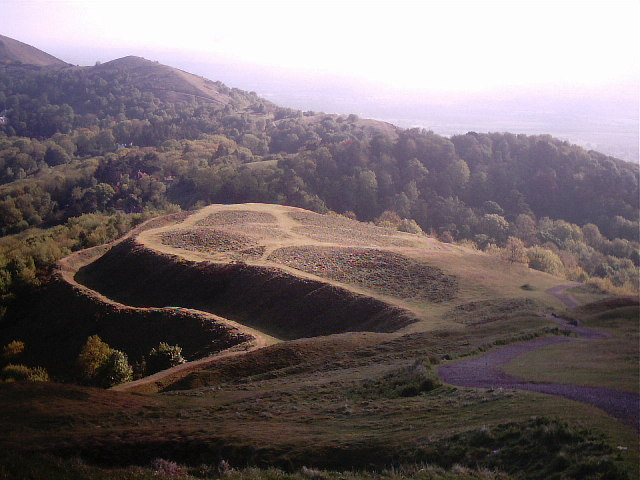
- Herefordshire Beacon

Highest point
- Elevation: 338 m (1,109 ft)

Geography
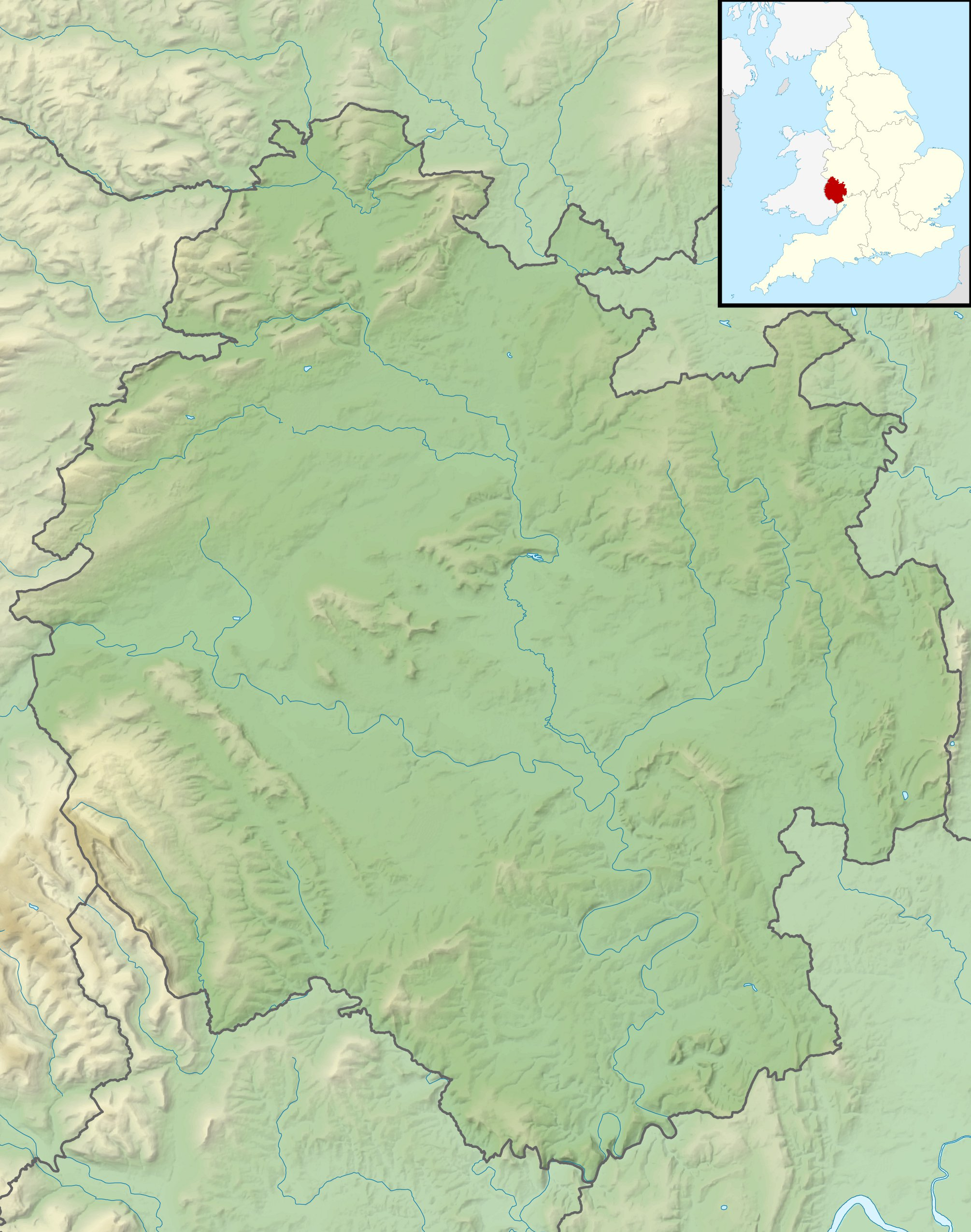
- Location within Herefordshire
- Location: Malvern Hills, England
- Topo map: OS Landranger 150

Geology
- Rock age: Pre-Cambrian
- Mountain type(s): Igneous, Metamorphic

Climbing
- Easiest route: Hiking

The Herefordshire Beacon is one of the highest peaks of the Malvern Hills. It is surrounded by a British Iron Age hill fort earthwork known as British Camp. The fort subsequently had a ringwork and bailey castle built inside its boundary and there is evidence of 120 huts in the area. British Camp has been a scheduled monument since 1923.

On the eastern slope of Herefordshire Beacon, there is a disused reservoir, British Camp Reservoir, which holds approximately 213,000 cubic metres (7,500,000 cu ft) of water.

== Geography ==
Herefordshire Beacon represents one of the Malvern Hills, and is 1,109 feet (338 m) high. It is within the county of Herefordshire, but is directly adjacent to the border with Worcestershire to the east.

== British Camp ==
Atop Herefordshire Beacon, there is an Iron Age hill fort, known as British Camp, and would have held a settlement between 4th century BCE and 1st century CE. A ringwork and bailey castle was built within the site of the hill fort, and there is evidence of 120 huts having been built within the boundaries of the fort. The hill fort received scheduled monument status on 10 August 1923.

Nearby to British Camp, on the eastern slope of Herefordshire Beacon, there is a reservoir called British Camp Reservoir. It has a capacity of 213,000 cubic metres (7,500,000 cu ft), although it has not been used for many years. In 2017, Severn Trent proposed to dismantle the treatment plant associated with the reservoir and drain it, leaving an 8,000 cubic metres (280,000 cu ft) pond.
