= Malvern Hills Conservators =

Environmental trust in Malvern, England

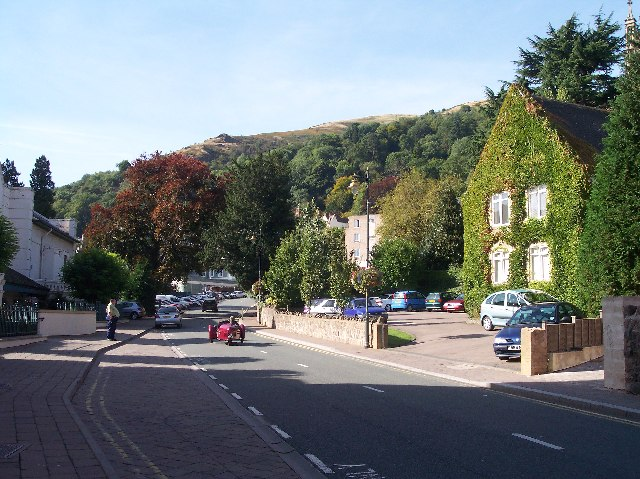
- Founded: 1884
- Type: Registered charity
- Location: Manor House, Grange Road, Great Malvern
- Region served: The Malvern Hills
- Website: www.malvernhills.org.uk

The Malvern Hills Conservators are a body corporate responsible for the care and management of the Malvern Hills and commons. They were established in 1884 and are governed by five acts of Parliament. They became a registered charity in 1984 and since April 2017 use the working name of the Malvern Hills Trust.

== Membership ==
The conservators are a body of twenty-nine voluntary members, which meet as the Board four times a year; three Board Committees meet more regularly and conduct most of the day-to-day business.

=== Elected ===
Eleven members are directly elected under the Local Elections (Principal Areas) (England and Wales) Rules 2006 (SI 2006/3304) by the residents of the civil parishes who contribute to the conservators' funds through a levy in their council tax (similar to the precept raised for parish councils). The town of Malvern and the parish of West Malvern together return six members (one elected by each of the six district wards constituted), the parishes of Malvern Wells and Little Malvern together elect one member (they constitute one district ward), the parish of Colwall elects two members, and the parishes of Mathon and Guarlford each elect one member.

=== Appointed ===
Further, twelve members are appointed by the local authorities that cover the Malvern Hills (eight by Malvern Hills District Council, two by Herefordshire Council and two by Worcestershire County Council), the parish councils of Colwall and Mathon each appoint a member, Worcestershire County Council appoint further members on behalf of parishes (one each for Powick, Newland and Castlemorton) and one member is appointed by the Church Commissioners.

== Statutory duties ==
Malvern Hills Act 1884
- Act of Parliament
- Parliament of the United Kingdom
- Long title: An Act for the prevention of Encroachments upon the Malvern Hills, and for other purposes.
- Citation: 47 & 48 Vict. c. clxxv

Dates
- Royal assent: 28 July 1884

Text of statute as originally enacted

Malvern Hills Act 1909
- Act of Parliament
- Parliament of the United Kingdom
- Long title: An Act for conferring further powers upon the Malvern Hills Conservators and for other purposes.
- Citation: 9 Edw. 7. c. xxxvii

Dates
- Royal assent: 16 August 1909

Malvern Hills Act 1924
- Act of Parliament
- Parliament of the United Kingdom
- Long title: An Act for conferring further powers upon the Malvern Hills Conservators and for other purposes.
- Citation: 14 & 15 Geo. 5. c. xxxvi

Dates
- Royal assent: 14 July 1924

Text of statute as originally enacted

Malvern Hills Act 1930
- Act of Parliament
- Parliament of the United Kingdom
- Long title: An Act to confer further powers upon the Malvern Hills Conservators and for other purposes.
- Citation: 20 & 21 Geo. 5. c. lxxii

Dates
- Royal assent: 4 June 1930

Text of statute as originally enacted

The conservators are governed by five acts of Parliament: the Malvern Hills Act 1884 (47 & 48 Vict. c. clxxv), the Malvern Hills Act 1909 (9 Edw. 7. c. xxxvii), the Malvern Hills Act 1924 (14 & 15 Geo. 5. c. xxxvi), the Malvern Hills Act 1930 (20 & 21 Geo. 5. c. lxxii), and the Malvern Hills Act 1995 (c. iii).

Under these acts, the Malvern Hills Conservators have the following statutory duties placed upon them:

- To prevent encroachment
- To keep the hills and commons as open space for recreation
- To conserve the hills and commons
- To protect the rights of commoners to graze their livestock on the land.

== AONB Partnership ==
The formal Partnership for the Malvern Hills Area of Outstanding Natural Beauty (AONB) is a separate organisation, though does include the conservators and is also based at Manor House in Great Malvern.
