= Hollybush, Worcestershire =

Village in Worcestershire, England

Coordinates: 52.02905°N 2.341955°W

Hollybush
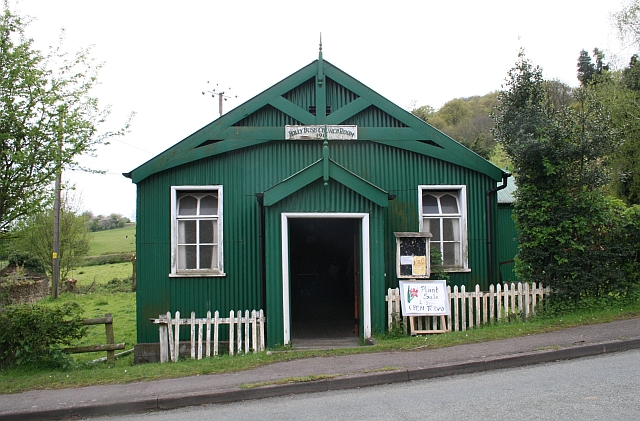
- Hollybush Church Room

- Location within Worcestershire
- OS grid reference: SO766368
  - London: 93 mi (150 km) SE
- Civil parish: Castlemorton
- District: Malvern Hills
- Shire county: Worcestershire
- Region: West Midlands
- Country: England
- Sovereign state: United Kingdom
- Post town: Ledbury
- Postcode district: HR8
- Police: West Mercia
- Fire: Hereford and Worcester
- Ambulance: West Midlands

Hollybush is a small village in Worcestershire at the southern end of the Malvern Hills and close to the borders of both Gloucestershire and Herefordshire. There is a small church, All Saints, and village hall but no shop or pub. The post office closed some years back as did the stone quarry.

== History ==
At the time of the 1901 census there was a blacksmith and a number of residents were recorded as being glove makers along with quarrymen, postmen and farm labourers.
