= Guarlford =

Village in Worcestershire, England

Coordinates: 52.106505°N 2.273183°W

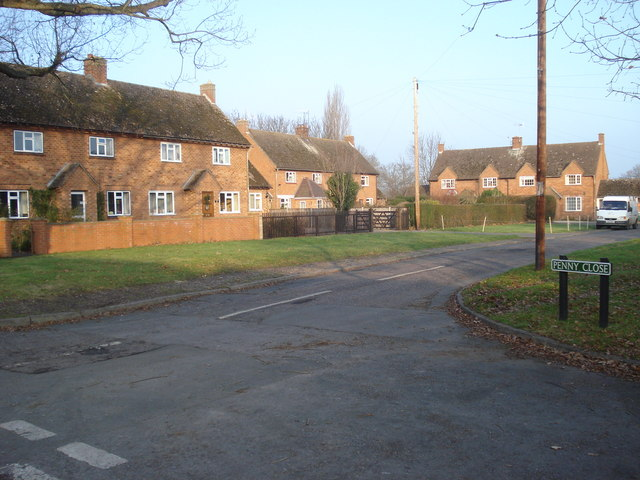
- Penny Close

- Location within Worcestershire
- Population: 261 (2021)
- Civil parish: Guarlford
- District: Malvern Hills
- Shire county: Worcestershire
- Region: West Midlands
- Country: England
- Sovereign state: United Kingdom
- Post town: Malvern
- Postcode district: WR13
- Police: West Mercia
- Fire: Hereford and Worcester
- Ambulance: West Midlands
- UK Parliament: West Worcestershire

Guarlford is a village and civil parish in the Malvern Hills district in the county of Worcestershire, England. The parish population was 261 in 2021.

The village is situated between the settlements of Barnards Green and Rhydd approximately three kilometres (two miles) east of Great Malvern, the town centre of Malvern. The village is compact, and has a parish church, St Mary's; the Church of England parish includes Madresfield village. Guarlford is in the administrative area of Malvern Hills District Council and is part of the informal region known as The Malverns.

== History ==
Settlements in Guarlford have existed for around 4,000 years. and have been known as Garford (Lay Subsidy Rolls 1275), Gerleford (Lay Subsidy Rolls 1333), Garleford (Valor Ecclesiasticus 1535), Galvert (Map of Worcestershire 1820), and Galfords (Ordnance Survey 1830).

Guarlford is one of the earliest inhabited places in the Malvern area and shows evidence of Neolithic activity with crop marks dating from a period that extends from 2350 BC to 409 AD. The Hwicce, an Anglo-Saxon tribe cleared land which may be the site of the existing Guarlford Court.

The first parish council was established in December 1894 according to a new Local Government act, and covered much of eastern Malvern including parts of Great Malvern, Pickersleigh, Poolbrook, Barnards Green, Hall Green, and Sherrards Green. In 1934 following a review, the boundaries were changed, and those areas came under the control of the Malvern council.

During World War II a radio listening post was set up in Rectory Lane by the Telecommunications Research Establishment (TRE) to monitor enemy communications, which was instrumental in locating the German V-2 rocket base in Peenemünde that was subsequently bombed by the RAF in Operation Crossbow.
