= Ed Elliott =

English sculptor

- Born: Edward Morrison Elliott; 1985 (age 40–41); Worcester, UK
- Education: Cardiff School of Art & Design
- Known for: Sculpture
- Notable work: include Greer
- Awards: h.Art 2012 Young Artist's Bursary

Edward Morrison Elliott (born 1985) is an English sculptor who won a commission in 2011 to create a large wooden angel for the National Trust.

Elliott, who won the Hereford based h.Art 2012 Young Artist's Bursary, was educated at The Chase School in Barnards Green, Malvern, Worcestershire. and obtained a BA(Hons) in Fine Art (Sculpture) from Cardiff School of Art & Design in 2008. His angel sculpture Greer has a 14' (4.26m) wingspan, carved from London Plane wood from the Mottisfont Estate and was commissioned by the National Trust, The sculpture which was installed on the Trust's Mottisfont Estate near Romsey in Hampshire, is now part of a collection in Essex alongside sculptures by Antony Gormley, Elisabeth Frink, and Thomas Heatherwick.

Elliott's works have also been exhibited in New Zealand, Italy, and Vietnam. He lives (as of 2012) in Malvern, and maintains a studio in Ledbury, Herefordshire, near Malvern
