= The Chase School =

Coordinates: 52.10303°N 2.31005°W

Location
- Geraldine Road; Malvern, Worcestershire, WR14 3NZ; England

Information
- Type: Secondary Comprehensive. Academy Converter
- Motto: A school of excellence
- Established: 1953
- Local authority: Worcestershire
- Department for Education URN: 137625 Tables
- Ofsted: Reports
- Chair: C Cobban
- Headteacher: Mike Fieldhouse
- Staff: 112
- Gender: Mixed
- Age: 11 to 18
- Enrolment: 1,332 (October 2021) of which 275 in sixth form.
- Colours: Navy blue, gold
- Publication: Prospectus
- Twitter: @TheChaseMalvern
- Website: chase.worcs.sch.uk

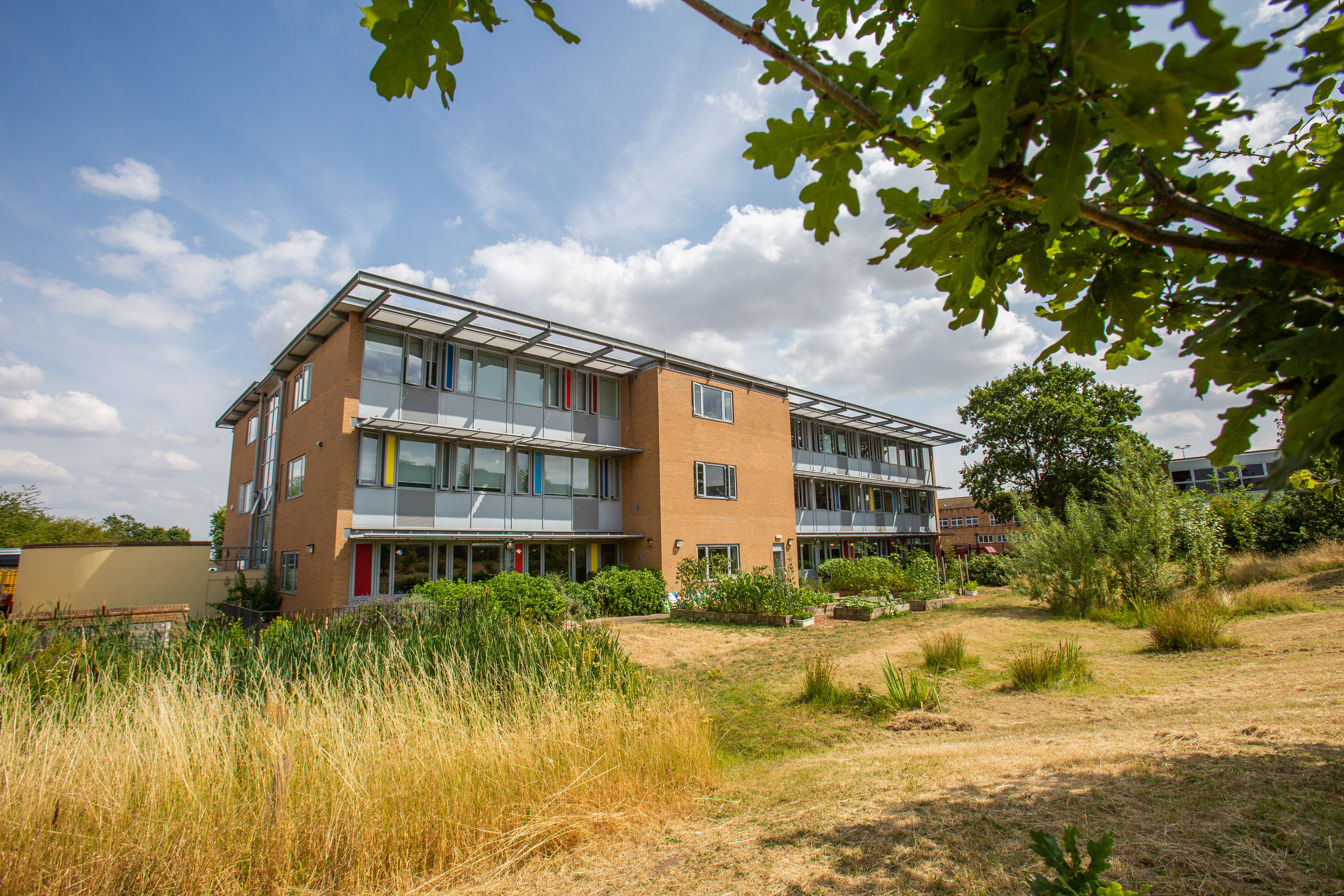
The Chase School Science Block

The Chase School is a secondary school (ages 11–18) in Malvern, Worcestershire, England. The school opened as a Secondary Modern in 1953 under headteacher Mr Garth. It was officially opened by Lord Cobham on 26 March 1955. The Chase became a comprehensive with the abolition of selective education in Worcestershire in 1974 and became an academy on 1 November 2011. The school teaches students from Year 7 to Year 13. As of 20 January 2026, The Chase has around 1,400 total students, making it one of the larger schools in Worcestershire, with around 300 of those students in the sixth form. The maximum capacity of the school is stated as 1,679 total students. 17.63% of students require SEN support.

The school is in Barnards Green, a suburb of Malvern, adjacent to the sites of QinetiQ and the Malvern Hills Science Park. Links between the school and these organisations have led to the establishment of the Cyber-security Apprentice Development Scheme, an apprenticeship initiative aimed to encourage more students into the cyber security sector.

== Background ==
The Chase School has been a specialist schools programme Technology College since 1999, and was awarded Beacon school status in 2002. The school achieved Artsmark Gold status in 2001 for excellence in art and design, drama, music, creative writing and public speaking. The Chase School is also a Language College (French, German (although as of 2021, German is no longer taught at examination level) Spanish and Japanese). The school has Sportsmark Gold status, awarded to schools by Sport England for excellent provision of Physical Education and school sport.

Former headmaster Richard Jacobs started in 2013, taking over from Kevin Peck who had started in 2002. Peck was appointed when the previous headteacher retired; David Fawbert had been awarded the Order of the British Empire (OBE) for his services to education during his tenure. Current headmaster, Mike Fieldhouse, was appointed in 2017.

In 2019, the school was named a computing hub for the National Centre for Computing Education.

A recent Ofsted inspection on 19 and 29 October 2021 rated the school 'Good' with the Sixth Form ranked as Grade 1 (Outstanding). The inspectors noted under 'What does the school need to do to improve?' required improvements that "A minority of staff do not implement the behaviour policy consistently. As a result, pupils are unsure of how adults respond to different behaviours, and so they can experience some disruption to learning. Leaders should ensure that all staff understand and consistently uphold the school’s high expectations for pupils’ behaviour."

Another Ofsted inspection was carried out on 20 January 2026, with the school receiving 'Expected standards' for 6 categories and 'Needs attention' for 'Attendance and behaviour'.

== Buildings ==
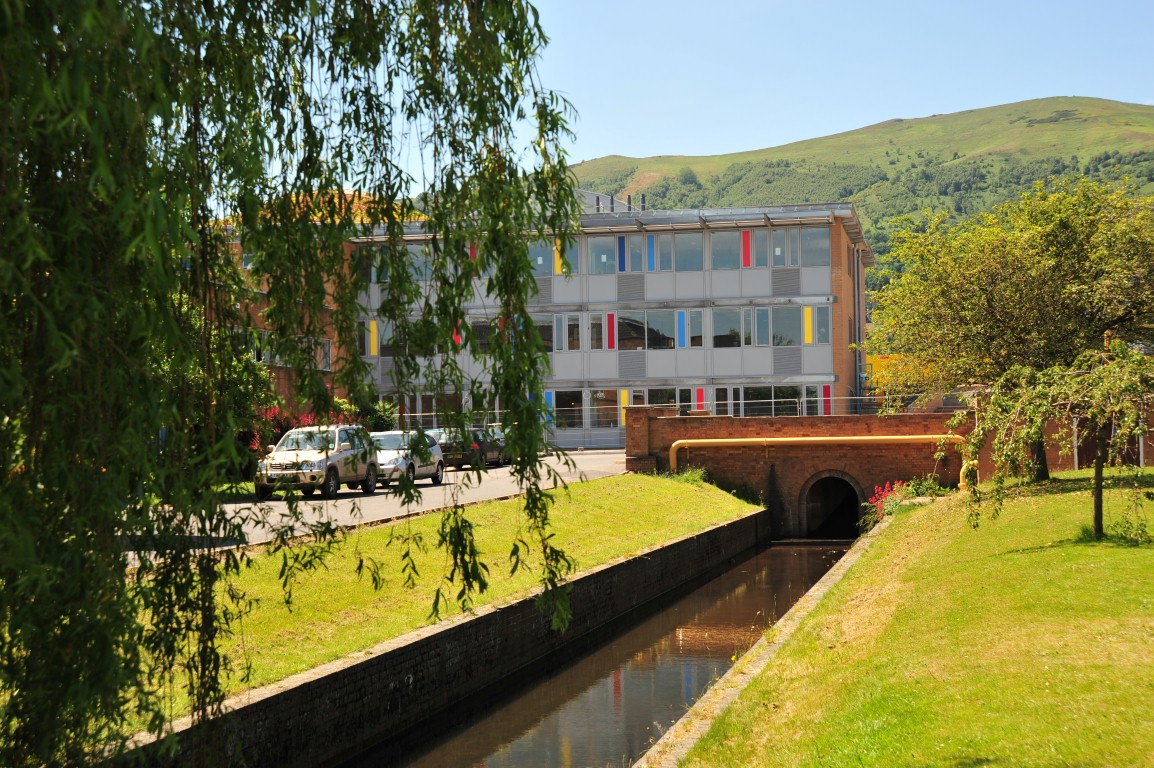
A view of the stream in front of the Science Block with the Malvern Hills in the background

The Chase School library opened in September 2006 and was officially opened on 23 February 2007, by the 2009-2019 poet laureate Carol Ann Duffy. The library is situated adjacent to the main ground floor block.

In 2014 local MP Harriett Baldwin opened the new £1 million humanities block, a new two-storey building featuring seven classrooms and separate male and female toilets.

== Achievements ==
In 2016 the school won a record eighth best team trophy at the Worcestershire Schools' Sailing and Canoeing Association (WSSCA) OnBoard Regatta.

The school's links with local technology companies have enabled them to develop apprenticeships in cyber security. In 2015 a team representing The Chase secured the runners-up prize in the national finals of the UK Cyber Centurion Competition and second in the international competition.

The Chase achieved top marks in the 2012 Business, Accountancy and Skills Education competition run by the Institute of Chartered Accountants in England and Wales (ICAEW). They have also been successful in Young Enterprise.

== Notable alumni ==
- Tracy Moseley — British professional racing cyclist (born 1979)
- Evie Richards — Olympic cyclist
- Cher Lloyd — Singer and songwriter
- Ed Elliot — Sculptor
- Phoebe Brett — English cricketer
- Tom Scutt – British designer
