= Charles Hastings (English physician) =

19th-century founder of the British Medical Association

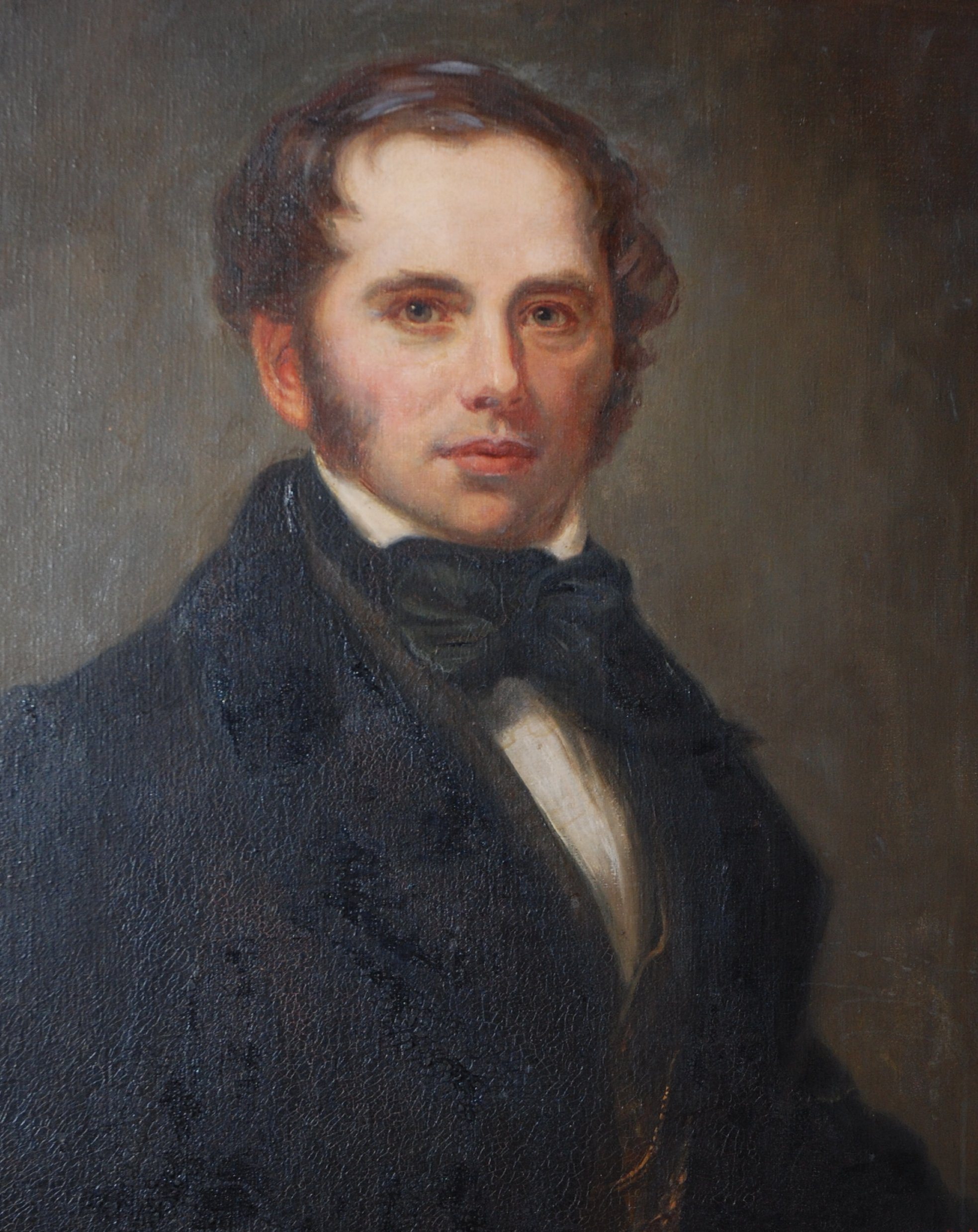
Sir Charles Hastings – artist unknown

Sir Charles Hastings (11 January 1794 – 30 July 1866) was a medical surgeon and a founder of the British Medical Association, the BMA, (then known as the Provincial Medical and Surgical Association) on 19 July 1832.

He was also a notable lifelong philanthropist, investing his own money in new housing designed to improve public health and founding the Worcester Museum of Natural History.

== Birth and early life ==
Charles Hastings was born at Ludlow in Shropshire, the ninth of 15 children born into the family of Rev. James Hastings (1756–1856), a clergyman who was rector of the church in Bitterley near Ludlow, but about to take up the position of incumbent at Martley in Worcestershire. It was in Worcestershire that he was educated and spent his formative childhood, attending Royal Grammar School Worcester. He was a younger brother of Admiral Sir Thomas Hastings.

Charles was interested in natural history as a young boy and as he matured he was drawn towards the study of medicine, especially after his father suffered an incapacitating accident. In fact it would seem he was a precocious student, becoming an apprentice to an apothecary initially then attending anatomy school in London at age 16 and becoming house surgeon at Worcester Infirmary at 18 years of age. He entered the University of Edinburgh aged 21, where he was elected President of the Royal Medical Society, returning after completing his studies and gaining his medical degree in 1818, immediately to Worcester Infirmary again. He declined a lectureship at Edinburgh in order to do so.

== Campaigning work in Worcester ==
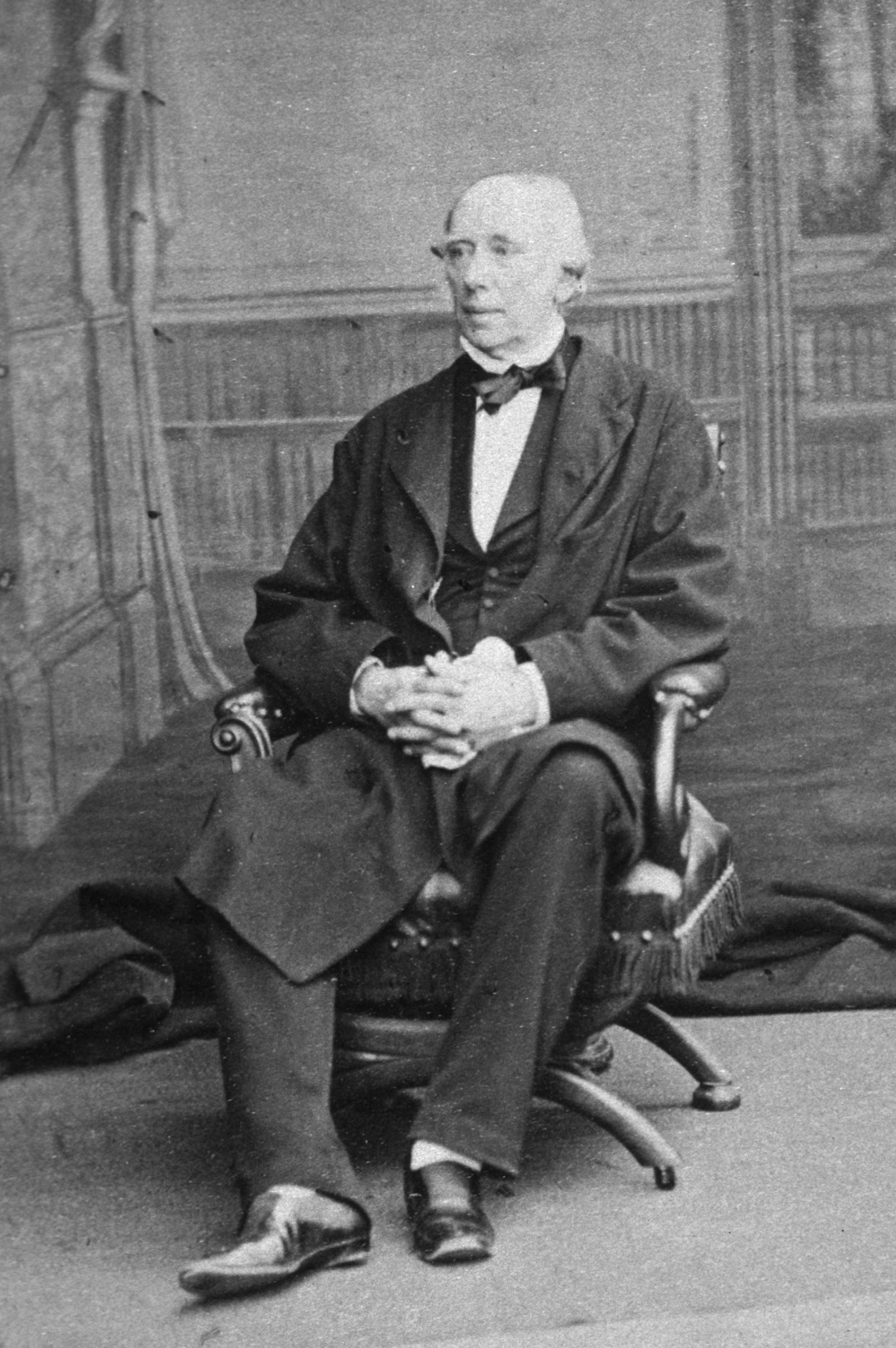
Hastings in 1864

Hastings had a close relationship with his home city, Worcester, and although he could have developed an interesting, challenging and rewarding medical career anywhere including London or Edinburgh, he started his career in the locality where he had grown up.

In 1854 he was looking for ways of investing his own money in innovative, purpose-designed living and working accommodation for Worcester's artisans. These 'modern dwellings', as he called them, were well-designed and well-built houses of varied construction types that replaced often cramped, old, crowded, medieval buildings and later cheaply built terraces and town houses which were little more than slums by Hastings' time and places where diseases such as typhus would break out in the right conditions, an all too regular development.

Cholera had broken out in Worcester many times. It spread throughout the city in 1832, claiming many lives and recurred in 1849 and 1853 taking children and workers of all ages. It is said that Hastings attended to people in every outbreak, personally seeing every single case and ministering to the sick and dying with no regard for his own health.

The new housing he had helped to introduce, for example in Copenhagen Street – now demolished in turn – was having a dramatic effect on health with the death rate dropping by 45% in a decade. However, he faced reluctance on the part of Worcester City Council to introduce measures such as introducing clean water into houses, pumps and streets. In fact, it was 1872 before legislation was on the statute books for clean water to be piped into most metropolitan areas, Worcester included.

Hastings was also a forthright critic of hydropathy.

He was knighted by Queen Victoria in 1850 for his pioneering work, resolve and social conscience.

He also founded the Worcester Museum of Natural History, hoping that it might inspire the younger generations following him to have at their disposal a valuable facility in which they could further their studies and gain an insight into the wonders of the world around them and a greater understanding of how to improve it for the greater good.

In the last years of his life, Hastings was the first chairman of the ill-fated Worcester, Bromyard and Leominster Railway, and during his tenure the operating company had spent £20,000 on line without purchasing the necessary land or signing a contract with the construction company.

== Death and legacy ==
His grave lies in Worcester's Astwood Cemetery, alongside his wife Hannah's, who predeceased him by just three months. They had two daughters, and a son, George Woodyatt Hastings, who became a local MP. He had lived out his final years at his home, Barnards Green House, in Malvern and died at age 72 on 30 July 1866.

When the new Worcestershire Royal Hospital was opened on land just outside the city of Worcester in 2002, the road for the new hospital was called Charles Hastings Way and the medical education centre was named after him.

In 2010 the University of Worcester opened its City Campus within the grounds of the former Worcester Infirmary. In honor of Hastings, the main building was named the "Charles Hastings Building". The building includes the original board room wherein the British Medical Association was founded, and a small museum dedicated to the building's past as a hospital.

== General references ==
- The Life and Times of Sir Charles Hastings, Founder of the British Medical Association (1959) Reviewed by Cohen Of Birkenhead in Med Hist. 1960 July; 4(3): 261–262.
- The Life & Times of Sir Charles Hastings (Founder of the British Medical Association) : William McMenemey.
