= Malvern, Worcestershire =

Spa town and civil parish in Worcestershire, England

Coordinates: 52.118°N 2.325°W

Malvern
- Town
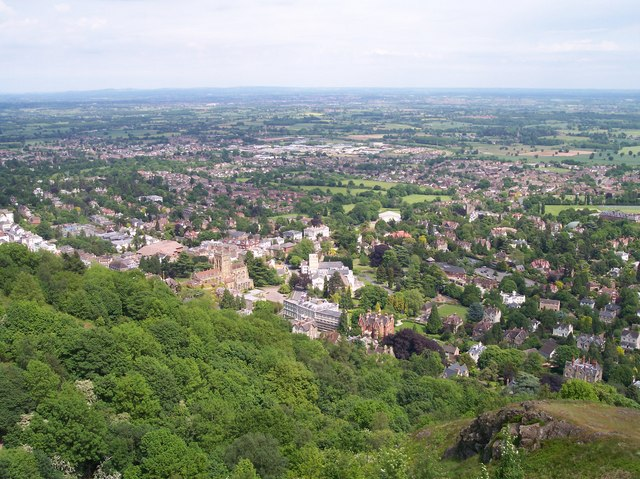
- A view over the town

- Location within Worcestershire
- Population: 30,462 (2021 census)
- OS grid reference: SO786459
  - London: 121 miles (195 km)
- Civil parish: Malvern
- District: Malvern Hills
- Shire county: Worcestershire
- Region: West Midlands
- Country: England
- Sovereign state: United Kingdom
- Post town: Malvern
- Postcode district: WR14
- Dialling code: 01684
- Police: West Mercia
- Fire: Hereford and Worcester
- Ambulance: West Midlands
- UK Parliament: West Worcestershire

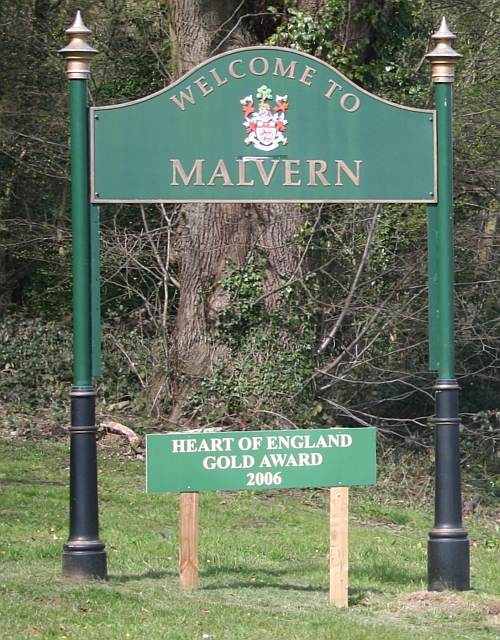
Welcome to Malvern, on an approach road to the town centre.

Malvern (/ˈmɔːlvərn, ˈmɒl-/, locally also: /ˈmɔːvərn/) is a spa town and civil parish in Worcestershire, England. It lies at the foot of the Malvern Hills, a designated National Landscape (formerly known as Areas of Outstanding Natural Beauty). The centre of Malvern, Great Malvern, is a historic conservation area, which grew dramatically in Victorian times due to the natural mineral water springs in the vicinity, including Malvern water.

At the 2021 census it had a population of 30,462. It includes Great Malvern on the steep eastern flank of the Malvern Hills, as well as the former independent urban district of Malvern Link. Many of the major suburbs and settlements that comprise the town are separated by large tracts of open common land and fields, and together with smaller civil parishes adjoining the town's boundaries and the hills, the built up area is often referred to collectively as The Malverns.

Archaeological evidence suggests that Bronze Age people had settled in the area around 1000 BC, although it is not known whether these settlements were permanent or temporary. The town itself was founded in the 11th century when Benedictine monks established a priory at the foot of the highest peak of Malvern Hills. During the 19th century Malvern developed rapidly from a village to a sprawling conurbation owing to its popularity as a hydrotherapy spa based on its spring waters. Immediately following the decline of spa tourism towards the end of the 19th century, the town's focus shifted to education with the establishment of several private boarding schools in former hotels and large villas. A further major expansion was the result of the relocation of the Telecommunications Research Establishment (TRE) to Malvern in 1942. QinetiQ, TRE's successor company, remained the town's largest local employer in 2009.

Malvern is the largest place in the parliamentary constituency of West Worcestershire and the district of Malvern Hills, being also the district's administrative seat. The civil parish is governed by Malvern Town Council from its offices in Great Malvern.

== Toponymy ==
The name Malvern is derived from Common Brittonic, an ancient British or old Welsh Celtic language moel-bryn, meaning "Bare or Bald Hill", the modern equivalent being the Welsh moelfryn (bald hill). It has been known as Malferna (11th century), Malverne (12th century), and Much Malvern (16–17th century).

== History ==
=== Bronze Age to monastic times ===
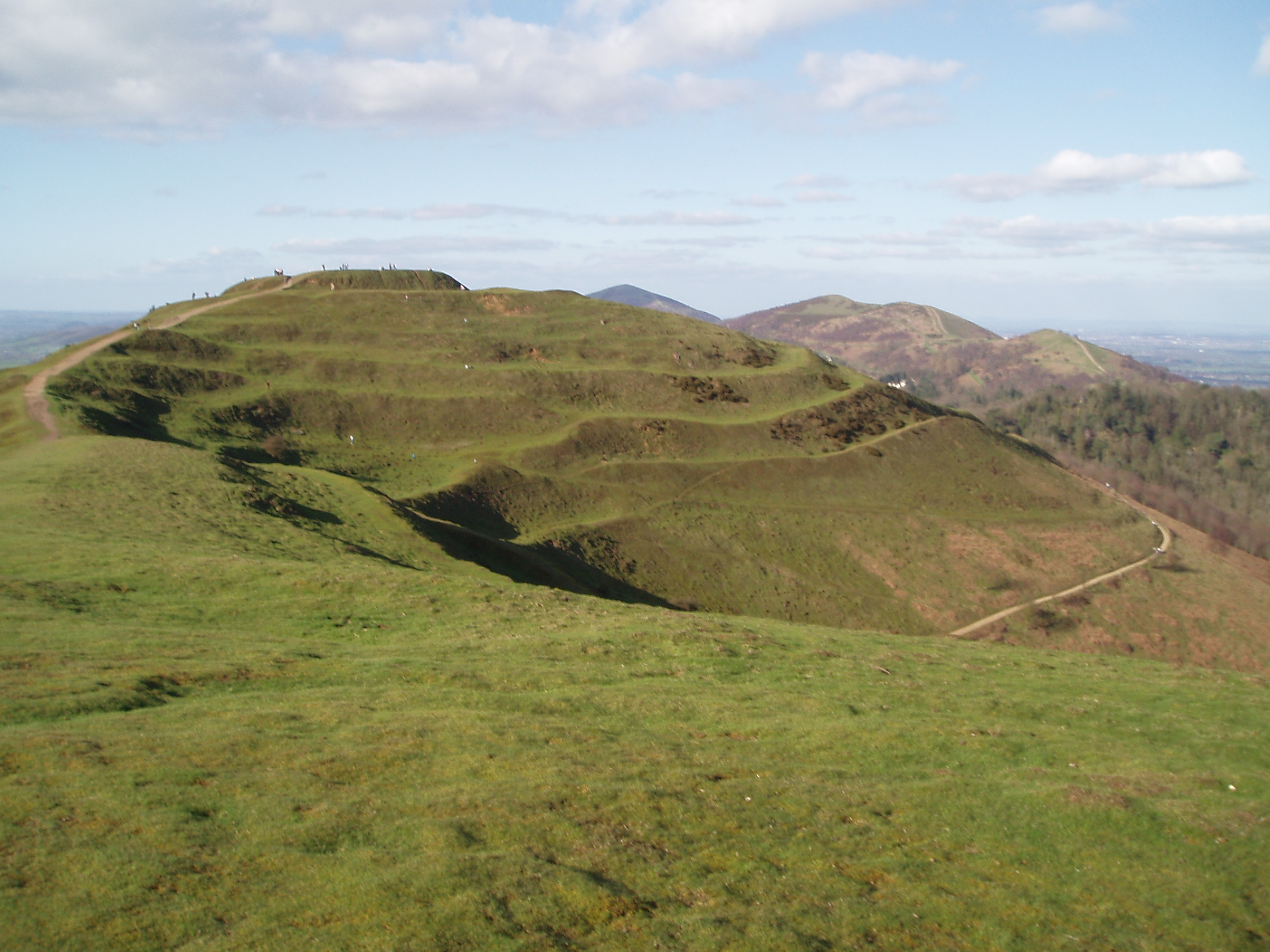
Iron Age earthworks, British Camp

Flint axes, arrowheads, and flakes found in the area are attributed to early Bronze Age settlers, and the "Shire Ditch", a late Bronze Age boundary earthwork possibly dating from around 1000 BC, was constructed along part of the crest of the hills near the site of later settlements. The Wyche Cutting, a pass through the hills, was in use in prehistoric times as part of the salt route from the town of Droitwich Spa to South Wales. A 19th-century discovery of over two hundred metal money bars suggests that the area had been inhabited by the La Tène people around 250 BC. Ancient folklore has it that the British Iron Age chieftain Caratacus made his last stand against the Romans at the British Camp, a site of extensive Iron Age earthworks on a summit of the Malvern Hills close to where Malvern was to be later established. The story remains disputed, however, as Roman historian Tacitus implies a site closer to the river Severn. There is therefore no evidence that Roman presence ended the prehistoric settlement at British Camp. However, excavations at nearby Midsummer Hill fort, Bredon Hill, and Croft Ambrey all show evidence of violent destruction around the year 48 AD. This may suggest that the British Camp was abandoned or destroyed around the same time.

A study made by Royal Commission in 2005 that includes aerial photographs of the Hills "amply demonstrates the archaeological potential of this largely neglected landscape, and provides food for thought for a number of research projects". A pottery industry based on the Malverns left remains dating from the Late Bronze Age to the Norman Conquest, shown by methods of archaeological petrology. Via the River Severn, products were traded as far as South Wales. The Longdon and other marshes at the foot of Malvern Chase were grazed by cattle. "Woodland management was considerable", providing fuel for the kilns.

=== Monastic Malvern ===
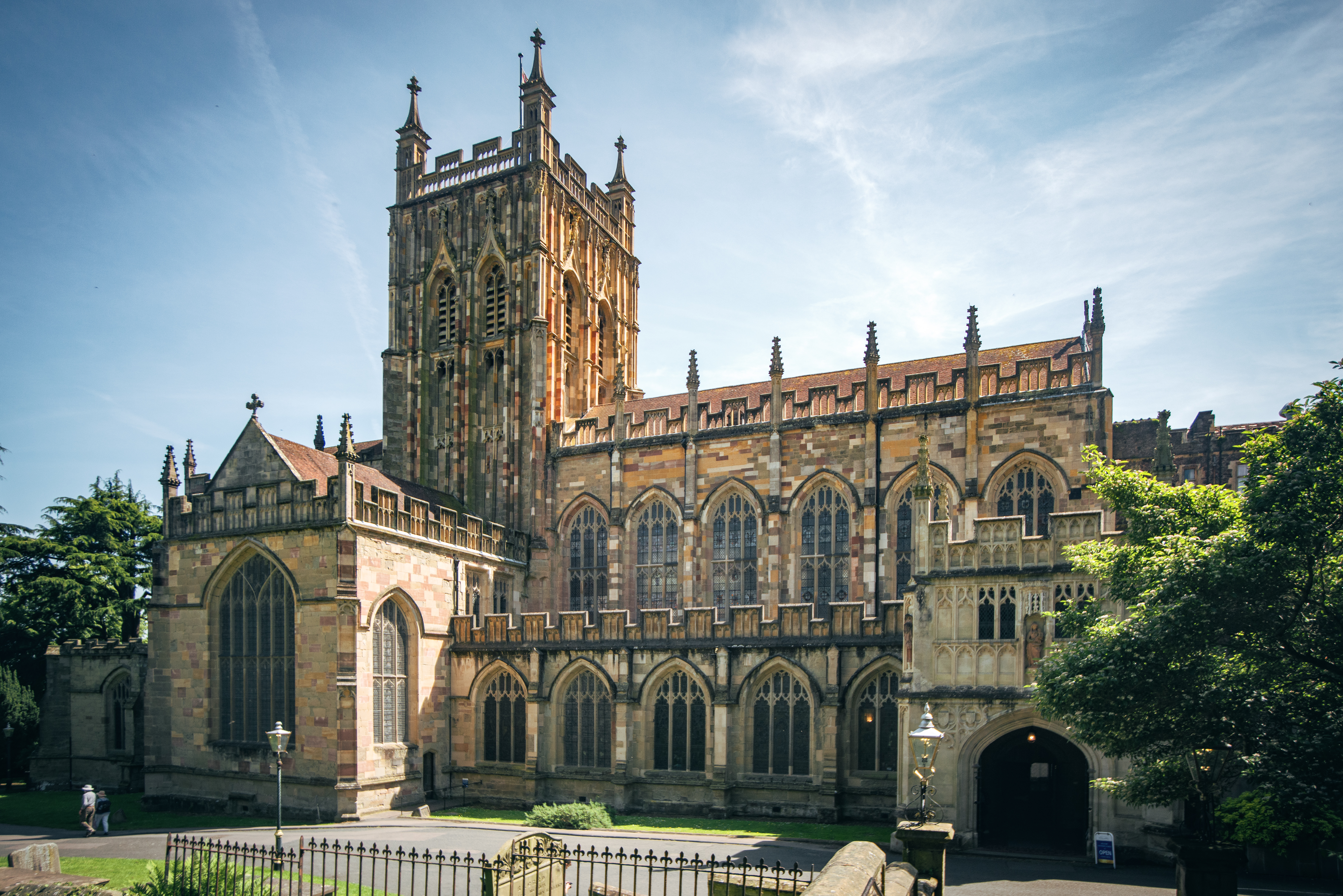
Great Malvern Priory

Little is known about Malvern over the next thousand years until it is described as "an hermitage, or some kind of religious house, for seculars, before the conquest, endowed by the gift of Edward the Confessor". The additions to William Dugdale's Monasticon include an extract from the Pleas taken before the King at York in 1387, stating that there was a congregation of hermits at Malvern "some time before the conquest". Although a Malvern priory existed before the Norman Conquest, it is the settlement of nearby Little Malvern, the site of another, smaller priory, that is mentioned in the Domesday Book. A motte-and-bailey castle built on the top tier of the earthworks of the British Camp just before the Norman Conquest was probably founded by the Saxon Earl Harold Godwinson of Hereford. It was destroyed by King Henry II in 1155.

The town developed around its 11th-century priory, a Benedictine monastery, of which only the large parish church and the abbey gateway remain. Several slightly different histories explain the actual founding of the religious community. Legend tells that the settlement began following the murder of St. Werstan, a monk of Deerhurst, who fled from the Danes and took refuge in the woods of Malvern, where the hermitage had been established. St Werstan's oratory is thought to have been on the site of a Chapel dedicated to the archangel St Michael's, which is believed to have stood on the site of Bello Sguardo, a Victorian villa, which was built on the site of Hermitage Cottage. The cottage was demolished in 1825 and religios carvings were found in it, along with a mediaeval undercroft, human bones, and parts of a coffin. Although the legend may be monastic mythology, historians have however concluded that St. Werstan was the original martyr.

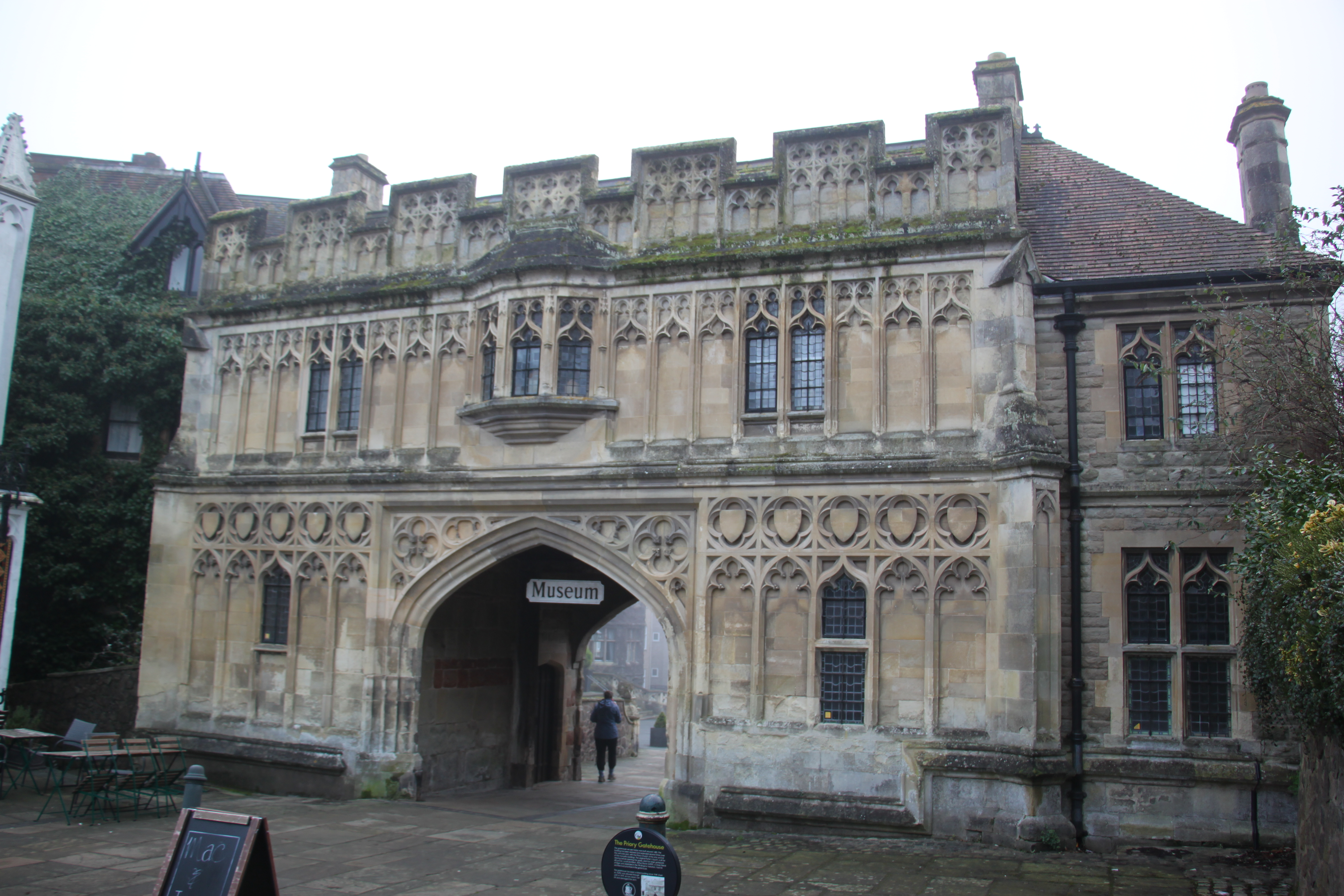
The Abbey Gateway in the town centre is now the home of the Malvern Museum

The first prior, Aldwyn of Malvern, founded the monastery on his bishop's advice, and by 1135 the monastery included thirty monks. Aldwyn was succeeded by Walcher of Malvern, an astronomer and philosopher from the Duchy of Lorraine in France, whose gravestone inside the priory church records details that the priory arose in 1085 from a hermitage endowed by Edward the Confessor. An ancient stained glass window in the Priory church depicts the legend of St. Werstan, with details of his vision, the consecration of his chapel, Edward the Confessor granting the charter for the site, and Werstan's martyrdom.

An 18th-century document states that in the 18th year of the reign of William the Conqueror (probably 1083), a priory was dedicated to St Mary the Virgin. Victoria County History describes how a hermit Aldwyn, who lived in the reign of Edward the Confessor, had petitioned the Earl of Gloucester for the original site (of the Priory) in the wood, and cites his source as "Gervase of Canterbury, Mappa Mundi (Rolls ser.)".

Large estates in Malvern were part of crown lands given to Gilbert "the Red", the seventh Earl of Gloucester and sixth Earl of Hertford, on his marriage to Joan of Acre the daughter of Edward I, in 1290. Disputed hunting rights on these led to several armed conflicts with Humphrey de Bohun, 3rd Earl of Hereford that Edward resolved. Nott states that Gilbert made gifts to the Priory, and describes his "great conflict" with Thomas de Cantilupe, Bishop of Hereford, also about hunting rights and a ditch that Gilbert dug, that was settled by costly litigation. Gilbert had a similar conflict with Godfrey Giffard, Bishop and Administrator of Worcester Cathedral (and formerly Chancellor of England). Godfrey, who had granted land to the Priory, had jurisdictional disputes about Malvern Priory, resolved by Robert Burnell, the current Chancellor.

A discussion in 2005 about the stained glass windows of the Priory Church in terms of the relationship between Church and Laity stresses the importance of Malvern in the development of stained glass. It refers to "the vast and strategically important estates of which Malvern was a part" in the 15th and 16th centuries, to a widespread awareness of Malvern Prior], to the likelihood of a pilgrimage route through the town. The discussion also mentions Thomas Walsingham's view that Malvern was a hiding place of the Lollardy knight Sir John Oldcastle in 1414. Chambers wrote, in relation to the stained glass, "the situation of Malvern was so much admired by Henry VII, his queen (Elizabeth of York) and their two sons, Prince Arthur, and Prince Henry" that they made substantial endowments.

As a royal forest, the area and the surrounding chase were subject to forest law. By Tudor times, royal lands had become used as common land and forest law had fallen into disuse.

=== Post dissolution ===
During the dissolution of the monasteries the local commissioners were instructed to ensure that abbey churches used for parish worship, should continue or could be purchased by parishioners. Malvern Priory was thus acquired by a William Pinnocke and with it, much of the 15th century stained glass windows. The monastic buildings were taken apart and anything usable was sold off. With the exception of the church building (of which the south transept adjoining the monastery's cloisters was destroyed), all that remains of Malvern's monastery is the Abbey Gateway (also known as the Priory Gatehouse) that houses today's Malvern Museum.Erroneously referred to as the Abbey Gateway, the Priory Gatehouse was built in the late 15th century, and is the second oldest building in Great Malvern after the Norman Priory Church.

The contemporary antiquary John Leland described the Malvern Hills and Hanley Castle. An Elizabethan land grant of 1558 mentions Holy Well. A Crown grant of tithes in 1589 mentions lambs, pigs, calves, eggs, hemp and flax. Elizabeth made her Chancellor, Sir Thomas Bromley, the lord of the manor.

King Charles I attempted to enclose and sell two thirds of the Chase, as part of a wider attempt to raise revenue for the Crown from the sale of royal forests. The attempts to enclose the lands, used as commons, resulted in riots, part of a pattern of disturbances that ran across the disafforested royal lands. In 1633, the Court of Exchequer Chamber decreed the rights of the public to two thirds of the lands on the Malvern Hills, and rights of Sir Cornelius Vermuyden and his descendants, and the Crown, to one third (quoted in the preamble to the Malvern Hills Act of 1884). By that time, Malvern had become an established community and the major settlement in the Malvern Chase.

=== Development as a spa (17th–19th centuries) ===
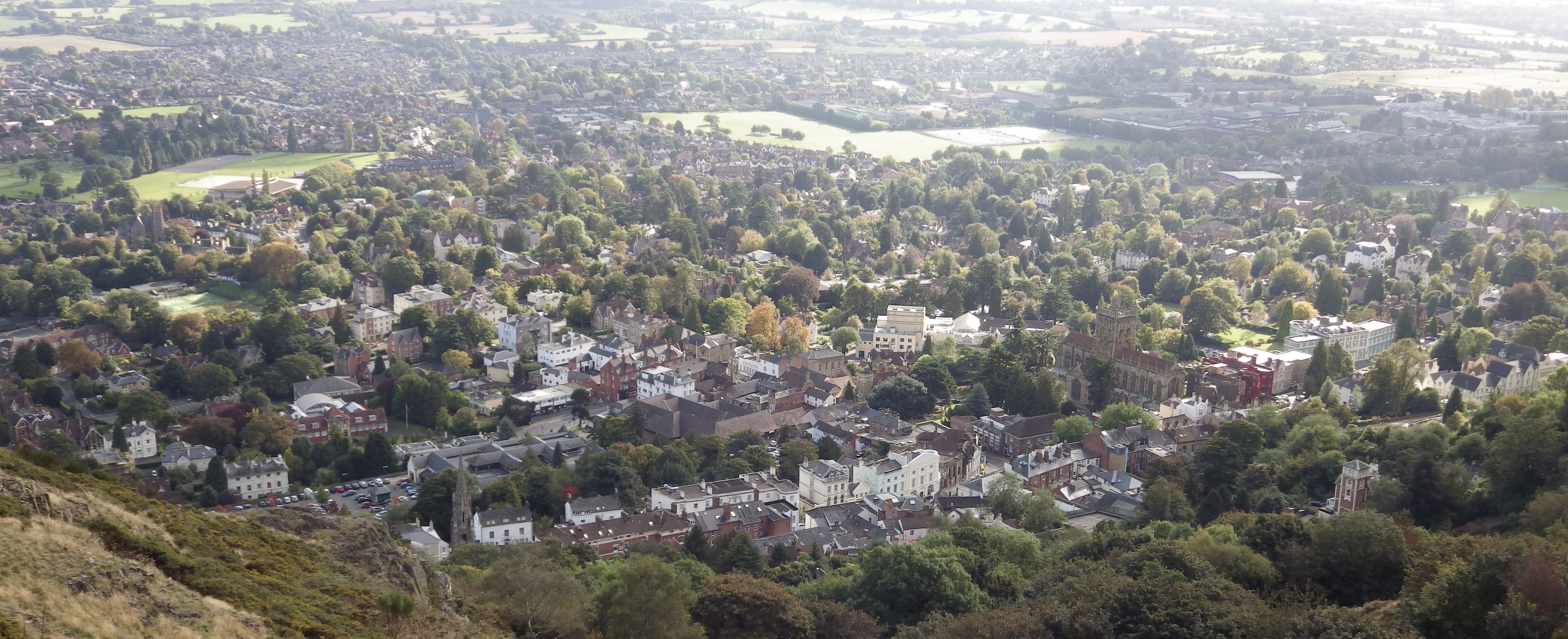
The spa town of Great Malvern was laid out and developed largely during the 19th century

The purported health-giving properties of Malvern water and the natural beauty of the surroundings led to the development of Malvern as a spa, with resources for invalids for tourists. According to legend, the curative benefit of the spring water was known in mediaeval times. The medicinal value and the bottling of Malvern water are mentioned "in a poem attributed to the Reverend Edmund Rea, who became Vicar of Great Malvern in 1612". The occulist Richard Banister wrote about the Eye Well, close to the Holy Well, in a short poem in his Breviary of the Eyes (see Malvern water), in 1622. In 1756, Dr. John Wall published a 14-page pamphlet on the benefits of Malvern water, that reached a 158-page 3rd edition in 1763. Further praise came from the botanist Benjamin Stillingfleet in 1757, the poet Thomas Warton in 1790, and William Addison, the physician of the Duchess of Kent (mother of Queen Victoria) in 1828, all quoted in a review by the medical historian W. H. McMenemy. In his lecture about Malvern at the Royal Institution, Addison spoke of "its pure and invigorating air, the excellence of its water, and the romantic beauty of its scenery". Similar views appeared in the press, Nicholas Vansittart brought his wife Catherine to Malvern for a rest cure in 1809. Chambers, in his book about Malvern, praised Elizabeth, Countess Harcourt (daughter-in-law of the 1st Earl Harcourt), whose patronage contributed to the development of hillside walks.

Bottling and shipping of the Malvern water grew in volume. In 1842, Dr. James Wilson and Dr. James Manby Gully, leading exponents of hydrotherapy, set up clinics in Malvern (Holyrood House for women and Tudor House for men). Malvern expanded rapidly as a residential spa. Several large hotels and many of the large villas date from its heyday. Many smaller hotels and guest houses were built between about 1842 and 1875. By 1855 there were already 95 hotels and boarding houses and by 1865 over a quarter of the town's 800 houses were hospitality venues. Most were in Great Malvern, the town centre, while others were in the surrounding local settlements.

Queen Adelaide visited St. Ann's Well in September 1842. "Throughout the 1840s and 1850s Malvern attracted a stream of celebrated visitors, including royalty." Patients included Charles Darwin, Catherine, wife of Charles Dickens, Thomas Carlyle, Florence Nightingale, Lord Lytton, who was an outspoken advocate of the waters, Lord Tennyson and Samuel Wilberforce.

The extension of the railway from Worcester to Malvern Link was completed on 25 May 1859. The following year, "Besides middle class visitors ... the railway also brought working class excursionists from the Black Country with dramatic effect ... At Whitsuntide ... 10,000 came from the Black Country to the newly opened stations at Great Malvern and Malvern Wells. Throughout June to September, day trips were frequent, causing the "town to be crowded with 'the most curious specimens of the British shopkeeper and artisan on an outing'."

Following Malvern's new-found fame as a spa and area of natural beauty, and fully exploiting its new rail connections, factories from as far as Manchester were organising day trips for their employees, often attracting as many as 5,000 visitors a day. In 1865, a public meeting of residents denounced the rising rail fares – by then twice that of other lines – that were exploiting the tourism industry, and demanded a limitation to the number of excursion trains. The arrival of the railway also enabled the delivery of coal in large quantities, which accelerated the area's popularity as a winter resort.

The 1887 Baedeker's includes Malvern in a London–Worcester–Hereford itinerary and described as "an inland health resort, famous for its bracing air and pleasant situation" and "a great educational centre", with five hotels that are "well spoken of", a commercial hotel, the Assembly Rooms and Gardens, and many excursions on foot, pony and by carriage. Other descriptions of the diversions mention bands, quadrilles, cricket (residents vs visitors) and billiard rooms. The Duchess of Teck stayed, with her daughter Mary (later queen consort of George V), in Malvern in the autumn of 1891, joined by Lady Eva Greville and the Duke of Teck. The Duchess was "perfectly enchanted with Malvern and its surroundings" and, with the duke, visited Malvern College. The duchess returned to open the new waterworks at Camp Hill in 1895. In 1897, the painter Edward Burne-Jones came to Malvern for the "bracing air", on the recommendation of his doctor, but stayed in his hotel for a week. The 7-year-old Franklin D. Roosevelt visited in 1889, during a trip to Europe with his parents.

By 1875 encroachment on Malvern's wastelands by landowners had reached new heights and action was taken by the people of Malvern and the Commons Society to preserve the hills and common land and to prevent encroachment. Local lords of the manor indicated that they would like to give their rights to the wastes to the public. After preventing the enclosure of a common in 1882, negotiations were initiated with the owners of the northern hills and the first Malvern Hills Act was secured in parliament in 1884. Later Acts empowered the Malvern Hills Conservators to acquire land to prevent further encroachment on common land and by 1925 they had bought much of the manorial wastelands.

Towards the end of the 19th century, the popularity of the hydrotherapy had declined to the extent that many hotels were already being converted into private boarding schools and rest homes, and education became the basis of Malvern's economy. By 1865, the town already had 17 single-gender private schools, increasing to 25 by 1885. The area was well suited for schools due to its established attractive environment and access by rail. Children could travel unaccompanied with their trunks by rail to their boarding schools near the stations in Great Malvern, Malvern Wells, and Malvern Link. Malvern St James (formerly Malvern Girls College), in a former hotel, opposite Great Malvern railway station, has a tunnel (now derelict) to the basement of the building, which is visible from both platforms of the station.

=== 20th and 21st centuries ===
Malvern began to develop into a modern town in the early 1900s, with a continuing strong agricultural presence. Modernisation continued, and the World War II years transformed and increased the population and its activities, establishing the town in 1942 as a centre of defence and scientific research. Liquid-crystal displays were developed in 1972 in conjunction with the Royal Radar Establishment, where Geoffrey Dummer invented the idea of the integrated circuit in 1952.

In the 1960s, the M5 motorway was built with accesses near Malvern, by-passing Worcester city centre, providing direct routes to the areas of Birmingham and Bristol bringing them into commuter distance. Modern manufacturing and service industries were established in Spring Lane Industrial Estate that was developed in the 1960s and the adjoining Enigma Business Park that was built in the 1990s. The early 21st century saw further investment in the arts emphasising the town's status as a regional centre for music and theatre.

== Governance ==
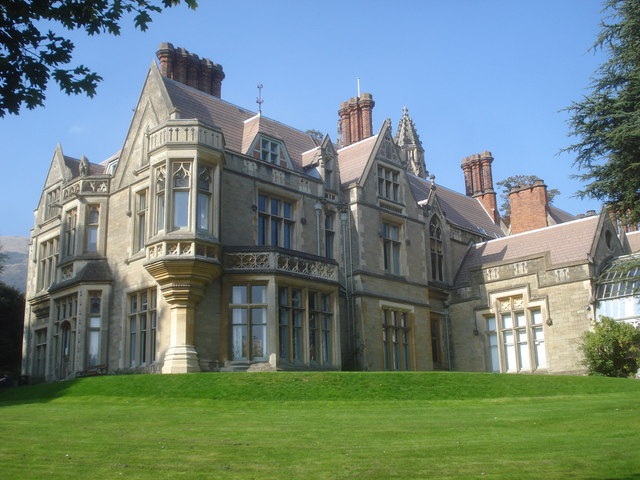
Council House (built 1874), viewed from Priory Park, is the headquarters of the District Council.

Malvern is a town and civil parish governed at the lowest tier of local government by Malvern Town Council, at district level by the Malvern Hills District and at county level by Worcestershire County Council.

=== Malvern Town Council ===
At the lowest tier of local government, the town council was legally constituted in 1996 and covers the area of Malvern civil parish. Since the boundary reform of 2023 Malvern Town Council has nine newly named electoral wards: Chase (4), Great Malvern, Link (4), Lygon (1), Pickersleigh (2), Pound Bank (1), St Joseph (1), Upper Howsell (2), and West (2). The new wards wards are represented by a total of 20 elected councillors (in parentheses) and are based on the distribution of the population and some ignore the names of the neighbourhoods or suburbs they contain, and use loaned names.

=== Malvern Hills District ===
Malvern Hills District comprises 68 civil parishes and 22 electoral wards. The ward boundaries were redefined from the wards of the former Malvern Urban District Council (1900–1974), and again in 2023. Through the many changes in local government since the beginning of the 20th century, the importance and distinction of the local boundaries of the historical areas of Great Malvern, Malvern Link, North Malvern, Cowleigh, and other neighbourhoods, have been much diminished while some place names have been used for electoral wards of Malvern Town Council.

=== Historical ===
The original parish of Great Malvern included the hamlet of Guarlford and the chapelry of Newland, and stretched from the River Severn on the east to the Malvern Hills on the west. Guarlford became a separate civil parish in 1894 when, under the Local Government Act 1894, urban district councils were created for Malvern and Malvern Link. The Guarlford parish covered much of eastern Malvern, including parts of Great Malvern, Pickersleigh, Poolbrook, Barnards Green, Hall Green and Sherrard's Green. By 1900 however, the urban districts of Malvern and Malvern Link amalgamated, absorbing parts of neighbouring parishes to create a town of six wards under the Malvern Urban District Council. In 1934 the boundaries changed again, and those areas came under the control of the Malvern council.

== Geography ==
=== Town centre ===
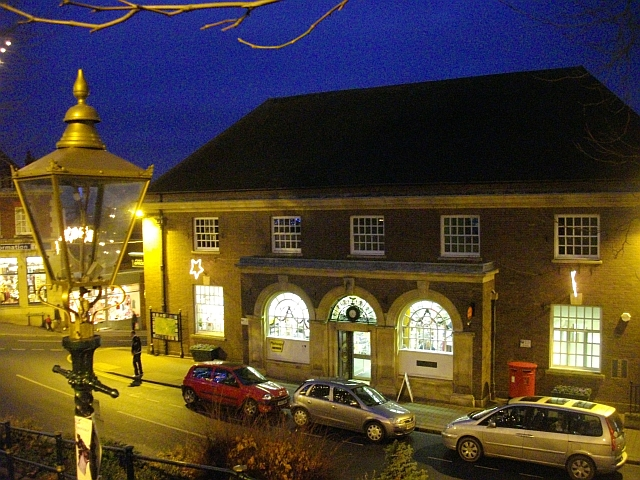
Malvern post office, town centre

The town centre comprises two main streets at right angles to each other: the steep Church Street and Bellevue Terrace, a relatively flat north–south extension of the A449 road which forms Malvern's western extremity along the flank of the hills. Among the many shops are two large modern supermarkets, both in Edith Walk, formerly a steep and unmade lane that served the rear entrances of the shops in Church Street. Many of the traditional high street shops such as butchers, bakers, grocers etc., are now health food shops, art and craft shops, charity shops, law firms, and estate agents.

The offices of Malvern Town Council, the Malvern Hills Conservators, The Malvern Hills AONB Partnership, and Malvern Hills District Council are in the town centre. The town's amenities include the Malvern Theatres complex, the Priory Park, the Splash leisure and swimming complex, the main library, the police station, the tourist information centre, and the Malvern Museum. In the heart of the town is a statue of the composer Edward Elgar, while other statuary such as The Malvhina Fountain a sculpture by artist Rose Garrard is dedicated to Malvern water.

Great Malvern railway station, a listed example of classical Victorian railway architecture, is close to the nearby former Imperial Hotel by the same architect, E. W. Elmslie.

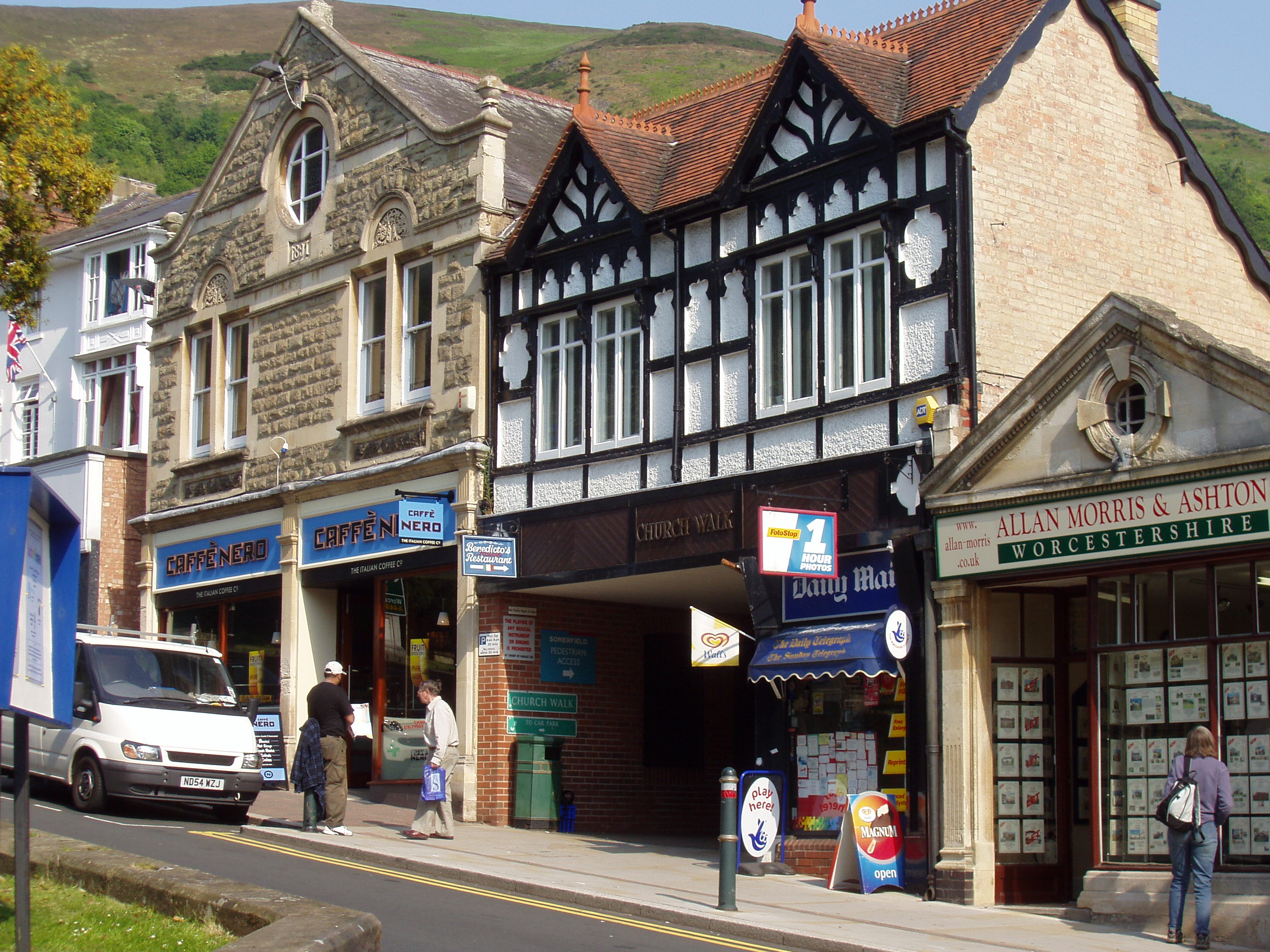
Detail of buildings and shops in Church Street, Great Malvern

=== Climate ===
Malvern lies in the lower Severn/Avon plain affording it a degree of shelter caused by virtue of its nestling in between the Cotswold hills to the east, the Welsh hills and mountains to the west, and Birmingham plateau to the north. Although as with all the British Isles it has a maritime climate, the local topography means summer warmth can become emphasised by a slight effect of Foehn wind off the surrounding hills. The record maximum stands at 35.8 °C (96.4 °F) set in August 1990. Typically 17.3 days of the year will reach 25.1 °C (77.2 °F) or higher and the annual warmest day should reach 29.8 °C (85.6 °F) according to the 1971–00 observing period.

Winter temperature inversions can also occur given the correct conditions allowing very low minima to occur. Nonetheless, on average the region is one of the warmest non-coastal areas in the UK, with overall night time minima in particular rivalling more urban areas. Indeed, despite the notable low absolute minima (several weather-observing sites nearby having fallen below −20 °C (−4 °F) in the past) the annual average frost ratio is a mere 33 days per year (1971–00), actually lower than more urbanised weather station locations such as London's Heathrow Airport. An absolute minimum of −19.5 °C (−3.1 °F) was set during the record cold month December 2010. Before this, the coldest nights were recorded in the winter of 1981/82; −18.1 °C (−0.6 °F) in December 1981, −18.0 °C (−0.4 °F) in January 1982.

The sunniest year was 2003, when 1776 hours of sunshine were recorded. Rainfall averages around 740 millimetres (29 in) per year, with over 1 mm being recorded on 123 days of the year. Snowfall is highly variable. When winter low pressure systems move from south-west to north-east the Malvern area is often on the northern flank, meaning heavy snowfall while areas further south and east receive rain or no precipitation at all. However, when snowfall arrives by means of convective showers driven by northerly, north–westerly or north–easterly winds the area tends to be one of the least snowy parts of the UK, owing to its sheltered positioning.

Climate data for Malvern, elevation 62m, 1971–2000, Sunshine 1961–90
Month	Jan	Feb	Mar	Apr	May	Jun	Jul	Aug	Sep	Oct	Nov	Dec	Year
Mean daily maximum °C (°F)	7.3 (45.1)	7.8 (46.0)	10.5 (50.9)	13.2 (55.8)	17.1 (62.8)	19.8 (67.6)	22.4 (72.3)	21.8 (71.2)	18.4 (65.1)	14.2 (57.6)	10.1 (50.2)	8.1 (46.6)	14.3 (57.7)
Mean daily minimum °C (°F)	1.9 (35.4)	1.8 (35.2)	3.5 (38.3)	4.9 (40.8)	7.6 (45.7)	10.5 (50.9)	12.8 (55.0)	12.5 (54.5)	10.3 (50.5)	7.3 (45.1)	4.2 (39.6)	2.7 (36.9)	6.7 (44.1)
Average precipitation mm (inches)	74.95 (2.95)	55.33 (2.18)	55.54 (2.19)	54.51 (2.15)	52.59 (2.07)	60.20 (2.37)	43.26 (1.70)	60.07 (2.36)	68.94 (2.71)	68.74 (2.71)	65.76 (2.59)	79.09 (3.11)	738.99 (29.09)
Mean monthly sunshine hours	50	61	107	139	178	185	191	173	134	91	62	45	1,416
Source: Royal Netherlands Meteorological Institute (RNMI)

== Demography ==
At the 2021 census, Malvern had an older, predominantly White British population. The civil parish of Malvern that includes the neighbouring urban settlements of West Malvern, Malvern Wells, Little Malvern and Newland had a population of 30,462 and covers 19.90 km². 51.6% females, there were 48.4% males. 92.5% were born in the UK. The average household size was 2.4. 18.3% of the population were under the age of 18 and 54.6% were aged 18 to 64, and 27.1% over 65. The 2021 census found the White British ethnic group to be by far the largest in Malvern with 95.2% identifying as such. The next largest ethnic group was White Other, which accounted for 3.2% of the population, followed by the Asian, 642 people, and Mixed Race categories 546 people, with a Black ethnic group of 151 people and the other group constituted 96 of the population.

=== Population development ===
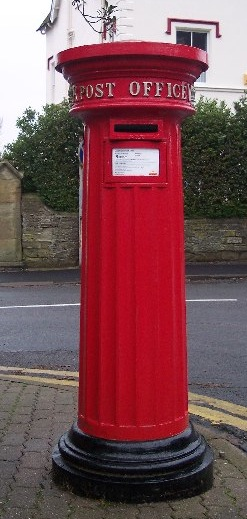
Victorian pillar box on the corner of Priory Road and Orchard Road

The area remained a village and cluster of manors and farms until "taking of the water" in Malvern became popularised by Dr. Wall in 1756. By the 1820s the Baths and the Pump Room were opened; in 1842 Drs. James Wilson and James Manby Gully opened up water cure establishments in the town centre. By the middle of the 19th century, with the arrival of the railway, bath houses and other establishments catering for the health tourists flourished. By the early 20th century Malvern had developed from a small village centred on its priory to a town with many large hotels and Victorian and Edwardian era country villas. Malvern's population grew in 1942 when the Telecommunications Research Establishment (TRE) moved to Malvern, bringing 2,500 employees, increasing to around 3,500 by 1945.

In the early 1950s, several large housing estates were built in Malvern by the government to provide accommodation for the staff and their families. A significant proportion of the current population of Malvern are present and former employees of the facility (now called QinetiQ), and its previously attached military contingent from engineering (REME) and other units of all three British armed forces. Malvern had already become an overspill for the nearby city of Worcester, and the new motorways constructed in the early 1960s brought the industrial Midlands within commuting distance by car. With this development came the construction of large private housing developments. The town continues to swell as increasingly more farmland, especially in the Malvern Link area between the villages of Guarlford and Newland, is turned over to housing projects creating new communities and suburbs.

Year	Population	Notes
1563	105 families	Probably what is now the town centre area with nearby farms and manors.
1741	had sixty houses	Probably what is now the town centre area.
1801	819	Taken from British spas from 1815 to the present
1819	2,768	1819 census – probably what is now the town centre area (Great Malvern).
1851	3,771	Probably including the former ecclesiastical parishes of Guarlford and Newland, and the settlement of Poolbrook.
1861	6,049	Taken from A History of Malvern
1881	13,216	Taken from A History of Malvern
1911	16,514	Reflects the 1900 merging of the Malvern and Malvern Link urban district councils.
1951	21,681	Taken from A History of Malvern
1961	24,373	Taken from A History of Malvern
2001	28,749	Civil parish.
2011	29,626	Civil parish. Census 2011
2021	30,462	Census 2021.

== Economy ==
=== Research and development ===
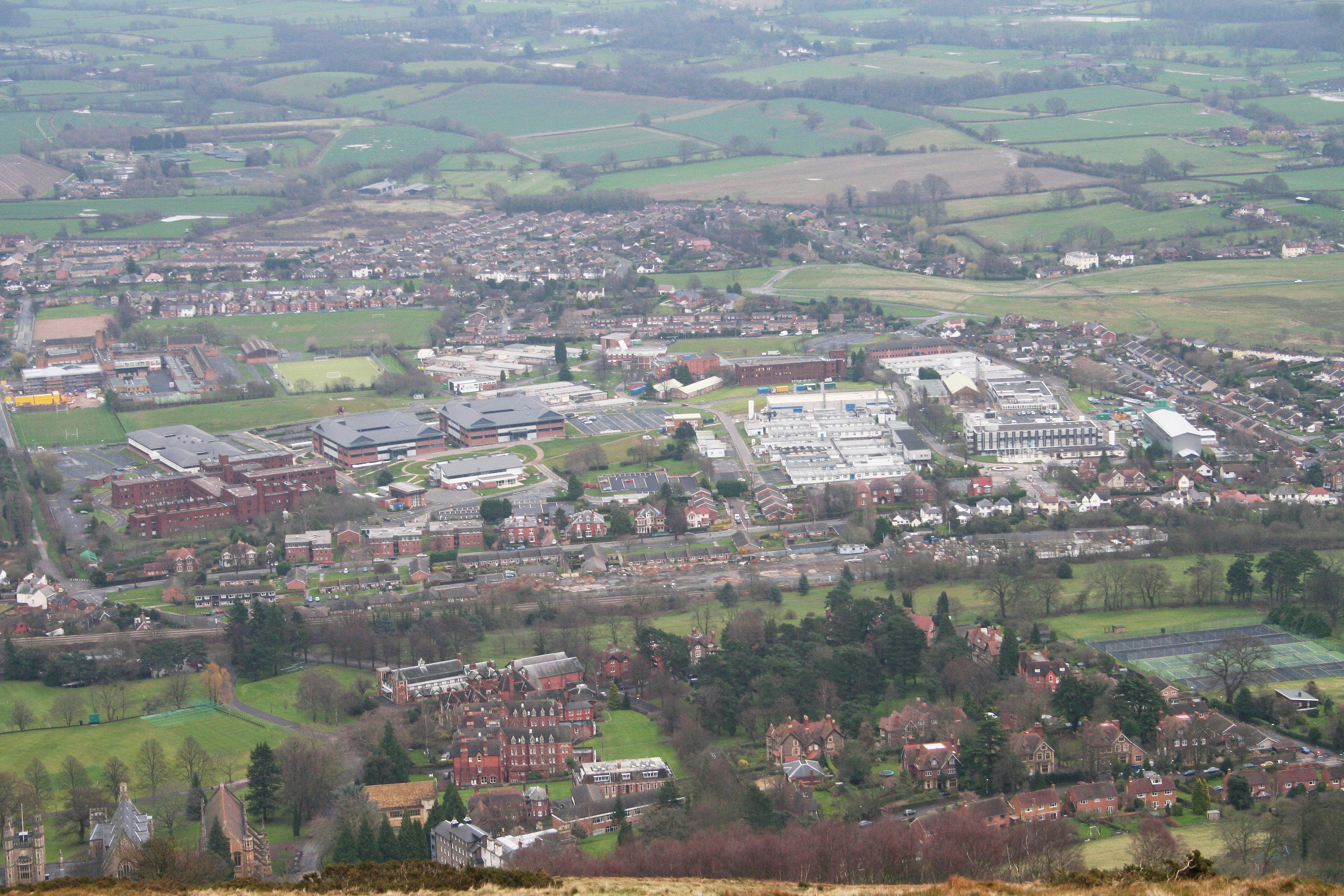
View of the QinetiQ facility from the Malvern Hills. Malvern College campus in the foreground, and the village of Poolbrook to the rear

Since 1942, research and development into defence physics and electronics has been the major source of employment in Malvern, when, during World War II, the Telecommunications Research Establishment (TRE) moved there from Worth Matravers on the south coast, for safety from enemy action. The Radar Research and Development Establishment (RRDE) was moved to Malvern at the same time. Initially, TRE was housed at Malvern College.

TRE was the main United Kingdom research and development organization for radio navigation, radar, infrared detection for heat-seeking missiles, and related work for the Royal Air Force (RAF), during World War II and the years that followed. It was regarded as "the most brilliant and successful of the English wartime research establishments" under "[Albert] Rowe, who saw more of the English scientific choices between 1935 and 1945 than any single man". TRE and RRDE merged in 1953 to form the Radar Research Establishment (RRE), which was further renamed to Royal Radar Establishment (also RRE) in 1955. In 2001, the facility was partly transferred from governmental ownership to private ownership, and became QinetiQ. The Defence Science and Technology Laboratory (DSTL) has since closed down, with the remaining staff moving to other DSTL sites.

With the recognised science and technology developments in the Malvern area, Malvern Hills Science Park was built in 1999, and is now home to over 30 science and technological businesses, including, UTC Aerospace Systems (formerly Goodrich Corporation), and Textlocal. By 2020 most of the remaining historic scientific research buildings on the southern part of the Qinetq campus had been demolished and the land sold off for development of a large housing estate and a care home.

=== Manufacturing ===
Other manufacturing and service industries are mainly grouped in the Spring Lane Industrial Estate that was developed in the 1960s and the adjoining Enigma Business Park that was begun in the 1990s.

Pipe organs have been built in Malvern since 1841 by Nicholson Organs. Nicholson organs can be found in Gloucester and Portsmouth Cathedrals, and Great Malvern Priory. Cars have been constructed in Malvern since 1894 by Santler (Britain's first petrol car) and 1910 by the Morgan Motor Company, one of the world's longest-existing private constructors of automobiles produced in series. Morgan cars are traditional roadsters that over the years have become 'cult' vehicles, exported worldwide from the factory in Malvern Link. Specialist glass tubing and microscope slides are produced by Chance Brothers in their factory in Malvern next door to the Morgan Motor works.

=== Agriculture and horticulture ===
Malvern is a centre for agricultural industry. The 70-acre (280,000 m^{2}) Three Counties Showground, operated by the Three Counties Agricultural Society, is a few miles to the south of Malvern on the road to Upton upon Severn. It has been the permanent venue for the Royal Three Counties Show, held each year in June, since 1958. Representing the counties of Worcestershire, Herefordshire and Gloucestershire, it is one of the most important agricultural shows in the UK, and can be traced back to 1797. It attracts an average of 93,000 visitors over its three-day event, and the event almost doubles the town's local population. The showground also hosts the Royal Horticultural Society's Spring Gardening Show, followed by many other events throughout the year including other regular gardening shows. The Lobelia pioneers William Crump and Dr. Brent Elliott worked in Malvern and were awarded the Victoria Medal of Honour of the Royal Horticultural Society. A tea rose was named for the Malvern rose grower Mrs. Foley Hobbs in 1910 (see page 119 of cited work). As well as agricultural and horticultural shows, the showground holds regular antique and flea markets throughout the year. These have become some of the largest in the UK, attracting thousands of visitors each year.

== Culture ==
=== Architecture ===
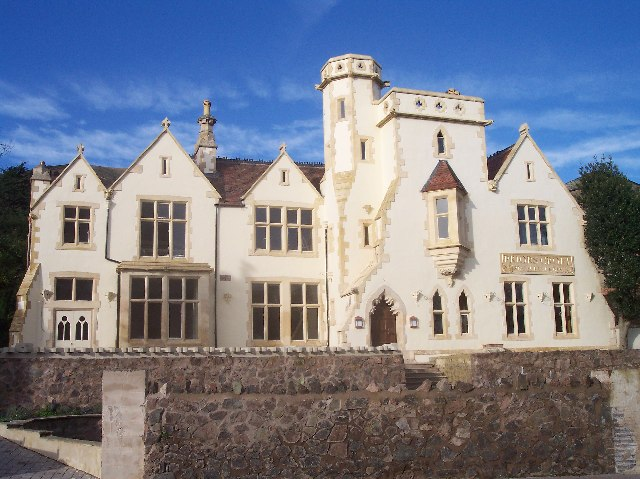
Prior's Croft, Grange Road (Victorian Gothic architecture)

The town centre and its environs contain many examples of Regency, Victorian and Edwardian villas and hotels. Many of the houses were built during the Industrial Revolution and Malvern's boom years as a spa town by wealthy families from the nearby Birmingham area. Following the collapse of the spa industry, many of the hotels and villas became schools, and some have since been further converted to apartments, while some of the smaller hotels are now retirement homes. The Imperial Hotel in red brick with stone dressings, which later became a school, is one of the largest buildings in Malvern. It was built in 1860 by the architect E. W. Elmslie who also designed the Great Malvern railway station, and the Council House on the plot where Dr. Gully's original house stood. The Grove in Avenue Road in 1867, originally to be his private residence in 1927 became part of the Lawnside School for girls, and in 1860 Whitbourne Hall, a Grade II* listed building, in Herefordshire. The Imperial was the first hotel to be lit by incandescent gas. It was equipped with all types of baths, and brine was brought specially by rail from Droitwich.

Much architecture and statuary in the town centre is dedicated to Malvern water, including the St Ann's Well, which is housed in a building dating from 1813.

=== Music ===
Sir Edward Elgar, British composer and Master of the King's Musick, lived much of his life around Malvern. His Pomp and Circumstance, March No. 1, composed in 1901 and to which the words of Land of Hope and Glory were later set, was first performed in the Wyche School next to the church in the presence of Elgar. A sculpture group by artist Rose Garrard comprising the Enigma fountain together with a statue of Elgar gazing over Great Malvern stands on Belle Vue Terrace in the town centre. The Elgar Route, a 40-mile (64 km) drive passing some key landmarks from Elgar's life, passes through Malvern. Malvern Concert Club, founded in 1903 by Elgar, holds concerts held in the Forum Theatre, Malvern Theatres. Its programmes focus on renaissance, baroque, classical, romantic and contemporary music.

The Chandos Symphony Orchestra, under the professional direction of Michael Lloyd, has over 100 players. It specialises in performances of major works of the 19th and 20th Centuries. The Autumn in Malvern Festival is an annual event featuring performances of artists of music, poetry, writers and film makers held during October every year. The Colwell and other brass bands of the early century were part of the music of the town. The British violinist Nigel Kennedy lived in Malvern for many years and gives concerts in the town's culture venue. Julius Harrison (1885–1963), lived in Pickersleigh Road for most of the 1940s and was music director at Malvern College and director of the early Elgar Festivals in Malvern.

In the 1960s, 1970s, and 1980s the Malvern Winter Gardens was a major regional venue drawing an audience from as far afield as Birmingham, Cheltenham, and Gloucester for concerts by popular rock bands, including Dave Berry, The Who, The Spencer Davis Group, T-Rex, The Jam, AC/DC, Cream, Deep Purple, Black Sabbath, Manfred Mann, The Undertones, Joy Division, Procol Harum and many others. Most of the 1960s concerts were staged by Bannister promotions while later events were promoted by Cherry Red, a London-based independent record label formed in 1978.

=== Drama ===
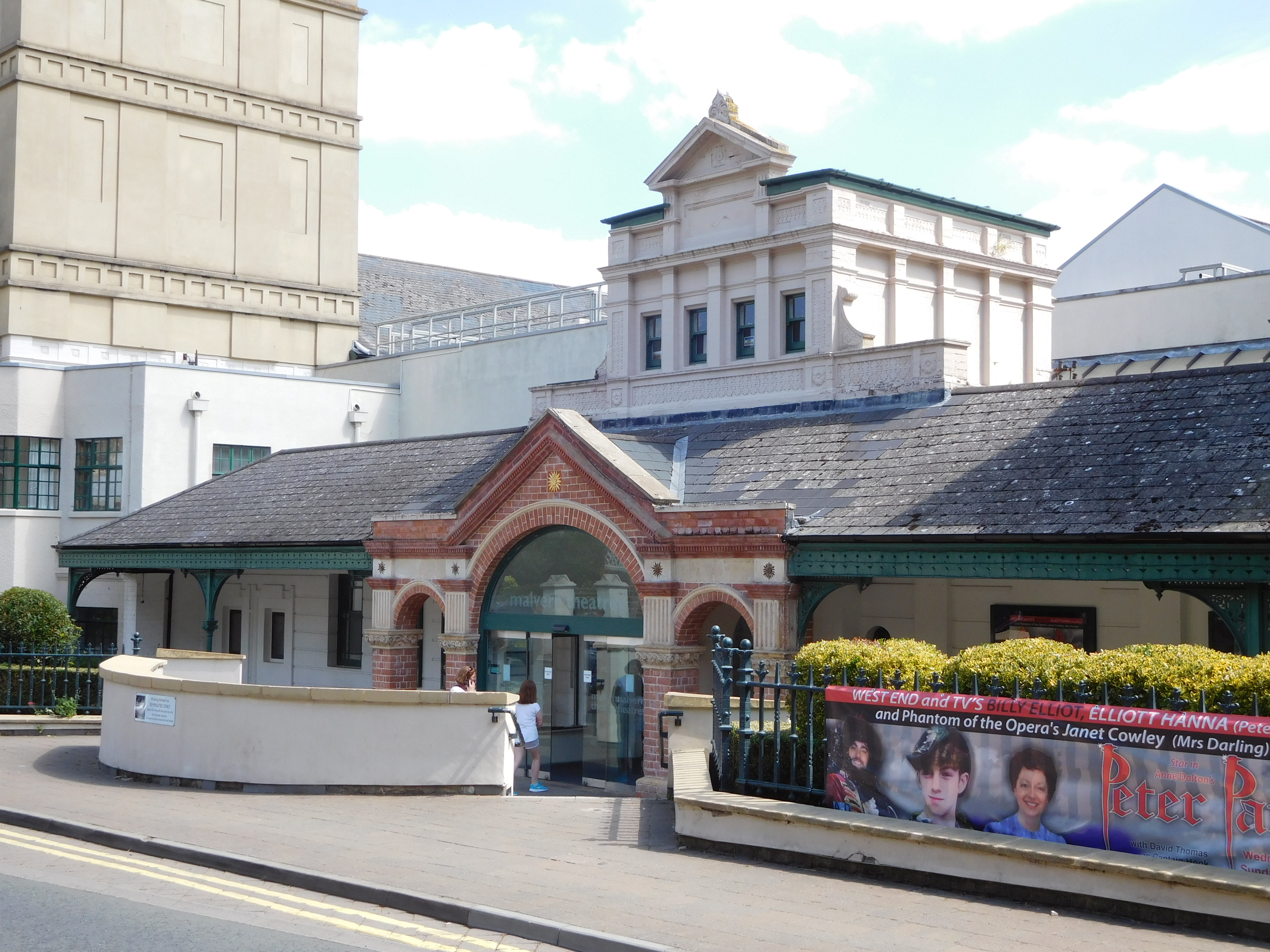
Malvern Theatres pre 2023

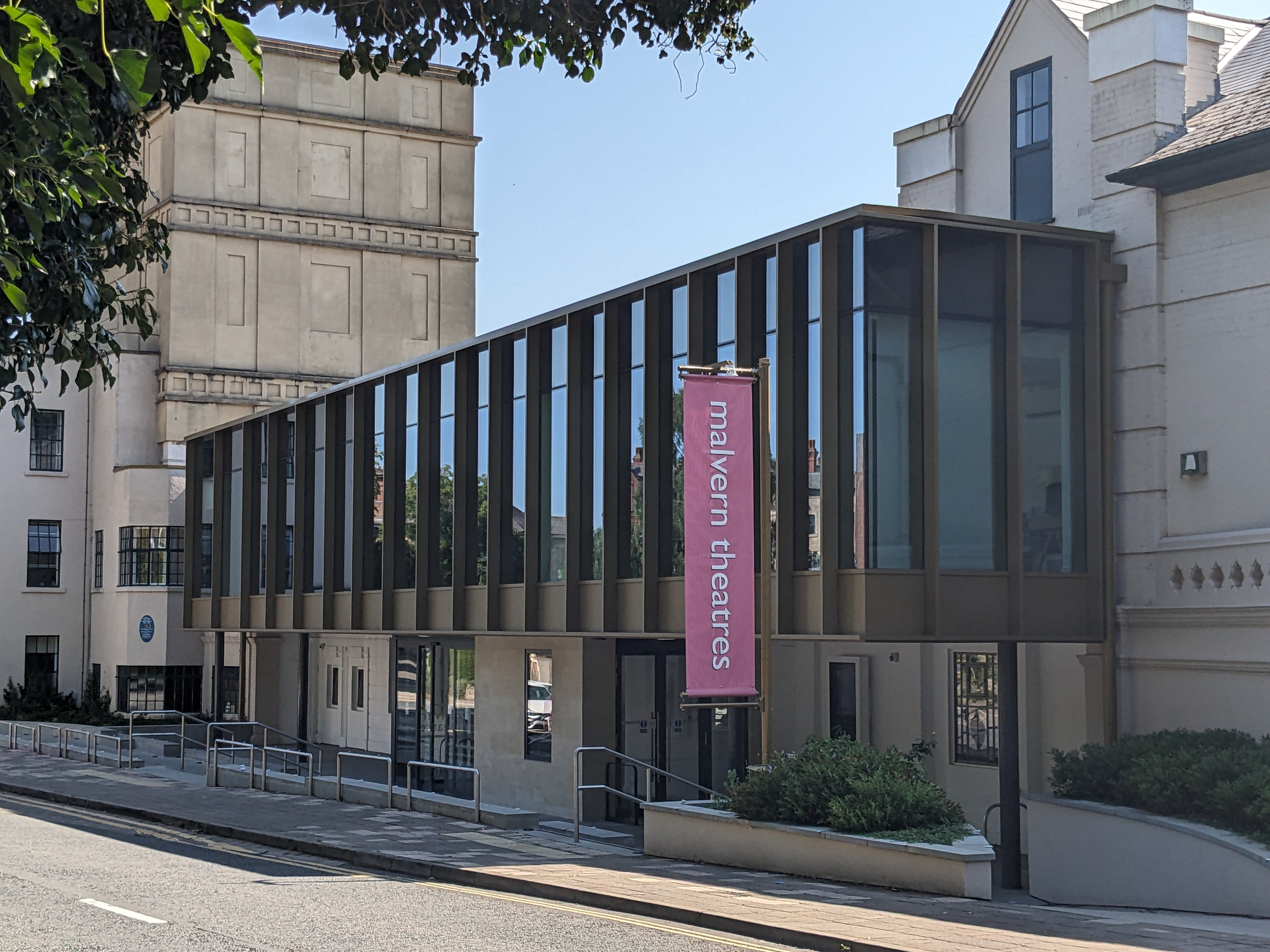
Malvern Theatres entrance 2024

Malvern Theatres, housed in the Winter Gardens complex in the town centre, is a provincial centre for the arts. The first Malvern Drama Festival, which took place in 1929, was dedicated to George Bernard Shaw and planned by Sir Barry Jackson. A number of works have had their first performances at Malvern, six by Shaw including In Good King Charles's Golden Days, the 1929 English première of The Apple Cart, and the world première of Geneva in 1938. In 1956 Malvern held a Shaw centenary week. In February 1965 a Malvern Festival Theatre Trust was set up, and extensive refurbishment was undertaken. J. B. Priestley presided over the opening ceremony of the first summer season. In 1998, a further £7.2 million major redesign and refurbishment took place with the help of contributions from the National Lottery Distribution Fund (NLDF), administered by the government Department for Culture, Media and Sport. As part of a government funded £20 million extension planned for completion in 2026, a £2.25 million extension including a modern frontage was opened in July 2023.

The Theatre of Small Convenience entered the Guinness World Records in 2002 as the smallest theatre in the world. Housed in a former Victorian public convenience in the centre of the town in Edith Walk, the theatre had a capacity of 12 people. Before closing in 2017, the theatre regularly hosted puppetry, professional and amateur actors, drama, poetry, storytelling, and opera.

=== Literature ===
William Langland's famous 14th-century poem The Visions of Piers Plowman (1362) was inspired by the Malvern Hills and the earliest poetic allusion to them occurs in the poem And on a Maye mornynge on Malverne hylles. Langland, the reputed writer, was possibly educated at the priory of Great Malvern. Several roads and buildings in Malvern are named after him.

Malvern entered the writings and lives of several 17th–19th century poets. These include

- Michael Drayton: "While Malvern, king of hills, Severn overlooks", (Poly-Olbion, 1613, song 7),
- John Dyer: "By the blue steeps of distant Malvern wall'd" (The fleece, 1757, about sheep farming),
- Thomas Warton: "Health opes the healing power her chosen fount/ In ... Malvern's ample mount", (1790, Ode on his Majesty's birthday),
- Thomas Gray visited in 1770 during his final travels,
- Joseph Cottle: "As I climb ... One mass of glory ... A fairy vision!" (The Malvern Hills, 1798),
- William Wordsworth: church bells ring as "high as Malvern's cloudy crest" (1835, St. Catherine of Ledbury),
- Patrick Tytler died in Great Malvern, in 1849,
- Lord Macaulay: "Till twelve fair counties saw the blaze on Malvern's lonely height" (The Armada).

C. S. Lewis and J. R. R. Tolkien are among the authors that have frequented Malvern. Legend states that, after drinking in a Malvern pub one winter evening, they were walking home when it started to snow. They saw a lamp post shining out through the snow and Lewis turned to his friends and said "that would make a very nice opening line to a book". The novel The Lion, the Witch and the Wardrobe by Lewis later used that image as the characters enter the realm of Narnia. Tolkien found inspiration in the Malvern landscape which he had viewed from his childhood home in Birmingham and his brother Hilary's home near Evesham. He was introduced to the area by Lewis, who had brought him here to meet George Sayer, the Head of English at Malvern College. Sayer had been a student of Lewis, and became his biographer, and together with them Tolkien would walk the Malvern Hills. Recordings of Tolkien reading excerpts from The Hobbit and The Lord of the Rings were made in Malvern in 1952, at the home of George Sayer. The recordings were later issued on long-playing gramophone records. In the liner notes for J.R.R Tolkien Reads and Sings his The Hobbit & The Fellowship of the Rings, George Sayer wrote that Tolkien would relive the book as they walked and compared parts of the Malvern Hills to the White Mountains of Gondor.

The poet W. H. Auden taught for three years in the 1930s at The Downs School, in the Malvern Hills. He wrote many poems there, including: This Lunar Beauty; Let Your Sleeping Head; My Love, Fish in the Unruffled Lakes; and Out on the Lawn I Lie in Bed. He also wrote the long poem about the hills and their views, called simply The Malverns.

In his 1941 novel Mr Lucton's Freedom Halesowen-born novelist Francis Brett Young describes sleeping out on the Malvern Hills and seeing the sunrise over the town.

=== Art ===
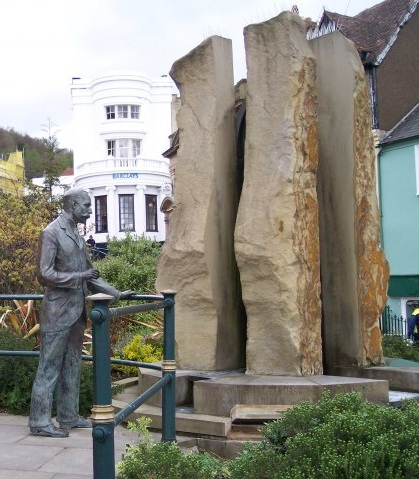
The Enigma Fountain and statue of Edward Elgar, a group of sculptures by artist Rose Garrard, on Belle Vue Terrace

Works of art in Malvern include fountains, statues, and Malvern water spouts by the sculptor Rose Garrard. Among her sculptures are the drinking spout, Malvhina, on Belle Vue Terrace, which was unveiled on 4 September 1998, and the statue of Sir Edward Elgar and the Enigma Fountain, also on Belle Vue Terrace (unveiled by Andrew Mountbatten-Windsor, then Prince Andrew, Duke of York, on 26 May 2000). A plaque referring to the unveiling was removed in 2026 following Andrew's arrest on suspicion of misconduct in public office.

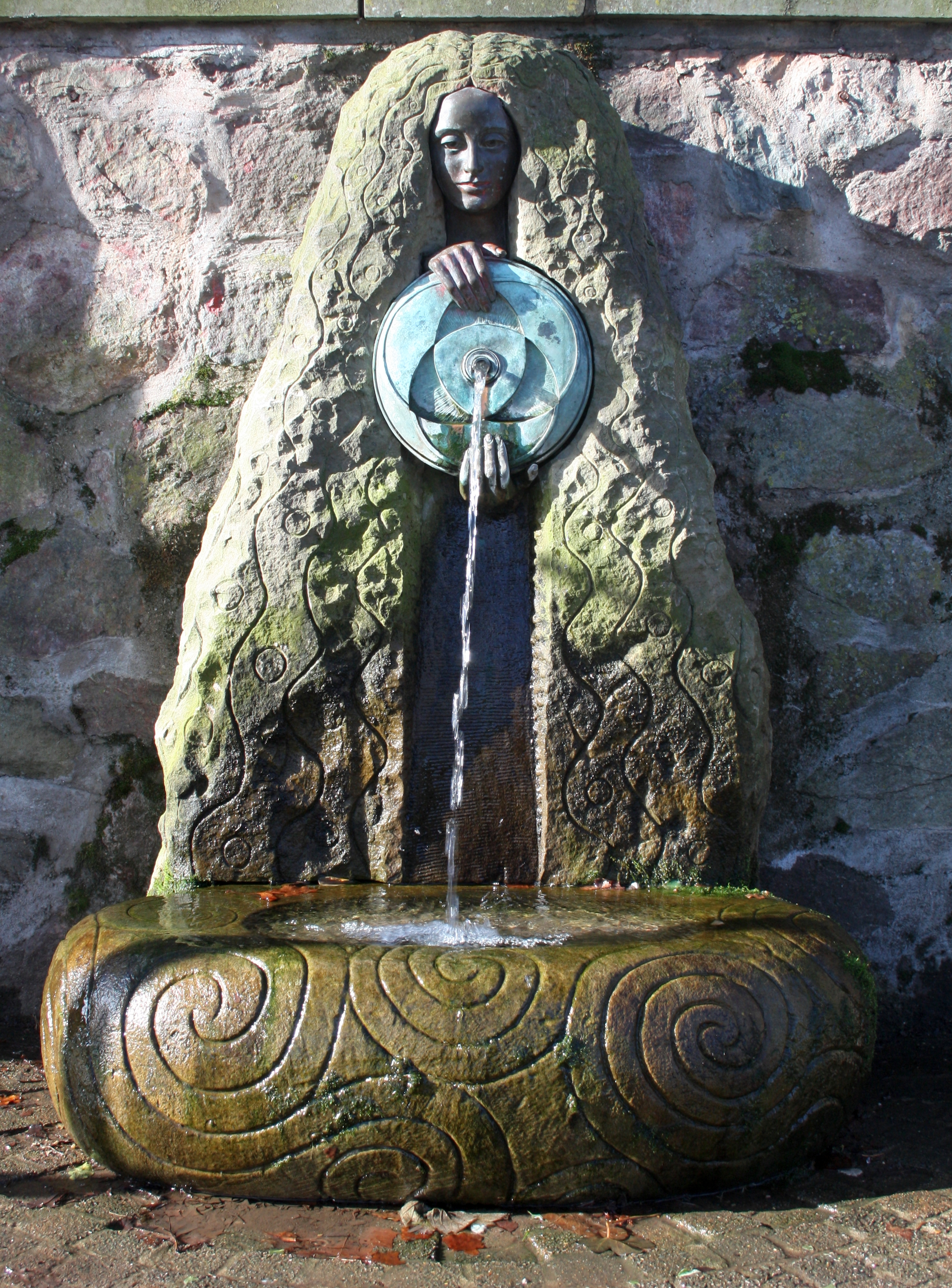
The Malvhina Fountain in the town centre, a sculpture by artist Rose Garrard.

Garrard's Hand of Peace war memorial, a sculpture in Portland stone is in the Barnards Green suburb of Malvern.

Paintings of Malvern include Little Malvern Church by Joseph Farington now held by the Royal Academy, and a squared drawing by the art historian Robert Witt in the collection of the Courtauld Institute, Joseph Powell's Great Malvern Priory ... from the North East (1797), now in the British Watercolours collection of the Victoria and Albert Museum.

David Prentice, artist and one of the founder members of Birmingham's Ikon Gallery, has lived and worked in Malvern since 1990. He started painting the Malvern Hills when he retired in 1983.

A sculpture of two buzzards by Walenty Pytel was installed in Rosebank Gardens, Great Malvern to commemorate the Queen's Diamond Jubilee in November 2012.

=== Television ===
Elgar, a drama documentary made in 1962 by the British director Ken Russell, was filmed on location in Malvern and Worcester. Several scenes were filmed in Malvern at locations including 'Forli' in Alexandra Road, 'Craeg Lea' in Malvern Wells and St Ann's Well in Great Malvern. Made for BBC Television's long-running Monitor programme, it dramatised the life of the composer Edward Elgar. The film significantly raised the public profile of the composer.

The Malvern landscape forms the backdrop for Penda's Fen, a 1974 British television play written by David Rudkin and directed by Alan Clarke for the BBC's Play for Today series. It tells the story of Stephen, a vicar's son who has visions of angels, Edward Elgar, and King Penda, the last pagan ruler of England. The final scene of the play, where the protagonist has an apparitional experience of King Penda and the "mother and father of England" and King Penda, is set on the Malvern Hills.

The Tank Quarry on North Hill and West of England Quarry on the Worcestershire Beacon were used as locations in the Doctor Who serial The Krotons, starring Patrick Troughton. The serial was broadcast in four weekly parts from 28 December 1968 to 18 January 1969.

Great Malvern railway station featured in 1975 as the commuter-belt railway station in the first episode of Survivors (1975 TV series), the post-apocalyptic fiction drama television series created by Terry Nation and produced by Terence Dudley at the BBC.

=== Local media ===
Regional TV news is provided by BBC West Midlands and ITV Central. Television signals are received from either the Sutton Coldfield and local relay transmitters.

Local radio stations are BBC Hereford and Worcester, Heart West Midlands, Radio Wyvern, Capital Mid-Counties, Greatest Hits Radio Herefordshire & Worcestershire, Hits Radio Herefordshire & Worcestershire, and Smooth West Midlands.

The Malvern Gazette, founded 1855, and the Malvern Observer, a freesheet launched in 2013, are local Malvern newspapers published weekly.

=== Malvern water ===
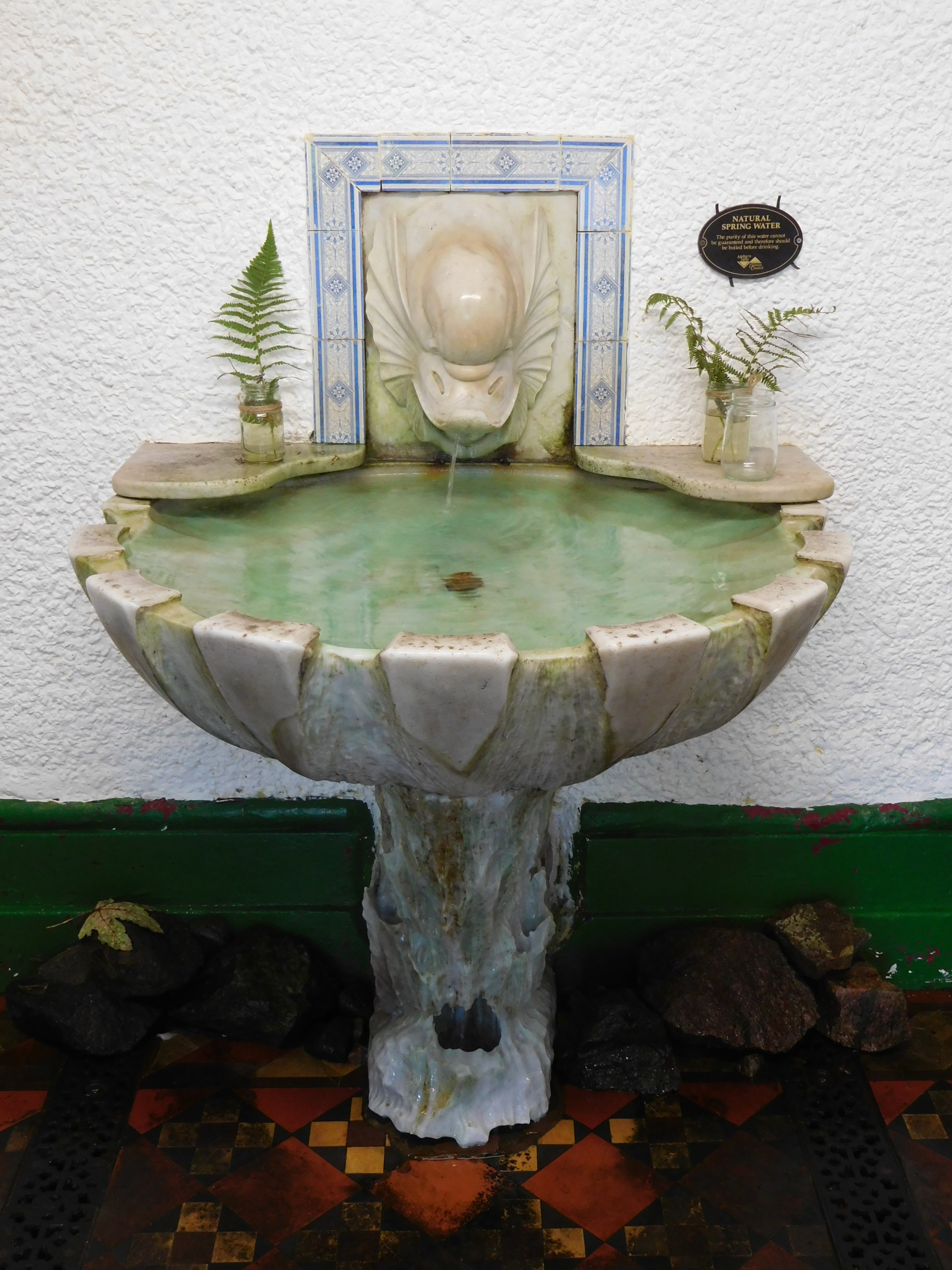
St Ann's Well spout

Malvern spring water flows freely from a number of fountains or spouts throughout the Malvern area. Upkeep of these historical springs is funded by several organisations, including the town council, the Heritage Lottery Fund, The Malvern Spa Association, and the Area of Outstanding Natural Beauty. The water became famous for containing "nothing at all". It was the reason for Malvern becoming a spa town and has formed a part of both local and national culture since Queen Elizabeth I made a point of drinking it in public in the 16th century, and Queen Victoria refused to travel without it. It is also a bottled water used by Queen Elizabeth II Until November 2010, when the plant was closed due to lack of profitability, millions of litres of Malvern water were bottled annually by Coca-Cola under the Schweppes brand in a factory near Malvern and distributed worldwide. Malvern water is still being bottled from the original source by a family-run business under the name Holywell Spring Water.

=== Twin town ===
Malvern has since 2013 been twinned with Mariánské Lázně, a spa town in the Czech Republic, and since 2016 also with Bagnères-de-Bigorre, a spa town in France.

== Places of worship ==
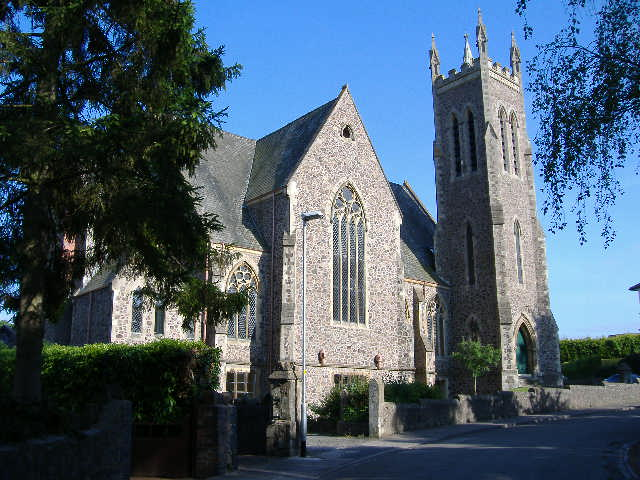
Landsdown Methodist Church, Great Malvern

In addition to the 12th century priory, during and shortly after Malvern's expansion throughout the second half of the 19th century over twenty Christian churches were built. Many of these are reproductions of 13th and 14th century architecture including Church of St Matthias, Malvern Link (C of E) begun in 1843, which has a full set of ten ringing bells on which the first full peal of Grandsire Triples was rung on 1 June 1901. One of the most recent buildings is St Mary's Church (C of E), in Sherrards Green, a modern church built in 1958.

Pevsner mentions the following 19th and early 20th century churches in Malvern in his book on Worcestershire:

- All Saints, (The Wyche), 1903, by Nevinson and Newton (or possibly Troyte Griffith);
- St. Andrew in Poolbrook, 1885, contains a font inscribed 1724, by Blomfield; Ascension (Leigh Sinton Road) 1903, by Sir Walter Tapper, with a high metal screen by G. Bainbridge Reynolds;
- Christ Church (Avenue Road), 1875–6, by T. D. Barry & Sons, with unexpected cross gable;
- Chapel of the Convent of the Holy Name, (Ranelagh Road), 1893, by Comper, with wagon roof and stained glass;
- St. Joseph (Newtown Road), 1876, by T. R. Donnelly;
- St. Matthias (Church Road), original by Sir Giles Gilbert Scott, 1844–46, enlarged and altered by F. W. Hunt, 1880–81, painted dado and stained glass;
- Our Lady and St. Edmund (College Road), 1905, by P. P. Pugin;
- St. Peter (St. Peter's Road), 1863–6, by G. E. Street, with crazy paving of Malvern granite;
- Holy Trinity, (Worcester Road), 1850–1, by S. Daukes, enlarged 1872 by Haddon brothers; with plate and stained glass;
- Congregational Church, (Queen's Drive), 1875, by J. Tait of Leicester;
- Emmanuel, (Countess of Huntingdon's Connexion), 1874, by Haddon Brothers.

== Health and emergency services ==
Malvern has a community hospital on Worcester Road in Malvern Link. The hospital was constructed on the grounds of a former independent preparatory school, Seaford Court, and began operation in 2010. It was officially opened by Princess Anne in March 2011. This replaced the former community hospital on Lansdowne Crescent.

Major health facilities are provided by hospitals in Worcester. The town has seven health centres, including a health complex in Malvern Link and a group practice on Pickersleigh Road. Malvern also has several nursing and retirement homes for the care of senior citizens. The Malvern area is covered by the Midlands Air Ambulance service, which has operated from the site of Strensham motorway services since 1991.

Malvern is served by the West Midlands Ambulance Service operated by the NHS Trust. The ambulance station is in Victoria Road, Great Malvern, near the town centre.

Other emergency services are provided by West Mercia Police from a station in Victoria Road, and the Hereford and Worcester Fire and Rescue Service that has a station in Worcester Road, Malvern Link.

== Transport ==
The A449 road runs through the centre of Malvern, connecting it to Worcester and Ledbury. The M5 motorway is accessible at junctions 7 and 8 to the east of Malvern. The M50 motorway, also known as the Ross Spur, to the south is accessed at junction 1 on the A38 road between Tewkesbury and Malvern.

Great Malvern and Malvern Link railway stations are approximately one mile (1.6 km) apart. Great Western Railway and West Midlands Trains operate services as far as Hereford, Birmingham New Street, and London Paddington.

Several circular urban bus routes connect the main residential and commercial areas and out-of-town shopping malls. Other routes serve the surrounding villages and Worcester city centre. Most services are operated by First Midland Red.

The nearest airports are Birmingham Airport, about an hour's drive away, and Gloucestershire Airport, which is used mainly for private charter flights.

== Education ==
=== Primary schools ===
Elementary education is provided by thirteen primary schools in the town and its suburbs including eight Church of England, one Roman Catholic, and four non-denominational state schools. With the exception of The Grove (1962), Poolbrook Primary School (1977), and Northleigh (1991) that replaced the Cowleigh C of E school destroyed by arson in 1989, all the Malvern primary schools were established between 1836 and 1916, during and shortly after the town's rapid development as a spa.

=== High schools ===
The Chase School in the suburb of Barnards Green near the town centre is a secondary school with around 1300 pupils. It is a specialist Technology, Language and Science college under the specialist schools programme, previously designated a Beacon School.

Dyson Perrins Church of England Academy in the northern part of the large suburb of Malvern Link, a Church of England school with almost 1000 pupils, is a specialist Sports College.

Hanley Castle High School, with around 1000 pupils, including its sixth form centre, is a specialist Language College and was founded in 1326 as a chantry school, making it one of the oldest schools in England. Although the school is in the village of Hanley Castle, about 4 miles (6.4 km) from the town, many of its pupils come from the Malvern area.

=== Independent schools ===
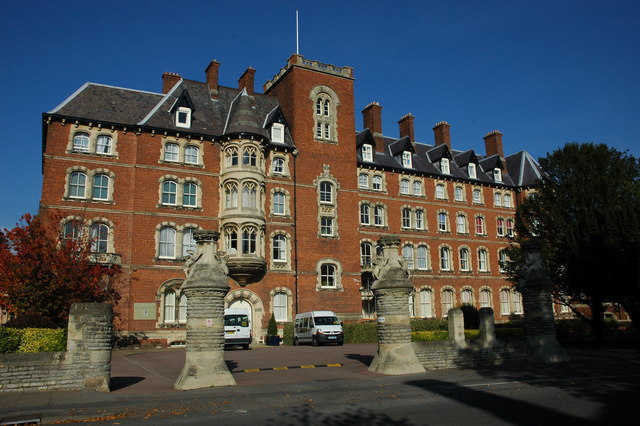
Malvern St James girls school main building

One large independent 'public' schools – Malvern College for boys and girls and Malvern St James for girls – now remains following mergers of Malvern's many private primary and secondary schools.

Malvern College is a coeducational public school, founded in 1865. Until 1992, it was a school for boys aged 13 to 18. Following a merger with Ellerslie School for Girls in 1992 it became coeducational. Among its alumni are two Nobel Laureates (James Meade and Francis William Aston), an Olympic Gold medalist (Arnold Jackson), and leading politicians. Further acquisition of Hillstone and merger with The Downs (in nearby Colwall) preparatory schools has established an independently run coeducational feeder school, The Downs Malvern, for pupils up to 13 years old.

The Abbey College is an international boarding school providing education mainly for students from countries outside the United Kingdom. Founded in 1974, it provides pre university preparation for mixed gender students aged 14 to 20.

Malvern St James was formed in 2006 by the merger of Malvern Girls' College founded in founded in 1893 and St James's School, West Malvern (formerly St James's and The Abbey) and mergers with many local private schools for girls. It was the last of the independent girls' schools in the Malvern area. The main building of Malvern St James on the campus of the former Malvern Girls' College since 2011 is the former Imperial Hotel, built in the second half of the 19th century. Hatley St James, a Victorian mansion on Albert Road South, and former residence of the Seton-Karr family, was used as a house for the school. Due to accumulated financial debt, the school was forced to close down permanently in 2026.

=== Further and higher education ===
Malvern Hills College, founded and built in 1928 was a centre for further education providing government certificate vocational courses for adults and post 14-year-old students until it closed down in the summer of 2021. Malvern also has an active University of the Third Age that was founded at Malvern Hills College in 1995. Its inaugural meeting was attended by around 150 members of the public, and by 2011 it had over 80 interest groups and 1,100 members. Since 2009 the campus of the former St James school, now merged into Malvern St James, is the new home of Regents Theological College, the training centre of the Elim Pentecostal Church. The theological college which offers undergraduate and graduate degrees also accepts Christians from a variety of Protestant Christian denominations.

== Leisure ==
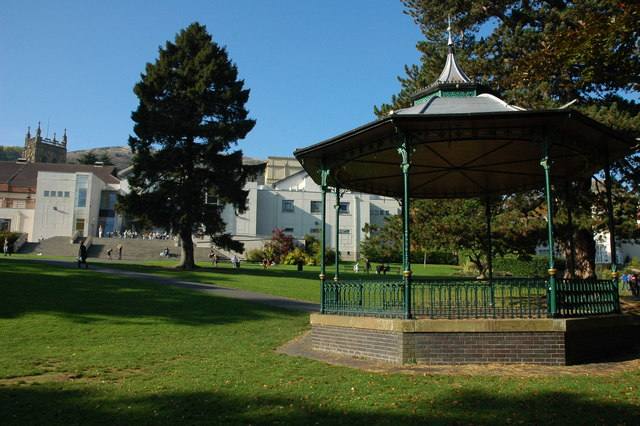
Priory Park with Malvern Theatres complex and Priory Church tower in the background

The Priory Park with its adjoining Malvern Splash pool and Winter Gardens complex occupies a large area in the centre of the town. The Winter Gardens complex is home to the Malvern Theatres, a cinema, a concert venue/banqueting room, bars and cafeterias. For almost half a century, the Malvern Winter Gardens has also been a leisure centre and a major regional venue for classical music, and concerts by major rock bands of the 60s, 70s and 80s. The Splash Leisure Complex flanks the eastern boundary of Priory Park and has an indoor swimming pool and gymnasium. In the town centre is also an extensive public Library that includes access to the Internet and many community services.

The Worcestershire Way, a waymarked long-distance trail in Worcestershire, runs 31 miles (50 km) from Bewdley to Great Malvern.

== Sport ==
The Manor Park Club multi-sports complex, close to the town centre, provides indoor and outdoor sports facilities including tennis, squash, indoor bowls, racketball, archery and table tennis. It is assisted by grants from various bodies, including the Malvern Hills District Council, the Sport England Lottery, and the Lawn Tennis Association. In 2010, a new indoor facility was unveiled at the club by tennis player Tim Henman. Traditional outdoor bowls is played on a green in Priory Park. Victoria Park in Malvern Link provides space for field sports and tennis. Malvern Town F.C. has a football first team that plays in the Southern League Premier Division South and which has twice reached the third qualifying round of the FA Cup. The Malvern Hills are a popular launching site for hang gliding and paragliding and Malvern has a local hang gliding club. Cricket is provided for at Barnards Green Cricket Club, a professional class ground.

== Notable people ==
In addition to those born in Malvern, many notable people came to the town to provide or partake of its Hydrotherapy, to be educated or to teach at the large number of independent boarding schools such as Malvern College with its long list of notable alumni, and its elementary school, the Downs, and Malvern St James for girls, that still remain active into the 21st century. A significant number of people were scientists at the Telecommunications Research Establishment (TRE), and its successor the Royal Radar Establishment, the country's largest secret defence research facility with around 4,000 civil servants and military personnel, and the quango it became (as of 2011), QinetiQ. The Malvern Hills, a designated Area of Outstanding Natural Beauty, have also inspired several poets and novelists.

- Michael P. Barnett, (24 March 1929 – 13 March 2012) was a British theoretical chemist and computer scientist; researcher at the Royal Radar Establishment in 1953.
- Nigel Coates, architect and emeritus professor of the Royal College of Art grew up in Malvern and was educated at Hanley Castle Grammar School.
- Edward Elgar, composer, lived and taught in Great Malvern. He is buried in the graveyard of St Wulstan's Roman Catholic Church in the village of Little Malvern.
- Charles Hastings, founder of the British Medical Association, spent his final years at Hastings House, Barnards Green.
- William Huskisson (1770-1830), Tory cabinet minister and first politician to be killed in a railway accident, was born at Birtsmorton Court where he lived to age 13.
- William Langland's allegorical narrative poem Piers Plowman (written c. 1360–1387) begins on the Malvern Hills.
- C. S. Lewis, novelist, was a pupil at the preparatory school Cherbourg House and Malvern College. He boarded at these two establishments between early 1911 and June 1914.
- David Mitchell, author whose works include Cloud Atlas (also a 2012 Hollywood movie) and Black Swan Green, the latter taking place in Malvern. Mitchell was educated at Hanley Castle Grammar School.
- Jeremy Paxman, journalist, author, broadcaster, presenter of University Challenge, was educated at Malvern College.
- Charles William Dyson Perrins, (1864–1958), art collector, philanthropist and local government office holder.
- Baroness Smith of Malvern, politician, former British home secretary, was born and raised in Malvern.
- Geoffrey Dummer, whose concepts ultimately led to the development of the integrated circuit, commonly called the microchip, in the late 1940s and early 1950s at TRE in Malvern and is interred in Malvern cemetery.

== Related settlements ==
Malvern is the source of the name of many towns and villages, including Malverne, in New York state, as one of the many in the US and around 15 others around the world in current or former British possessions.
