= Rose Garrard =

British artist and author

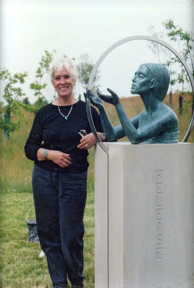
- Garrard with her work Spirit of Hope in Bretby, Derbyshire
- Born: 21 September 1946 (age 79); Bewdley, Worcestershire, England
- Education: Birmingham School of Art; Chelsea College of Arts
- Occupations: Artist and author
- Website: rosegarrard.co.uk

Rose Garrard (born 21 September 1946, Bewdley, Worcestershire, England) is an installation, video and performance artist, sculptor and author. Garrard's works have been exhibited at the Victoria and Albert Museum, the Tate Gallery, the British Council maintained Great Britain pavilion at the 1984 Venice Biennale, and national galleries in Austria and Canada.

== Early life and education ==
Rose Garrard was born in Bewdley, Worcestershire, her family moving to Malvern when she was three months old. For many years, her mother was the proprietor of Collector’s Corner, an antique shop in Malvern. Her father who combined life as an artist with a career as a soldier, ran the Middle East College of Art in the Sahara Desert after the Second World War to rehabilitate officers to civilian life, receiving the MBE in 1953.

Garrard received her foundation qualification for Art & Design from Stourbridge College of Art in 1965. Garrard went on to achieve a first-class Honours degree in Sculpture from Birmingham School of Art in 1969, before receiving a Higher Diploma in Sculpture from Chelsea College of Arts in 1970. Garrard received a scholarship from the British Council/French Government to attend the Ecole de Beaux Arts, Paris, from 1970 to 1971, where she won the Prix d'Honneur Gold Medal for Sculpture in 1971.

== Early artistic career ==
Since the late 1960s, Garrard's artistic practice has been engaged with ideas concerning gender, identity, status and power, binding together personal experiences and historical references. After her graduate show Boundaries in 1969, Garrard won the Multiples International Prize, judged by Eduardo Paolozzi at Modern Art Oxford before exhibiting her "especially fascinating" sculptures of translucent Perspex-shrouded female figures at venues including Serpentine Gallery. In 1977, Garrard had her first solo exhibition, Incidents in a Garden, at Acme Gallery, Covent Garden, which included performance art as well as sculpture and included the artwork "Monument" featuring a bronze patina of Hitler and Churchill seated having tea.

For the 1983 solo exhibition Frames of Mind, at Kettles Yard, Garrard challenged the art historical assumption that women should be contained by the artistic frame (as a model) rather than be seen as creator or artist themselves. For "Models Triptych", an artwork created for this exhibition, Garrard depicts three female artists who were well-known during their lifetimes, but immediately fell into posthumous obscurity, in open frames, intending them to be seen as Pandoras escaping from their boxes. In the consequential exploration of "historical reclamation and self recovery", Garrard then took up a three-month artist residency in 1984 at Birmingham Museum and Art Gallery, in which she examined the virtual absence of women artists and the attribution of anonymous works to male artists in the Museum's historical collection.

== Accident and later artistic practice ==
In 1988, Garrard was involved in a serious road traffic accident that meant she spent time in the fractures ward of St Bartholomew's Hospital and caused her left arm to be in a cast. During her time in hospital, Garrard was inspired to create works for her commission for the 1988 Biennale of Experimental Art, including "Out of Line", an installation and live work featuring recordings with patients, plaster casts of body parts and a video showing accidents reported on television news. The accident also inspired a series of mixed-media drawings entitled "Talisman" based on an ancient gnostic text "The Thunder, Perfect Mind", which was re-discovered in 1946. Garrard found the text strengthening during her healing period and created artwork based on the images she visualised from the text.

In the early 1990s, Garrard explored a new direction of multi-disciplined practice during artist residencies at New Art Gallery in Calgary and Vancouver Art Gallery. These residencies involved site specific installations in which Garrard would talk with members of the public, focusing on their experience of oppression and from which she would create visual images and explore local issues and concerns. Garrard repeated this format of artistic practice during her 1994 retrospective entitled Archiving my own History, documentation of works 1969 > 1994 at Cornerhouse.

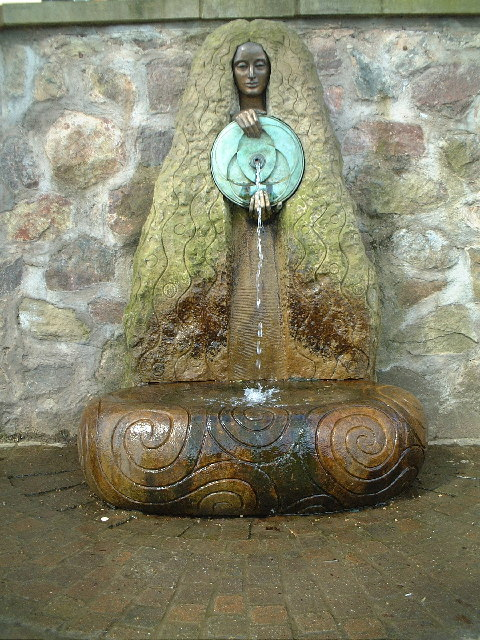
The Malvinha drinking spout in the town centre of Malvern, a sculpture by Garrard.

In 1995, Garrard moved her studio from London back to the Malvern Hills. In response to local newspaper appeals for ideas to help regenerate Great Malvern, she proposed "The Spring Water Arts Project", the creation of a new sculpture trail to reclaim lost spring sites throughout the town. Among her sculptures created after her move back to the Malvern Hills are the Enigma Fountain including the statue of Sir Edward Elgar (Unveiled by The Duke of York on Belle Vue Terrace, Great Malvern on 26 May 2000). Its cost of £50,000 was funded by the Malvern Hills District Council, public subscription, and support from by West Midlands Arts, Severn Trent Water, and local businesses. Other works include the drinking spout, Malvhina, which was unveiled on 4 September 1998, the Hand of Peace war memorial, a sculpture in Portland stone located in the Barnards Green suburb of Malvern, Women's Work 1998, in Bilston, Wolverhampton, England, created in bronze, Welsh slate, and brick, and the Cascade Gates 2007, in welded steel at the Clock Tower Well Room in North Malvern.

== Notable artworks ==
- "Models Triptych" (1982 – 83), New Hall Art Collection, Murray Edwards College
- "Talisman: The Wooden Box From Her Father" (1988), Victoria & Albert Museum

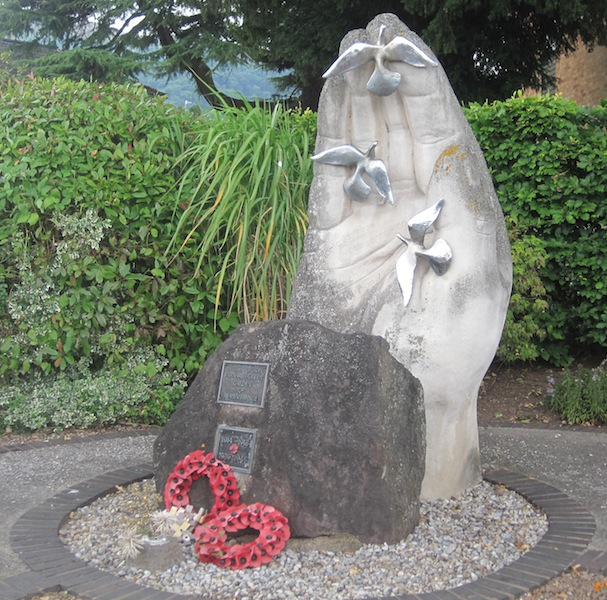
Hand of Peace war memorial, a sculpture in Portland stone located in Barnards Green

== Solo exhibitions ==
- Incidents in a Garden, Acme Gallery, 1977
- Surveillance, International Performance Symposium, 1980
- The Fall, Women Live, Arnolfini, 1982
- Frames of Mind, Kettles Yard, 1983
- Between Ourselves, Ikon Gallery, 1984
- Openings, Laing Art Gallery, 1985
- Casting Room One, Third Generation of Women Sculptors, Canterbury Festival, 1986
- Redressing the Balance, Neue Gesellschaft fur bildende Kunst, 1987
- Talisman, Louise Hallett Gallery, 1988
- Calgary Conversation, live-art residency, New Art Gallery Calgary, 1991
- Disclosing Dialogues, live-art residency, Vancouver Art Gallery, 1992
- Archiving my own History, documentation of works 1969 > 1994, Cornerhouse, 1994
- Rose Garrard: Arena for Conversation, South London Gallery, 1994

== Historian and author ==
Garrard became heavily involved with the restoration of the local springs and the history of Malvern, and her research carried out in 2006 demonstrated for the first time that well dressing has been part of the tradition in the Malvern area since the 12th and 13th centuries. In 2001, she began organising the well dressing campaign in Malvern, which has become an annual event with more than 28 wells being dressed.

As an author, Garrard has written three books based on Malvern, including two about aspects of the springs, and A Malvern Treasury, published in 2010, that was written on the recommendation of a local bookshop, Beacon Books, due to previous comprehensive histories of the town by other authors being out of print.

== Personal life ==
After meeting at Birmingham School of Art in 1966 and forming a friendship, Garrard married fellow artist Kerry Trengrove at Wood Green Register Office in 1969. The couple separated in 1987 before divorcing in 1989.

== Publications ==
- Malvern: Hill of Fountains – Ancient Origins, Beliefs and Superstitions surrounding Wells and Well Dressing (2006) Aspect Design
- Donkeys’ Years on the Malvern Hills (2008), Aspect Design, ISBN 978-1-905795-18-5
- A Malvern Treasury (2010), Aspect Design, ISBN 978-1-905795-56-7
- archiving my own history : documentation of works, 1969–1994 (1994), Cornerhouse, Manchester, ISBN 1-897586-07-8, ISBN 978-1-897586-07-5, OCLC 31381367
- Talisman (1988), Louise Hallett Gallery, 1988. ISBN 0-9513047-2-0, ISBN 978-0-9513047-2-3, OCLC 19269136
- Redressing the balance (1987), Neue Gesellschaft für Bildende Kunst, Berlin. OCLC 18993481
