= Newland, Worcestershire =

Village located in Malvern Hills, England

Coordinates: 52.1344°N 2.2997°W

Newland
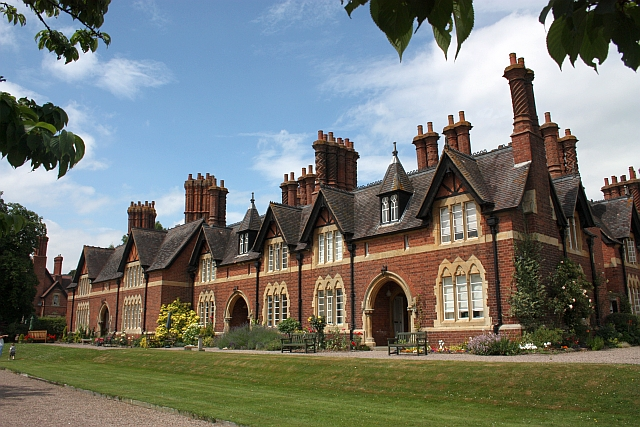
- Beauchamp Community alms houses, built 1864, Newland

- Location within Worcestershire
- Population: 298
- OS grid reference: SO796485
- Civil parish: Newland
- District: Malvern Hills
- Shire county: Worcestershire
- Region: West Midlands
- Country: England
- Sovereign state: United Kingdom
- Post town: MALVERN
- Postcode district: WR13
- Police: West Mercia
- Fire: Hereford and Worcester
- Ambulance: West Midlands
- UK Parliament: West Worcestershire

Newland is a village and civil parish on the north-eastern edge of Malvern Link, Worcestershire, England, on the A449 road.

The village lies on the edge of the 6.5 hectare Newland Common, which is protected by the Malvern Hills Conservators and is centred on the traditional English Swan Inn public house. Adjacent to the Swan is a cricket field run as part of Barnards Green Cricket Club. Both the Swan and the cricket field are owned by the Trustees of the Madresfield Estate - a large local landowner. There is no shop or post office in the village.

The population of the parish was 298 in 2021.

== Churches and history ==
The first church at Newland was St Michael's, dating from c1215 and rebuilt in the fifteenth century. It was demolished in 1865.

The St Leonard Chapelry, in Newland is associated with the Beauchamp Community of retired Church of England priests. It was built alongside almshouses on land given by Frederick Lygon, 6th Earl Beauchamp to set up a community based on Anglo-Catholic principles. Originally the almshouses provided homes for retired workers from the Madresfield Estate and for the poor of the parish and now house practising Anglicans and retired clergy from across the country. The chair of trustees is Lady Rosalind Morrison, grand daughter of the 7th Earl Beauchamp and heiress of Madresfield.

== Transport ==
=== Rail ===
Rail services are provided from Malvern Link railway station located in Worcester Road about one mile away, with direct services to Worcester, Hereford, Birmingham, Oxford and London.

Alongside the Hereford to Worcester railway line to the north of the village is a former halt, with a signal box and level crossing. This is now a showman site of mobile homes where showpeople live and store their rides, amusements and trade equipment.

=== Bus ===
Several local bus services connect Newland with the surrounding area with other routes serving areas further afield including the Malvern to Worcester route 44, 44A, 44B operated by First Diamond serving stops in Malvern Link, Link Top, Great Malvern, and Barnards Green.

=== Air ===
The nearest major airport is Birmingham approximately one hour by road via the M5 and M42 motorways. Gloucestershire Airport located at Staverton, in the Borough of Tewkesbury near Malvern is a busy General Aviation airport used mainly for private charter and scheduled flights to destinations such as the islands of Jersey, Guernsey, and the Isle of Man, pilot training, and by the aircraft of emergency services.
