= Malvern Hills Science Park =

Science park in Worcestershire, England

Coordinates: 52.1048°N 2.3115°W

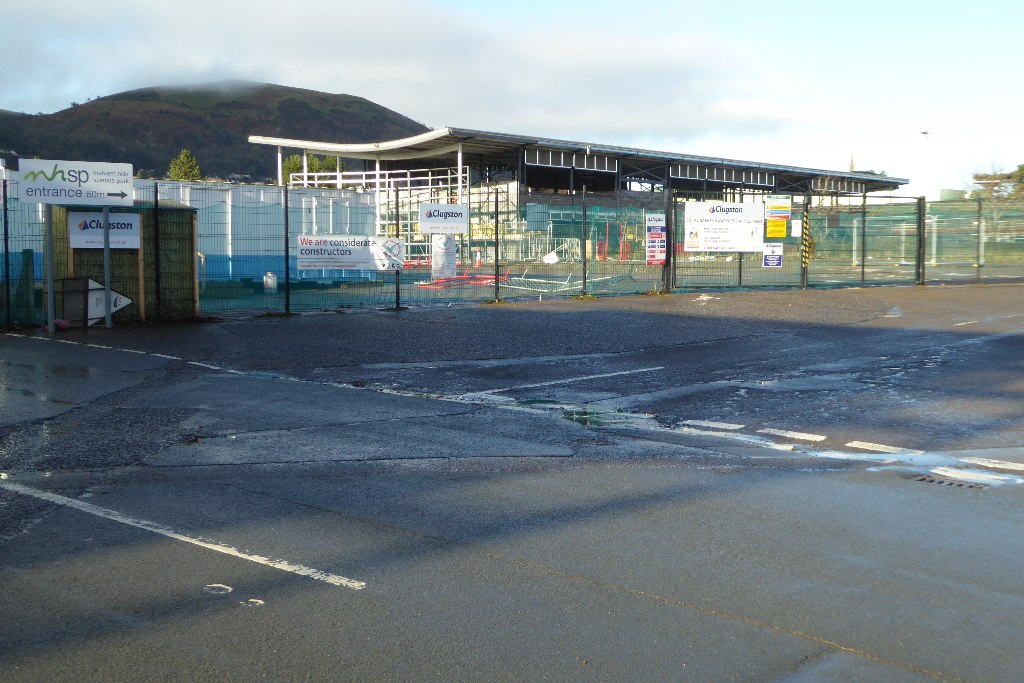
Park entrance in 2018

Malvern Hills Science Park is located on a 10-acre (4 Hectare) site in the Barnards Green suburb of Malvern, Worcestershire, England. It is a partnership between a number of partners including: QinetiQ, Malvern Hills District Council, Worcestershire County Council, and the West Midlands Regional Development Agency (Advantage West Midlands), making a total of around 40 companies as of 2019.

== Tenants ==
Current tenants:

- Ascertain Forensics
- Aspenify Inc
- Assure Technical Ltd
- Blue Box Software Ltd
- Collins Aerospace
- Callisto Life Science Partners Limited
- D-Risq Software Systems
- DeltaXML
- ESCCAP
- European Technology Risks Ltd
- Just Systems Limited
- Lantek
- Metrea LLC
- New Vision Display
- Videns Ltd
- Xoptix

Previous tenants include:

- Defence Diversification Agency
- pSiMedica
- Goodrich Corporation
- Ordnance Survey
- UTC Aerospace Systems
