= Poolbrook =

Village in Worcestershire, England

Coordinates: 52.103°N 2.303°W

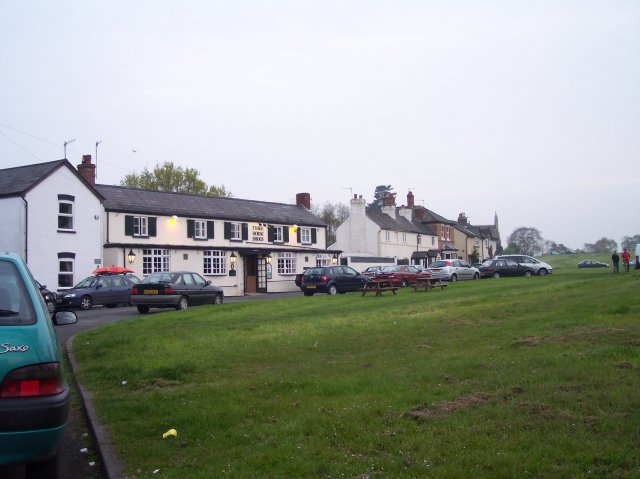
- Poolbrook village

- Location within Worcestershire
- OS grid reference: SO7944
  - London: 103 miles (166 km)
- Civil parish: Malvern
- District: Malvern Hills
- Shire county: Worcestershire
- Region: West Midlands
- Country: England
- Sovereign state: United Kingdom
- Post town: MALVERN
- Postcode district: WR14
- Dialling code: 01684
- Police: West Mercia
- Fire: Hereford and Worcester
- Ambulance: West Midlands
- UK Parliament: West Worcestershire

Poolbrook is a village and a suburb of Malvern, Worcestershire, England, situated approximately 1.5 miles (2.4 km) southeast of Great Malvern, the town's centre, and about 0.5 miles (08 km) from the Malvern suburb of Barnards Green on the Poolbrook Road (B4208). The village comprises several shops, a traditional English pub, and a number of council and private housing estates. St Andrew's C of E parish church was built in Early English style in 1882 as a memorial to a member of the Chance Brothers glass manufacturing family. The village occupies the geographical centre of the Chase ward of Malvern Town Council.

== Transport ==
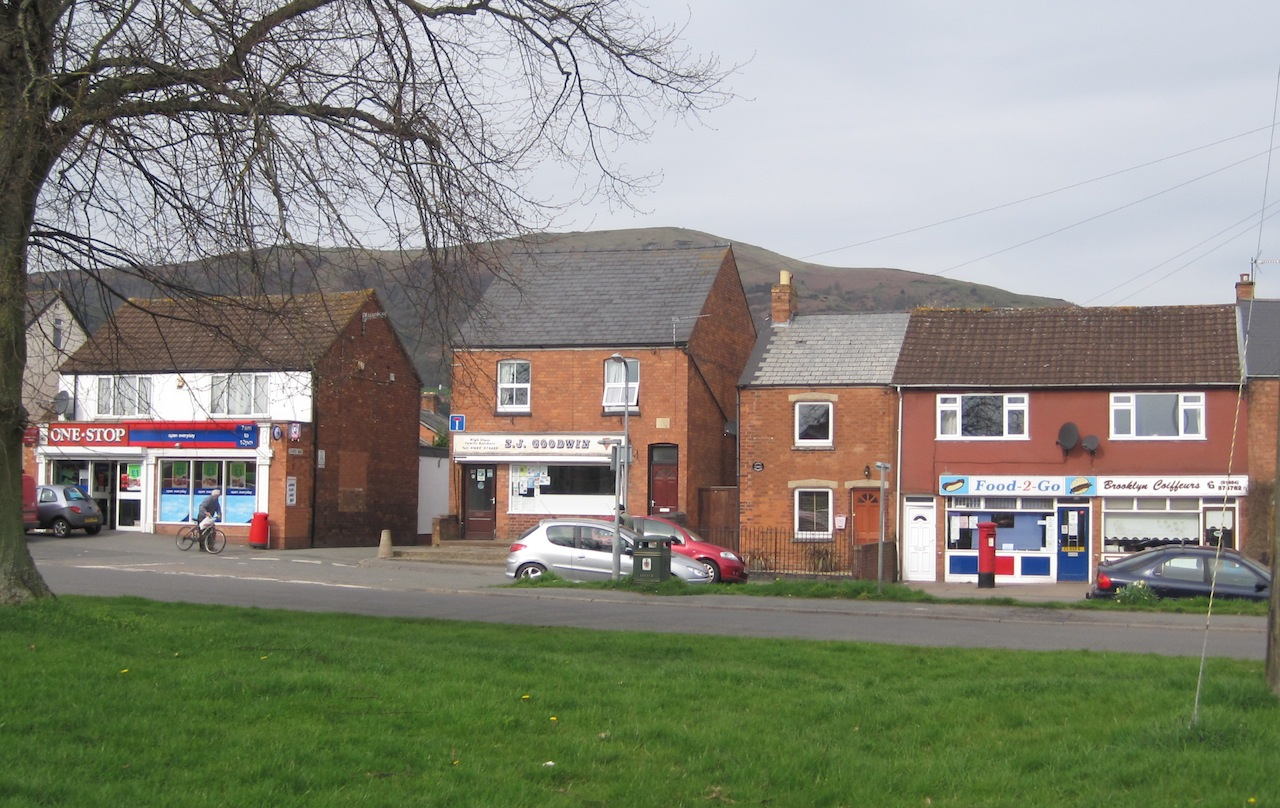
Shops in poolbrook village with the Malvern Hills in the background.

=== Rail ===
Great Malvern railway station is located in Avenue Road about 1.0 mile (1.6 km) from and provides direct services to Worcester, Hereford, Birmingham, Oxford and London.

=== Bus ===
Local bus services connect Poolbrook with Barnards Green and the surrounding area including the 42, S42 operated by Astons coaches stopping in Barnards Green bus shelter. Serving areas further afield are: the Malvern to Worcester route 44, 44A, 44B operated by First Diamond serving stops at the Barnards Green bus shelter and Pound Bank; The Worcester - Upton-upon-Severn - Malvern route 362/363 operated by Diamond serves that stops at the Barnards Green bus shelter and the Malvern - Gloucester - Cheltenham route 377 (Saturdays only) operated by Diamond, stopping at the Court Road shops and the Barnards Green bus shelter.

=== Air ===
The nearest major airport is Birmingham approximately one hour by road via the M5 and M42 motorways. Gloucestershire Airport located at Staverton, in the Borough of Tewkesbury near Malvern is a busy General Aviation airport used mainly for private charter and scheduled flights to destinations such as the islands of Jersey, Guernsey, and the Isle of Man, pilot training, and by the aircraft of emergency services.
