= Barnards Green =

Area of Malvern, Worcestershire, England

Coordinates: 52.1086°N 2.3109°W

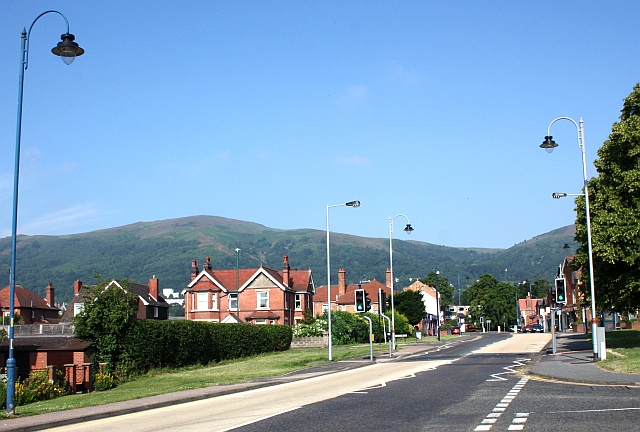
- New pedestrian crossing, Barnards Green

- Location within Worcestershire
- Population: 8,322 (2021)
- OS grid reference: SO 788 456
  - London: 103 miles (166 km)
- Civil parish: Malvern
- District: Malvern Hills
- Shire county: Worcestershire
- Region: West Midlands
- Country: England
- Sovereign state: United Kingdom
- Post town: MALVERN
- Postcode district: WR14
- Dialling code: 01684
- Police: West Mercia
- Fire: Hereford and Worcester
- Ambulance: West Midlands
- UK Parliament: West Worcestershire

Barnards Green is one of the main population areas of Malvern, Worcestershire, England, situated approximately 1 mile (1.6 km) east and downhill from Great Malvern, the town's traditional centre. It had a population of 8,322 in 2021.

== Governance ==
The southern part of Barnards Green constitutes the major part of the Chase ward of the civil parish governed by Malvern Town Council. As well as Barnards Green, the ward also includes the extensive Ministry of Defence property occupied by QinetiQ, the campus of The Chase school, the village of Poolbrook, and the largely rural south-eastern area of the adjoining Poolbrook and Malvern commons. To the north, the Barnards Green area spills into the Pickersleigh ward.

== Population ==
As with the rest of Malvern, Barnards Green owes much of its development to the area's rapid expansion from a cluster of hamlets and manors to a busy spa town during the mid-19th century. Barnards Green experienced a further population boost in 1942 when the Telecommunications Research Establishment (TRE) relocated to Malvern to occupy a site having two of its main entrances in the Barnards Green area. In the early 1950s the construction of the large Pound Bank council estate led to an increase in the population, and to the commercial activity in the shopping centre.

== Geography ==
At the centre of Barnards Green is a pear-shaped roundabout where the Barnards Green Road, B4211 / B4208 from the town centre, Pickersleigh Road (B4208), Upper Chase Road, Barnards Green Road (which forks to become Poolbrook Road (B4208) and Guarlford Road (B4211), Court Road, and Avenue Road all meet. Barnards Green is a short walk away from the Great Malvern railway station, a listed Victorian building.

== Amenities and landmarks ==
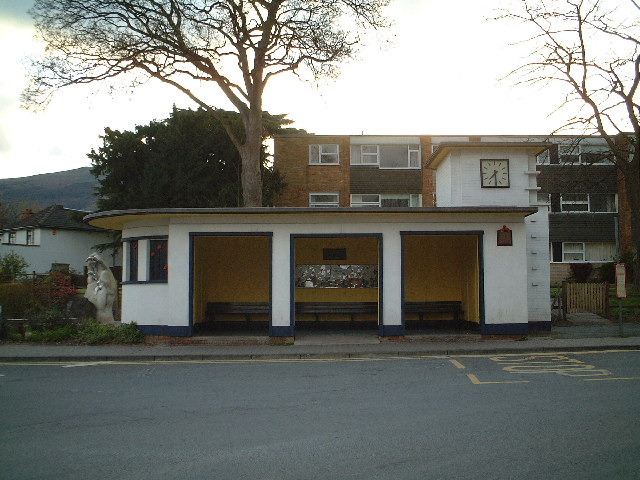
Memorial bus shelter dedicated to those that fell in the 2nd World War.

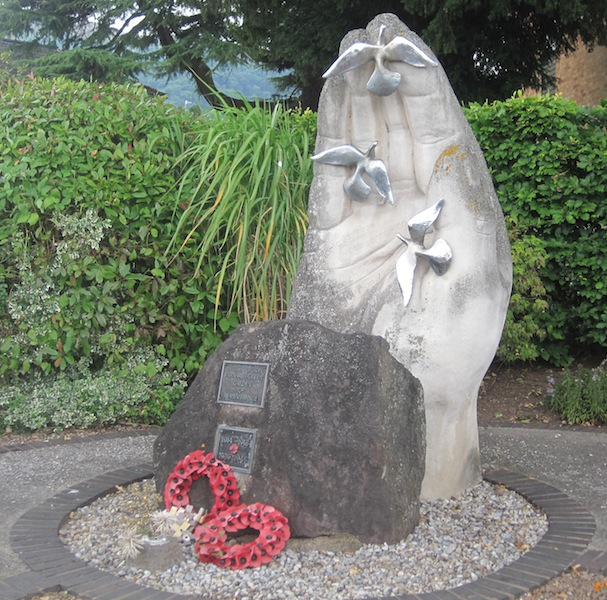
Hand of Peace, a sculpture by artist Rose Garrard

The centre of Barnards Green is marked by the Twelve Apostles Island, a pear-shaped traffic roundabout in the central shopping area with its Art Deco style memorial bus shelter, and the nearby Hand of Peace sculpture in Portland stone by artist Rose Garrard. while several large housing developments around the main shopping area such as Pound Bank, are referred to by more local names. Almost every kind of urban commerce is represented in the immediate area of the island by around 60 shops and offices, including a butcher, bakery, patisserie, Post Office, cafe, locksmith, DIY store, convenience stores, a supermarket, a small industrial complex, retirement homes, a guest house, law offices, and a variety of snack bars, and traditional and ethnic take-aways.

== Education ==
The larger of Malvern's two secondary schools, The Chase, administered by the Worcestershire Educational Services, draws 1,400 students aged 11 – 18 from the Malvern district and is located a few hundred yards away from the village centre in Geraldine Road, and two primary schools are located in the immediate area.

== Sport and leisure ==
The home ground of Malvern Town Football Club is located approximately 0.5 miles (0.80 km) from the traffic island, in Langland Avenue with Barnards Green Cricket Club being a short distance away in North End Lane. A basketball facility constructed in 2021 lies partway between Barnards Green and Malvern Link.

== Transport ==
=== Rail ===
Great Malvern railway station is located in Avenue Road about 0.3 miles (0.48 km) from the Barnards Green roundabout, and provides direct services to Worcester, Hereford, Birmingham, Oxford and London.

=== Bus ===
Several local bus services connect Barnards Green with the surrounding area including the 42, S42 operated by Astons coaches stopping in Barnards Green bus shelter. Serving areas further afield are: the Malvern to Worcester route 44, 44A, 44B operated by First Diamond serving stops at the Barnards Green bus shelter and Pound Bank; The Worcester – Upton-upon-Severn – Malvern route 362/363 operated by Diamond serves that stops at the Barnards Green bus shelter and the Malvern – Gloucester – Cheltenham route 377 (Saturdays only) operated by Diamond, stopping at the Court Road shops and the Barnards Green bus shelter.

=== Air ===
The nearest major airport is Birmingham approximately one hour by road via the M5 and M42 motorways. Gloucestershire Airport located at Staverton, in the Borough of Tewkesbury near Malvern is a busy General Aviation airport used mainly for private charter and scheduled flights to destinations such as the islands of Jersey, Guernsey, and the Isle of Man, pilot training, and by the aircraft of emergency services.

== Notable residents ==
Charles Hastings, founder of the British Medical Association, spent his final years at Hastings House in Barnards Green.
