= Great Malvern =

Area of Malvern, Worcestershire, England

Coordinates: 52.1114°N 2.329°W

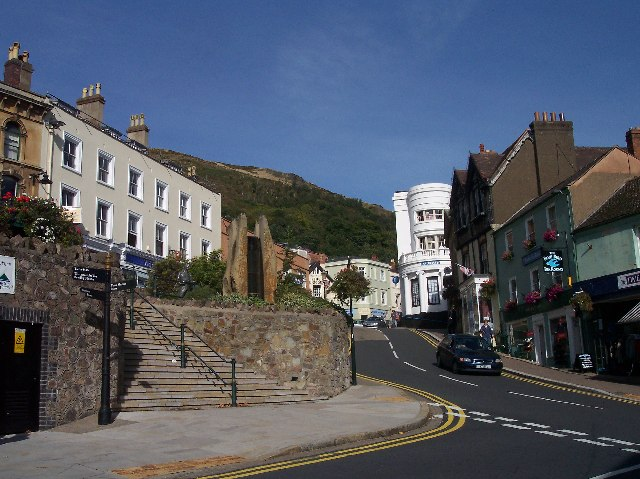
- View of the junction of Church Street and Bellevue Terrace, with North Hill in background, and the Elgar Enigma statue to the left.

- Location within Worcestershire
- OS grid reference: SO786459
- Civil parish: Malvern
- District: Malvern Hills
- Shire county: Worcestershire
- Region: West Midlands
- Country: England
- Sovereign state: United Kingdom
- Post town: MALVERN
- Postcode district: WR14
- Dialling code: 01684
- Police: West Mercia
- Fire: Hereford and Worcester
- Ambulance: West Midlands
- UK Parliament: West Worcestershire

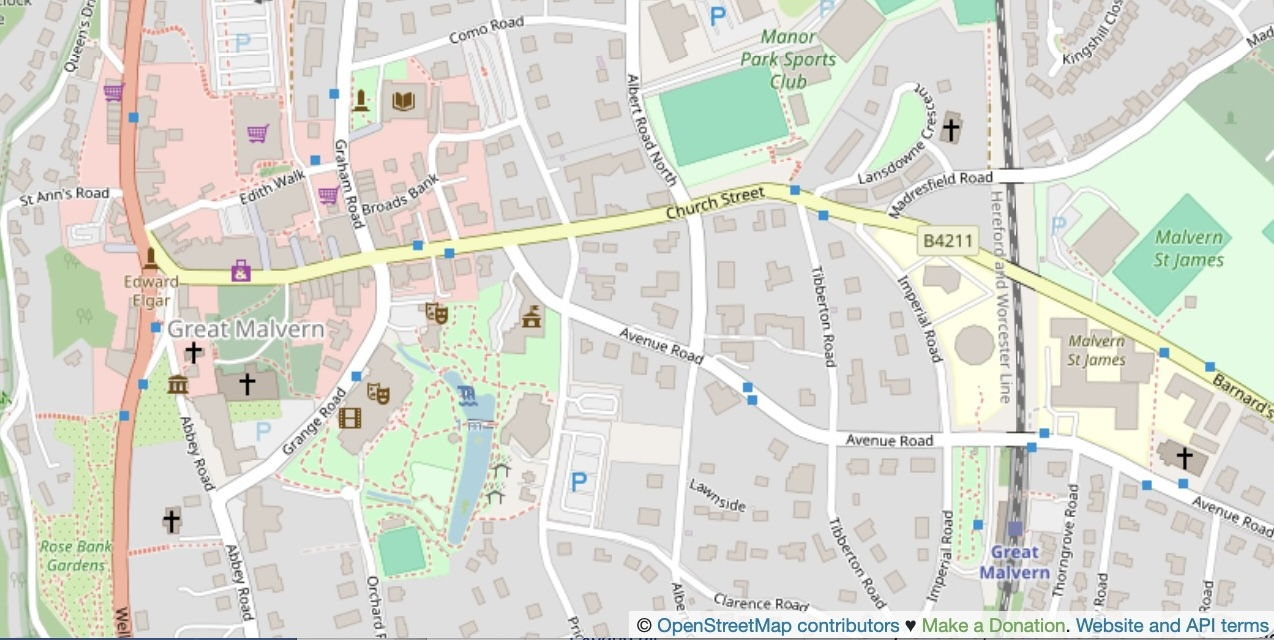
The area of Great Malvern within the town of Malvern

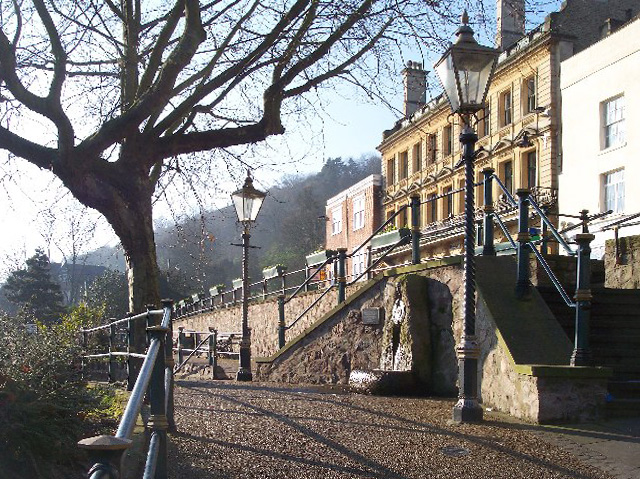
Malvhina Fountain on Belle Vue Island not far from Elgar's statue and the Enigma Fountain

Great Malvern (/mɔːlvərn/) is an area of the civil parish of Malvern, in the Malvern Hills district, in the county of Worcestershire, England. It lies at the foot of the Malvern Hills, a designated Area of Outstanding Natural Beauty, on the eastern flanks of the Worcestershire Beacon and North Hill, and is the historic centre of Malvern and includes its town centre.

It is a designated conservation area in recognition of the special architectural and historic interest of the area. The growth of Great Malvern began with the founding of an 11th-century priory. During the 19th century, it became a popular centre for hydrotherapy and swelled to include the bordering settlements of Barnards Green, Malvern Link with Link Top, Malvern Wells (South Malvern), North Malvern, and West Malvern. This urban area, along with the hills they surround and several villages, are collectively referred to as The Malverns.

Great Malvern is a seat of local government, being the location of the headquarters of Malvern Town Council, the Malvern Hills Conservators and Malvern Hills AONB Partnership, and Malvern Hills District Council. It has many of the town's amenities including the Malvern Theatres complex, the Priory Park, the Splash leisure and swimming complex, the main library, the police station, the tourist information centre, and the main post office.

== Location ==
Great Malvern is approximately 8 miles (13 km) south-west of the city of Worcester, on the eastern slopes of the Malvern Hills. The steep elevation of the town ranges from about 50 to 200 metres (164 to 656 feet) above sea level. The River Severn runs roughly north-south about 4 miles (6.4 km) to the east of the town.

Belle Vue Island (a public terraced garden on an "island" between roads) is the finishing point for the Worcestershire Way, a waymarked long-distance trail that runs 31 miles (50 km) from Bewdley to Great Malvern.

== Town centre ==
The town centre comprises two main streets at right angles to each other in a 'T': the steep Church Street and Bellevue Terrace, a relatively flat north–south extension of the A449 which forms Malvern's western extremity along the flank of the hills. In the heart of the town is a statue of the composer Edward Elgar, while other statuary is dedicated to Malvern water.

Among the many shops are two large modern supermarkets, both in Edith Walk, formerly a steep and unmade lane that served the rear entrances of the shops in Church Street. As well as traditional high street shops such as butchers, bakers, grocers etc., there are also cafés, bookshops, health food shops, art and craft shops, galleries, antique dealers, delis, restaurants, complementary therapists, charity shops, law firms, and estate agents. There is also a public library that includes access to many community services. On the Worcester to Hereford railway line is the Victorian Great Malvern station, a listed example of classical Victorian railway architecture close to the nearby former Imperial Hotel by the same architect, E. W. Elmslie.

There are many specimens of mature trees in Great Malvern. When Lady Foley, the widow of Edward Thomas Foley, sold off parts of her estate in the 1800s, she stipulated that all plots around the town centre should be planted with trees.

== History ==
=== Toponymy ===
The name Malvern is first attested in a charter of around 1030, as Mælfern, and then in the Domesday Book of 1086 as Malferna. The name derives from the Common Brittonic words that survive in modern Welsh as moel ("bare") and bryn ("hill"); thus it once meant "bare hill". The name perhaps applied originally to the hill now called Worcester Beacon, after which Great Malvern was then named. Additions corresponding to the Great part of Great Malvern, made to distinguish the settlement from Little Malvern, are first attested in 1228 (Magna Malverna, using the Latin word for "great") and 1521 (Moche Malv'ne, using the English word much). Great Malvern in turn then gave its name to the whole range of hills beside which it lies, the Malvern Hills.

Before the beginning of academic place-name studies, the name attracted some fanciful explanations. William of Malmesbury's Gesta Pontificum suggests that the name comes from the Latin words male ("badly") and vernat ("flourishes"), implying that it meant "thrives poorly" and that this was used ironically because spiritual life in Malvern was so successful. Jabez Allies, a nineteenth-century antiquarian from Worcestershire, speculated that -vern derived from supposed Brittonic words sarn or varn meaning "pavement" or "seat of judgement".

=== Monastic Malvern ===
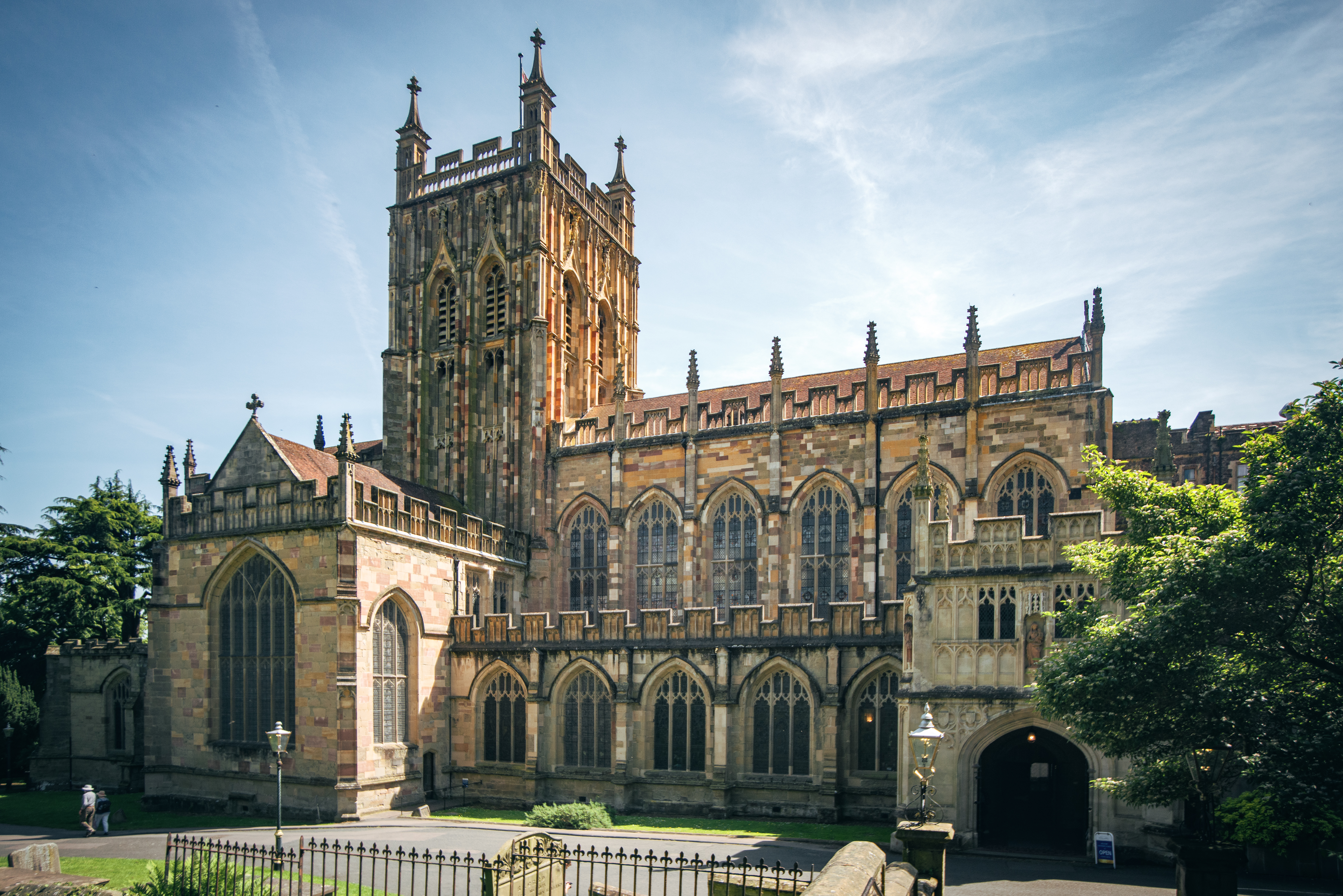

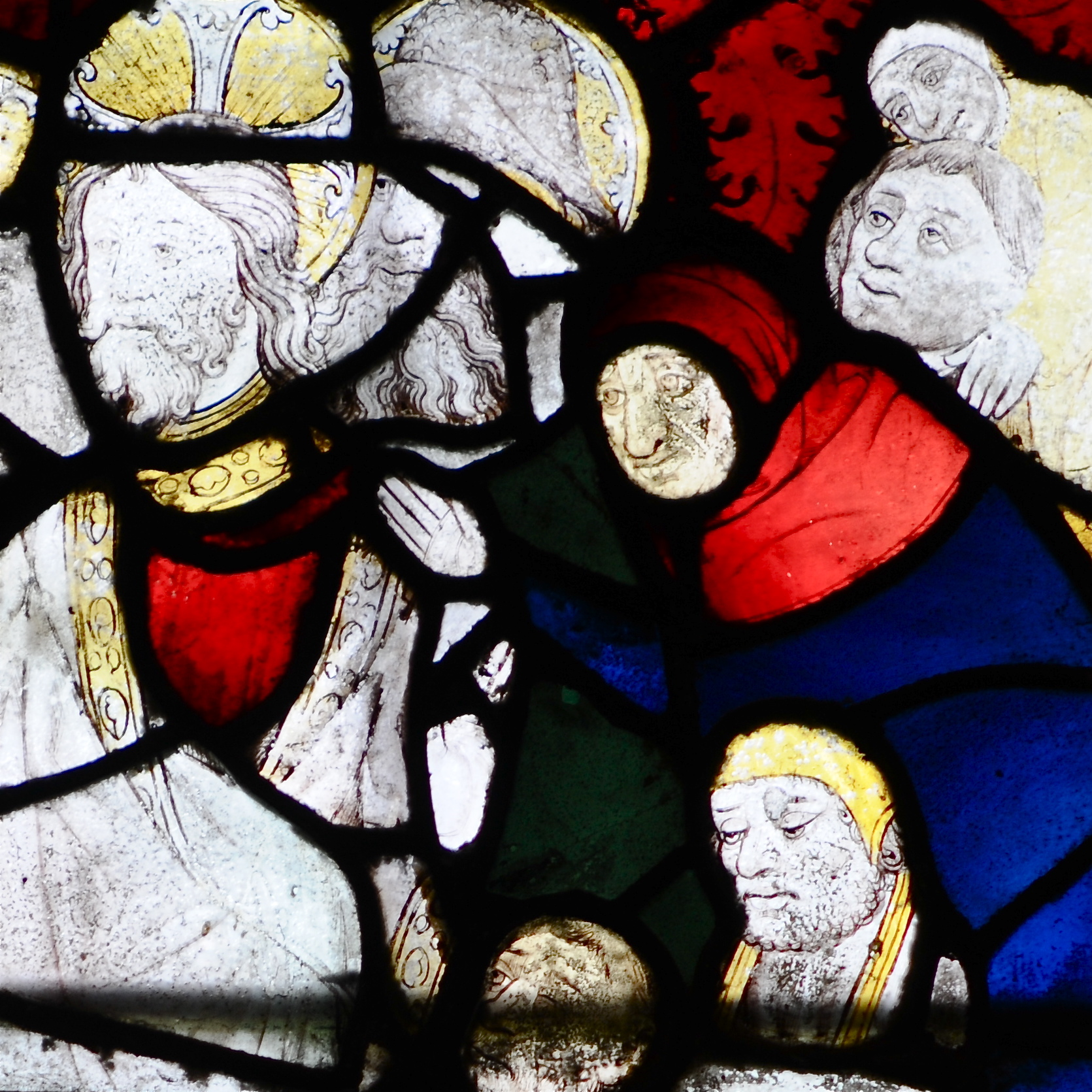
Medieval stained glass windows at Great Malvern Priory

The town developed around its 11th-century priory, a Benedictine monastery, the remains of which make up some of the early parts of Great Malvern Priory, now a large parish church. Several slightly different histories explain the actual founding of the religious community. Legend tells that the settlement began following the murder of St. Werstan, a monk of Deerhurst, who escaped and fled through the Malvern Chase, finding sanctuary on the Malvern Hills and establishing a hermitage near St. Ann's Well. St Werstan's oratory is thought to have been located on the site of St Michael's Chapel, which is believed to have stood on the site of Bello Sguardo, a Victorian Villa. Bello Sguardo was built on the site of Hermitage Cottage. The cottage was demolished in 1825 and ecclesiastical carvings were found within it. An undercroft from the Middle Ages with human bones and parts of a coffin were also uncovered. Although the legend may be monastic mythology, historians have however concluded that St. Werstan was the original martyr. The first prior was Aldwyn, who founded the monastery on his bishop's advice, and by 1135 the monastery included thirty monks. Aldwyn was succeeded by Walcher of Malvern, an astronomer and philosopher from Lorraine, whose gravestone inside the priory church records details that the priory arose in 1085 from a hermitage endowed by Edward the Confessor. An ancient stained glass window in the Priory church depicts the legend of St. Werstan, with details of his vision, the consecration of his chapel, Edward the Confessor granting the charter for the site, and Werstan's martyrdom.

An 18th-century document states that in the 18th year of William's kingship (probably 1083), a priory was dedicated to St Mary the Virgin. Victoria County History describes how a hermit Aldwyn, who lived in the reign of Edward the Confessor, had petitioned the Earl of Gloucester for the original site (of the Priory) in the wood, and cites his source as "Gervase of Canterbury, Mappa Mundi (Rolls ser.)".

Large estates in Malvern were part of crown lands given to Gilbert "the Red", the seventh Earl of Gloucester and sixth Earl of Hertford, on his marriage to Joan of Acre the daughter of Edward I, in 1290. Disputed hunting rights on these led to several armed conflicts with Humphrey de Bohun, 3rd Earl of Hereford, that Edward resolved. Nott states that Gilbert made gifts to the Priory, and describes his "great conflict" with Thomas de Cantilupe, Bishop of Hereford, also about hunting rights and a ditch that Gilbert dug, that was settled by costly litigation. Gilbert had a similar conflict with Godfrey Giffard, Bishop and Administrator of Worcester Cathedral (and formerly Chancellor of England. Godfrey, who had granted land to the Priory, had jurisdictional disputes about Malvern Priory, resolved by Robert Burnell, the current Chancellor.

A discussion in 2005 about the stained glass windows of Great Malvern Priory in terms of the relationship between Church and Laity stresses the importance of Malvern in the development of stained glass. It refers to "the vast and strategically important estates of which Malvern was a part" in the 15th and 16th centuries, to a widespread awareness of Great Malvern Priory, to the likelihood of a pilgrimage route through the town. The discussion also mentions Thomas Walsingham's view that Malvern was a hiding place of the Lollard knight Sir John Oldcastle in 1414. Chambers wrote, in relation to the stained glass, "the situation of Malvern was so much admired by Henry VII, his Queen (Elizabeth of York) and their two Sons, Prince Arthur, and Prince Henry" that they made substantial endowments.

=== Post dissolution ===
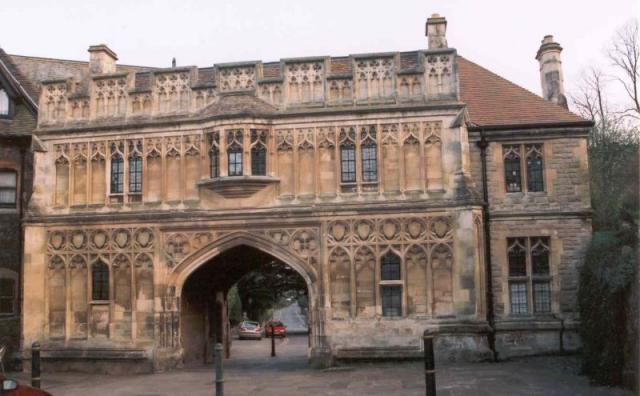
The Abbey Gateway in the town centre is now the home of the Malvern Museum

During the Dissolution of the monasteries the local commissioners were instructed to ensure that, where abbey churches were also used for parish worship, they should continue or could be purchased by parishioners. Accordingly, Malvern Priory survived by being acquired by a William Pinnocke and with it, much of its 15th-century stained glass windows. The monastic buildings were taken apart and anything usable was sold off. With the exception of the church building (of which the south transept adjoining the monastery's cloisters was destroyed), all that remains of Malvern's monastery is the Abbey Gateway (also known as the Priory Gatehouse) that houses today's Malvern Museum.

=== Development as a spa (17th–19th centuries) ===
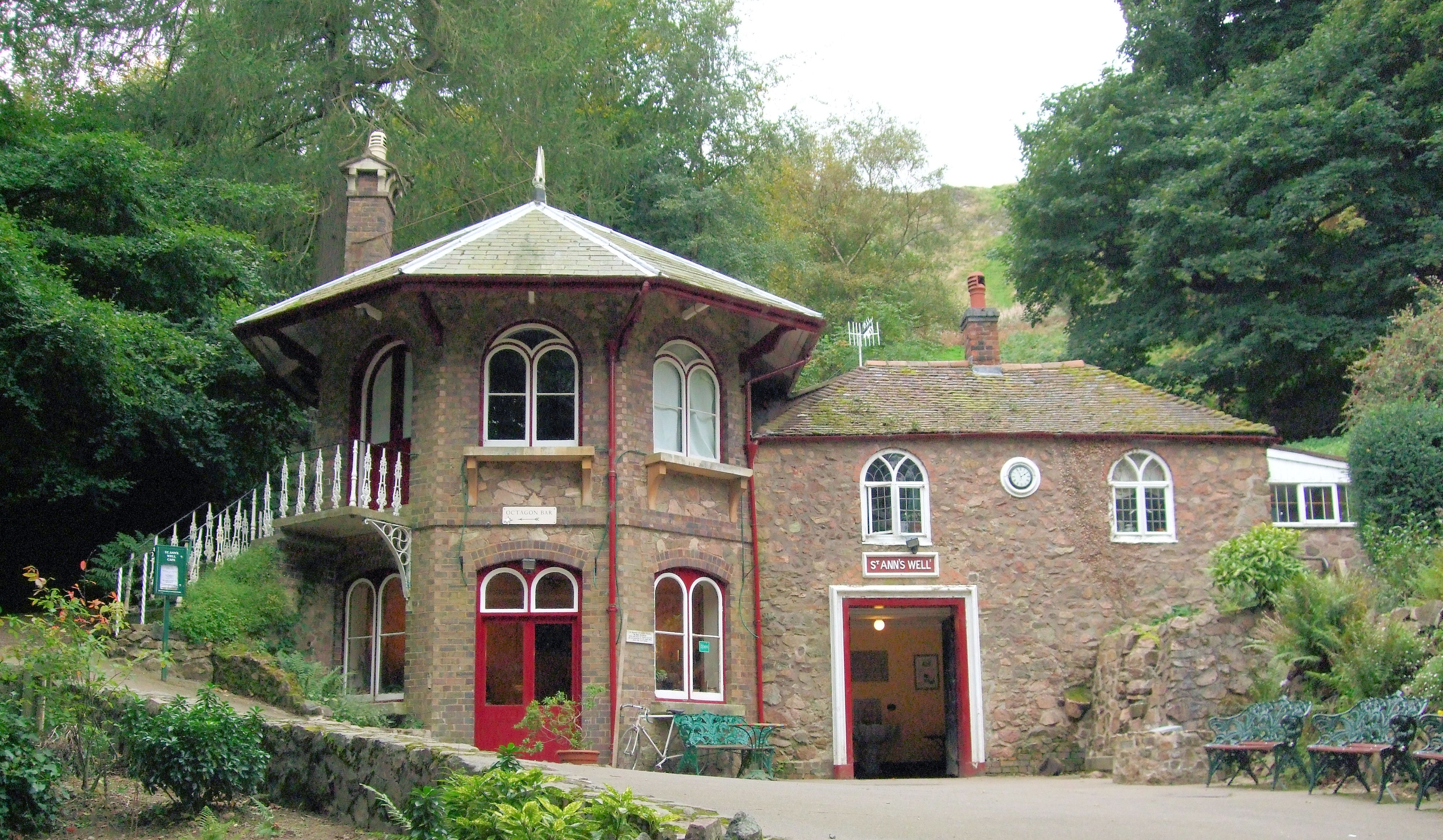
St. Ann's Well, a popular café for walkers on the hills. The building on the right houses the spout from which the water surges into a basin.

The health-giving properties of Malvern water and the natural beauty of the surroundings led to the development of Malvern as a spa, with resources for invalids and for tourists, seeking cures, rest and entertainment. Local legend has it that the curative benefit of the spring water was known in mediaeval times. The medicinal value and the bottling of Malvern water are mentioned "in a poem attributed to the Reverend Edmund Rea, who became Vicar of Great Malvern in 1612". Richard Banister, the pioneering oculist, wrote about the Eye Well, close to the Holy Well, in a short poem in his Breviary of the Eyes (see Malvern water), in 1622. In 1756, Dr. John Wall published a 14-page pamphlet on the benefits of Malvern water, that reached a 158-page 3rd edition in 1763. Further praise came from the botanist Benjamin Stillingfleet in 1757, the poet Thomas Warton in 1790, and William Addison, the physician of the Duchess of Kent (mother of Queen Victoria) in 1828, all quoted in a review by the medical historian W.H. McMenemy. In his lecture about Malvern at the Royal Institution, Addison spoke of "its pure and invigorating air, the excellence of its water, and the romantic beauty of its scenery". Similar views appeared in the press, Nicholas Vansittart brought his wife Catherine to Malvern for a rest cure in 1809. Chambers, in his book about Malvern, praised Elizabeth, Countess Harcourt (daughter-in-law of the 1st Earl Harcourt), whose patronage contributed to the development of hillside walks.

Bottling and shipping of the Malvern water grew in volume. In 1842, Dr. James Wilson and Dr. James Manby Gully, leading exponents of hydrotherapy, set up clinics in Malvern (Holyrood House for women and Tudor House for men). Malvern expanded rapidly as a residential spa. Several large hotels and many of the large villas in Malvern date from its heyday. Many smaller hotels and guest houses were built between about 1842 and 1875. By 1855 there were already 95 hotels and boarding houses and by 1865 over a quarter of the town's 800 houses were boarding and lodging houses. Most were in Great Malvern, the town centre, while others were in the surrounding settlements of Malvern Wells, Malvern Link, North Malvern and West Malvern.

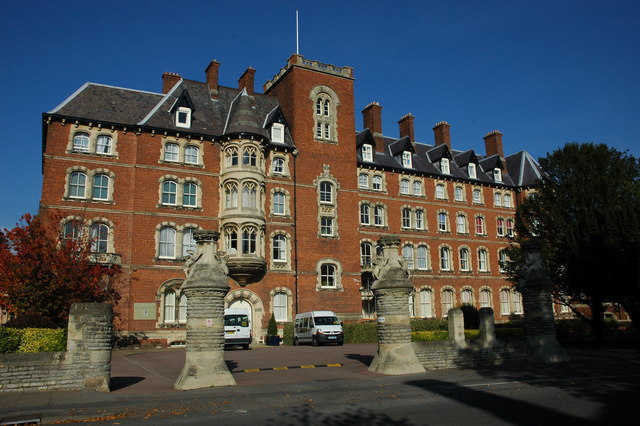
Malvern St James (formerly the Imperial Hotel)

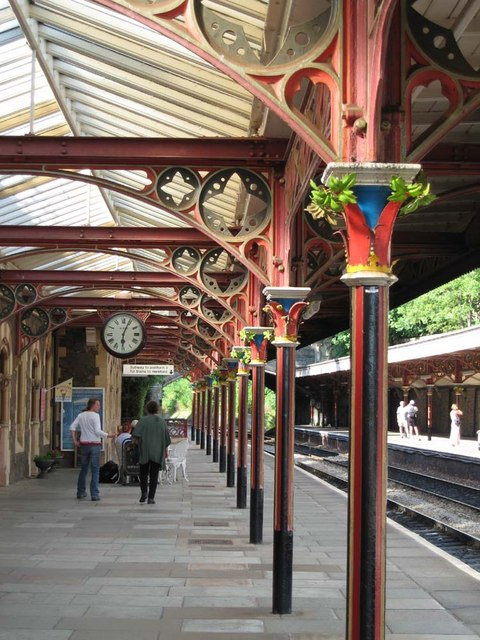
Great Malvern railway station

Queen Adelaide visited St. Ann's Well in September 1842. "Throughout the 1840s and 1850s Malvern attracted a stream of celebrated visitors, including royalty." Patients included Charles Darwin, Catherine, wife of Charles Dickens, Thomas Carlyle, Florence Nightingale, Lord Lytton, who was an outspoken protagonist, Lord Tennyson and Samuel Wilberforce. The hydrotherapists came under heavy criticism from Sir Charles Hastings (a founder of the British Medical Association) and other physicians.

The extension of the railway from Worcester to Malvern Link was completed on 25 May 1859. The following year, "Besides middle class visitors ... the railway also brought working class excursionists from the Black Country with dramatic effect ... At Whitsuntide ... 10,000 came from the Black Country to the newly opened stations at Great Malvern and Malvern Wells. Throughout June to September, day trips were frequent, causing the "town to be crowded with 'the most curious specimens of the British shopkeeper and artisan on an outing' ". Following Malvern's new-found fame as a spa and area of natural beauty, and fully exploiting its new rail connections, factories from as far as Manchester were organising day trips for their employees, often attracting as many as 5,000 visitors a day. In 1865, a public meeting of residents denounced the rising rail fares – by then twice that of other lines – that were exploiting the tourism industry, and demanded a limitation to the number of excursion trains. The arrival of the railway also enabled the delivery of coal in large quantities, which accelerated the area's popularity as a winter resort.

The 1887 Baedeker's includes Malvern in a London–Worcester–Hereford itinerary and described as "an inland health resort, famous for its bracing air and pleasant situation" and "a great educational centre", with five hotels that are "well spoken of", a commercial hotel, the Assembly Rooms and Gardens, and many excursions on foot, pony and by carriage. Other descriptions of the diversions mention bands, quadrilles, cricket (residents vs visitors) and billiard rooms. The Duchess of Teck stayed, with her daughter Mary (later queen consort of George V), in Great Malvern in the Autumn of 1891, joined by Lady Eva Greville. and the Duke of Teck. The Duchess was "perfectly enchanted with Malvern and its surroundings" and, with the Duke, visited Malvern College. The Duchess returned to open the new waterworks at Camp Hill in 1895. In 1897, the painter Edward Burne-Jones came to Great Malvern for the "bracing air", on the recommendation of his doctor, but stayed in his hotel for a week. The 7-year-old Franklin D. Roosevelt visited in 1889, during a trip to Europe with his parents.

Fearing that Malvern would become the "Metropolis of Hydrotherapy", a Malvern Hills Act had been secured in parliament in 1884 and later Acts empowered the Malvern Hills Conservators to acquire land to prevent further encroachment on common land and by 1925 they had bought much of the manorial wastelands.

Towards the end of the 19th century, the popularity of the hydrotherapy had declined to the extent that many hotels were already being converted into private boarding schools and rest homes, and education became the basis of Malvern's economy. By 1865, the town already had 17 single-gender private schools, increasing to 25 by 1885. The area was well suited for schools due to its established attractive environment and access by rail. Children could travel unaccompanied with their trunks by rail to their boarding schools near the stations in Great Malvern, Malvern Wells, and Malvern Link. The Girls College, in a former hotel directly opposite Great Malvern railway station, has a dedicated (now derelict) tunnel to the basement of the building, which is clearly visible from both platforms of the station.

== Governance ==
In 1900 the former urban districts and towns of Great Malvern and Malvern Link were merged and the area forms the current six (parish) wards that constitute the civil parish of Malvern, which has a town council (based in Great Malvern). In 1951 the parish of Great Malvern had a population of 9954. On 1 April 1974 the parish was abolished. As Great Malvern is no longer an area with an administratively defined boundary, it straddles the wards of Priory and (to small extents) Pickersleigh and Chase.

The other tiers of local government that cover Great Malvern are Malvern Hills District Council (also based in Great Malvern) and Worcestershire County Council (based in Worcester).

== Culture and leisure ==
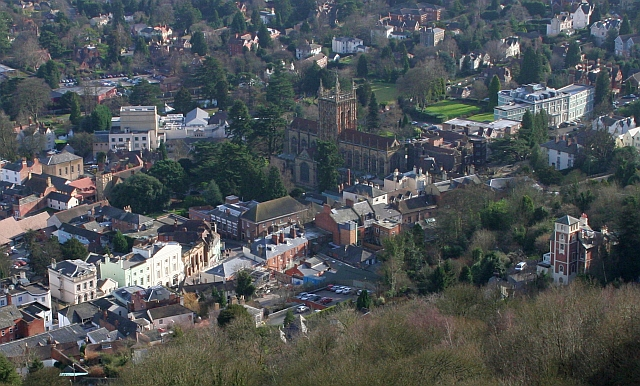
The town centre with the prominent priory church

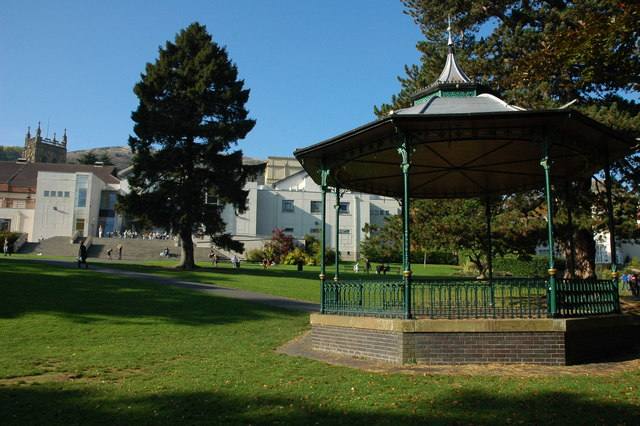
Priory Park with Malvern Theatres complex and Priory Church tower in the background

The Priory Park with its adjoining Malvern Splash pool and Winter Gardens occupies a large area in the centre of the town. The Winter Gardens complex is home to the Malvern Theatres, a leading provincial centre for dramatic arts, a cinema (film theatre), a concert venue/banqueting room, bars and cafeterias.

For almost half a century, the Malvern Winter Gardens has also been a major regional venue for classical music, and concerts by legendary rock bands of the 1960s, 1970s and 1980s.

The Splash Leisure Complex flanks the eastern boundary of Priory Park and has an indoor swimming pool and gymnasium.

Located between the former community hospital and the Malvern Hills College are the grounds and buildings of the Manor Park Club Multi Sports Complex that provides the Malvern area with extensive indoor and outdoor sports facilities. It is assisted by grants and loans from various bodies, including the Malvern Hills District Council, the Sport of England (Lottery) and the Lawn Tennis Association.

=== Drama ===
Malvern Theatres, housed in the Winter Gardens complex in the town centre, is a provincial centre for the arts. The first Malvern Drama Festival, which took place in 1929, was dedicated to Bernard Shaw and planned by Sir Barry Jackson. A number of works have had their first performances at Malvern, six by Shaw including In Good King Charles' Golden Days, the 1929 English première of The Apple Cart, and the world première of Geneva in 1938. In 1956 Malvern held a Shaw centenary week. In February 1965 a Malvern Festival Theatre Trust was set up, and extensive refurbishment was undertaken. J B Priestley presided over the opening ceremony of the first summer season. In 1998, a further £7.2 million major redesign and refurbishment took place with the help of contributions from the National Lottery Distribution Fund (NLDF), administered by the government Department for Culture, Media and Sport.

The Theatre of Small Convenience entered the Guinness Book of World Records in 2002 as the smallest theatre in the world. Located in a former Victorian public convenience in the centre of the town in Edith Walk in, the theatre has a capacity of 12 people. The theatre regularly hosts puppetry, professional and amateur actors, drama, poetry, storytelling and opera, and has become a regular venue of the Malvern Fringe Festival. The theatre has hosted a range of famous actors over the years including Simon Callow, Nicholas Hoult and Jane Asher.

=== Literature ===
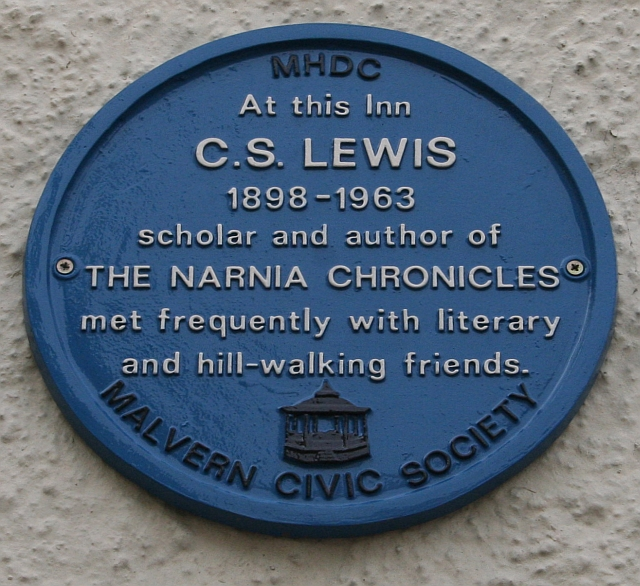
C.S. Lewis Plaque on the Unicorn Inn

William Langland's famous 14th century poem The Visions of Piers Plowman (1362) was inspired by the Malvern Hills and the earliest poetic allusion to them occurs in the poem And on a Maye mornynge on Malverne hylles. Langland, was possibly educated at the priory of Great Malvern.

C. S. Lewis and J. R. R. Tolkien are among the authors that have frequented Malvern. Legend states that, after drinking in a Malvern pub one winter evening, they were walking home when it started to snow. They saw a lamp post shining out through the snow and Lewis turned to his friends and said "that would make a very nice opening line to a book". The novel The Lion, the Witch and the Wardrobe by Lewis later used that image as the characters enter the realm of Narnia. J.R.R. Tolkien found inspiration in the Malvern landscape which he had viewed from his childhood home in Birmingham and his brother Hilary's home near Evesham. He was introduced to the area by C. S. Lewis, who had brought him here to meet George Sayer, the Head of English at Malvern College. Sayer had been a student of Lewis, and became his biographer, and together with them Tolkien would walk the Malvern Hills. Recordings of Tolkien reading excerpts from The Hobbit and The Lord of the Rings were made in Malvern in 1952, at the home of George Sayer. The recordings were later issued on long-playing gramophone records. In the liner notes for J.R.R Tolkien Reads and Sings his The Hobbit & The Fellowship of the Rings, George Sayer wrote that Tolkien would relive the book as they walked and compared parts of the Malvern Hills to the White Mountains of Gondor.

Great Malvern is the setting for several episodes in Jonathan Coe's 2004 novel The Closed Circle.

=== Architecture ===
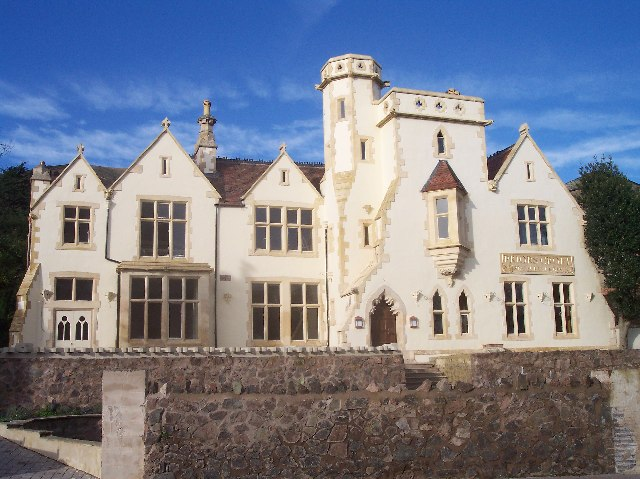
Prior's Croft, Grange Road (Victorian Gothic architecture)

In 1969 Great Malvern was designated a Conservation Area by the Local Authority in recognition of the architecture which includes Stuccoed, Classical, Victorian, Regency, Edwardian, Gothic Revival and Italianate styled buildings. Many of the houses were built during the Industrial Revolution, and Malvern's boom years as a spa town, by wealthy families from the nearby Birmingham area. Following the collapse of the spa industry, many of the hotels and villas became schools, and some have since been further converted to apartments, while some of the smaller hotels are now retirement homes. The Imperial Hotel in red brick with stone dressings, which later became a school, is one of the largest buildings in Malvern. It was built in 1860 by the architect E. W. Elmslie who also designed the Great Malvern railway station, and the Council House on the plot where Dr. Gully's original house stood. The Grove in Avenue Road in 1867, originally to be his private residence in 1927 became part of the Lawnside School for girls, and in 1860 Whitbourne Hall, a Grade II* listed building, in Herefordshire. The Imperial was the first hotel to be lit by incandescent gas. It was equipped with all types of baths and brine was brought specially by rail from Droitwich.

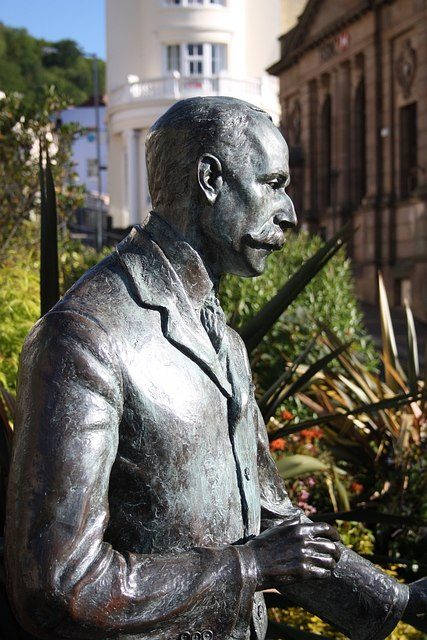
Sir Edward Elgar, Belle Vue Island, Great Malvern

Much architecture and statuary in the town centre is dedicated to Malvern water, including the St Ann's Well, which is housed in a building dating from 1813. The drinking spout, Malvhina, by the sculptor Rose Garrard, was unveiled on 4 September 1998. The Enigma Fountain, also by Garrard, was unveiled by the then Duke of York (later Andrew Mountbatten-Windsor) in 2000.

=== Music ===
Sir Edward Elgar, British composer and Master of the King's Musick, lived much of his life around Malvern and is buried in Little Malvern Roman Catholic churchyard. A sculpture group by artist Rose Garrard comprising the Enigma fountain together with a statue of Elgar gazing over Great Malvern stands on Belle Vue Terrace in the town centre. The Elgar Route, a 40-mile (64 km) drive passing some key landmarks from Elgar's life, passes through Malvern.

Malvern Concert Club, founded in 1903 by Elgar, holds concerts are held in the Forum Theatre, Malvern Theatres. Its programmes focus on in renaissance, baroque, classical, romantic and contemporary music.

In the 1960s, 1970s and 1980s, the Malvern Winter Gardens was a major regional venue for concerts by popular rock bands, including T-Rex, The Jam, AC/DC, Black Sabbath, The Undertones, and Joy Division. Many of the events were promoted by Cherry Red, a London-based independent record label formed in 1978.

The Chandos Symphony Orchestra, under the professional direction of Michael Lloyd, has over 100 players. It specialises in performances of major works of the 19th and 20th Centuries. The Autumn in Malvern Festival is an annual event featuring performances of artists of music, poetry, writers and film makers held during October every year. The Colwell and other brass bands of the early century were part of the music of the town. The opera singer Jenny Lind lived and died in Malvern, and is buried in Great Malvern cemetery. Julius Harrison (1885–1963), who was a contemporary of Elgar and Professor of Composition at the Royal Academy of Music, lived in Pickersleigh Road for most of the 1940s. He was music director at Malvern College and director of the early Elgar Festivals in Malvern.

Malvern Fringe Festival was officially founded in 1977 as a reaction to the Malvern Festival which was perceived to be biased towards classical music and appealing towards a national and international audience rather than a local one. It takes place over three days in June as a fringe to the Elgar Festival. The Fringe also organise the Malvern May Day and Parade, an annual community event which has been held in Priory Park on the Saturday before the May Bank Holiday since 1993 and various musical and other live events throughout the year. The Fringe aims to be inclusive; bridging the generation gap by providing a varied programme of events for the local people of Malvern aimed at all ages.

=== Art ===
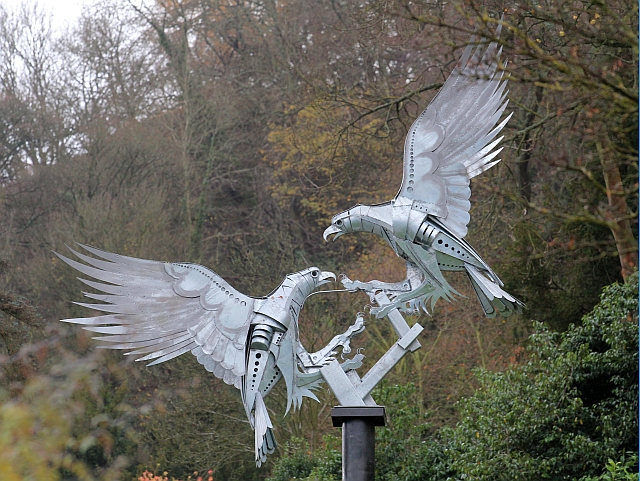
The Diamond Jubilee sculpture (detail) in Rosebank Gardens by Walenty Pytel

Works of art in Great Malvern include fountains, statues, and Malvern water spouts by the sculptor Rose Garrard. Among her sculptures are the statue of Sir Edward Elgar and the Enigma Fountain (unveiled by the then Prince Andrew, Duke of York on Belle Vue Terrace, Malvern on 26 May 2000). and the drinking spout, Malvhina, also on Belle Vue Terrace, which was unveiled on 4 September 1998.

A sculpture of two buzzards by Walenty Pytel was installed in Rosebank Gardens, Great Malvern to commemorate the Queen's Diamond Jubilee in November 2012.

Paintings of Great Malvern include Joseph Powell's Great Malvern Priory ... from the North East (1797), now in the British Watercolours collection of the Victoria and Albert Museum and J. M. W. Turner's Porch of Great Malvern Abbey.

=== Television ===
Elgar, a drama documentary made in 1962 by the British director Ken Russell, was filmed on location in Malvern and Worcester. Several scenes were filmed in Malvern at locations including the Bluebird Tea Rooms in Church Street and St Ann's Well in Great Malvern. Made for BBC Television's long-running Monitor programme, it dramatised the life of the composer Edward Elgar. The film significantly raised the public profile of the composer.

Great Malvern railway station featured in 1975 as the commuter-belt railway station in the first episode of Survivors, the post-apocalyptic fiction drama television series created by Terry Nation and produced by Terence Dudley at the BBC.

== Education ==

In the late 19th and early 20th centuries following the decline in Malvern's popularity as a spa town, many private boarding schools were established in Great Malvern, often occupying the premises of former hotels and large villas. Two large independent 'public' schools – Malvern College for boys and girls and Malvern St James for girls – now remain following mergers of Malvern's many private primary and secondary schools.

Malvern College is a coeducational public school, founded in 1865. Until 1992, it was a school for boys aged 13 to 18. Following a series of mergers from 1992 to 2008 with private primary schools in the area it has become coeducational with pupils from 3 to 18 years old. Among its alumni are two Nobel Laureates (James Meade and Francis William Aston), an Olympic Gold medallist (Arnold Jackson), and leading politicians.

Malvern St James was formed in 2006 by the merger of Malvern Girls' College and St. James' School, West Malvern (formerly St James' and The Abbey) and other mergers with local private schools over the last thirty years. It is now the last of the independent girls' schools in the Malvern area. The main building of Malvern St James on the campus of the former Malvern Girls' College is the former Imperial Hotel, built in the second half of the 19th century.

There are several state-controlled or voluntary-assisted primary schools in the Great Malvern area. Secondary schools serving the area are located in the suburbs of Barnards Green, Malvern Link, and the nearby village of Hanley Castle, and further afield in the city of Worcester.

== Transport ==
=== Rail ===
Great Malvern railway station is located just off Avenue Road, 0.5 miles (0.80 km) downhill from the priory church and town centre, and provides direct services to Worcester, Hereford, Bristol, Westbury, Weymouth, Birmingham, Oxford and London.

=== Bus ===
Several local bus services connect Great Malvern with the surrounding area.

=== Air ===
The nearest major airport is Birmingham approximately one hour by road via the M5 and M42 motorways. Gloucestershire Airport located at Staverton, in the borough of Tewkesbury is a busy general aviation airport used mainly for private charter and scheduled flights to destinations such as the islands of Jersey, Guernsey, and the Isle of Man, pilot training, and by the aircraft of emergency services.

== Notable people ==
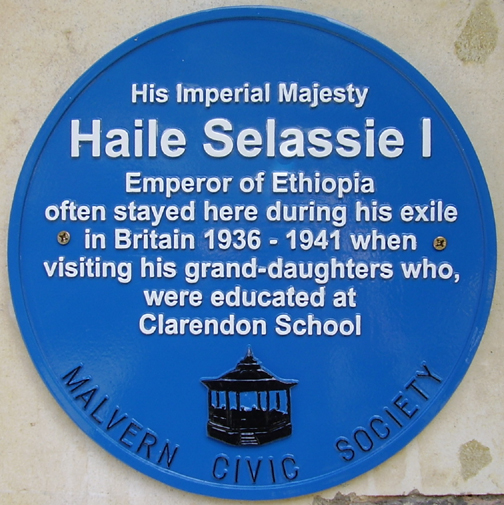
Blue plaque commemorating Haile Selassie's stay at the Abbey Hotel in Great Malvern

- Thomas Attwood (1783–1856), Liberal politician and economist, died at Great Malvern.
- Robert Conquest (1917–2015), Anglo-American historian and recipient of the Presidential Medal of Freedom (2005); born in Great Malvern
- Anne Darwin, Charles Darwin's daughter, is buried in the graveyard of Malvern Priory.
- Edward Elgar, composer, taught in Great Malvern. He is buried, along with a number of relatives, in the graveyard of nearby St Wulstan's Roman Catholic Church.
- Haile Selassie, emperor of Ethiopia, visited Malvern during his 1936–1941 exile, staying at the Abbey Hotel.
- Jenny Lind, opera singer, lived and died in Malvern, and is buried in Great Malvern cemetery.
- Franklin D. Roosevelt, later President of the USA, stayed at the Aldwyn Tower Hotel in St Ann's Road, Great Malvern, while convalescing from an illness at the age of 7.
- Cher Lloyd, singer, was born and lived in Malvern.
- Jacqui Smith, former Labour Home Secretary, was born and lives in Malvern.
