= Malvern water =

Natural spring water from the Malvern Hills

Coordinates: 52.098913°N 2.337341°W

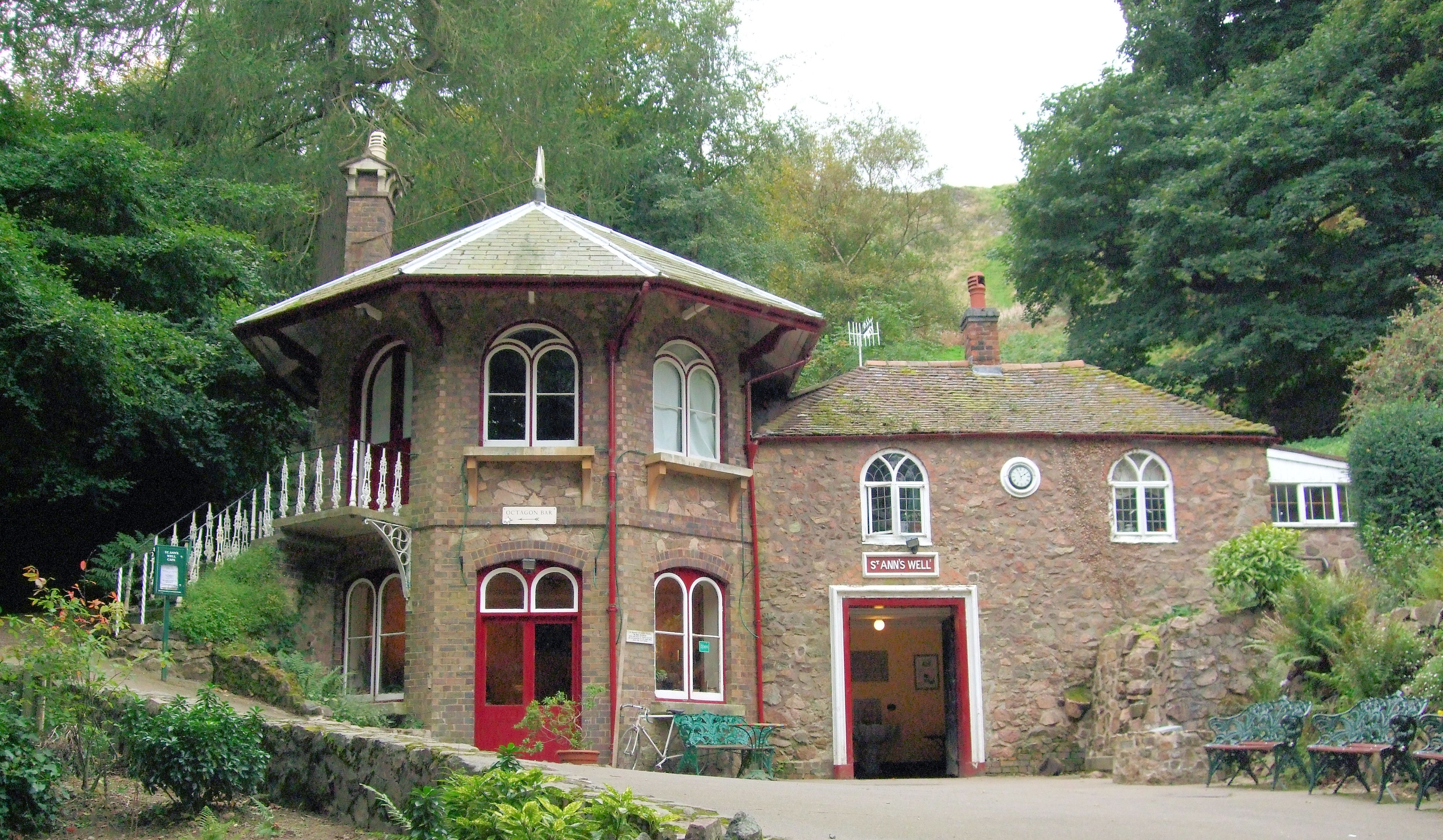
St. Ann's Well, Malvern, a popular café for walkers on the hills. The building on the right houses the spout from which the water surges into a basin.

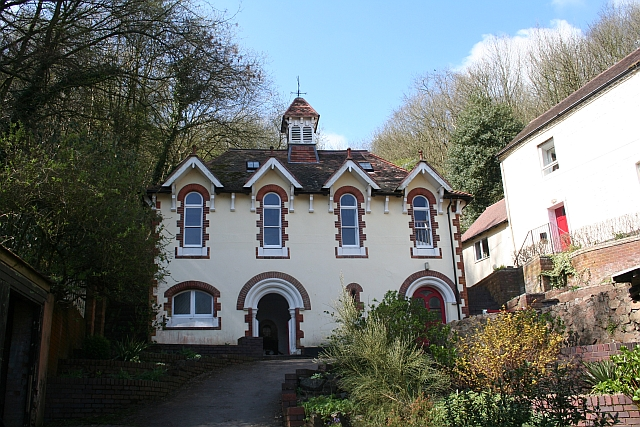
The Holy Well, where the water was first bottled on a commercial scale. The well is believed to be the oldest bottling plant in the world, and now bottles under the name Holywell Spring Water.

Malvern water is a natural spring water from the Malvern Hills on the border of the counties of Herefordshire and Worcestershire in England. The Hills consist of very hard granite and limestone rock. Fissures in the rock retain rain water, which slowly permeates through, escaping at the springs. The springs release an average of about 60 litres a minute and the flow has never been known to cease.

Beneficial properties of the water have been reported for over 400 years, and the reason for such benefits was a topic of scholarly discussion by 1817. In the 19th century Malvern became famous for the water cure, resulting in its rapid development from a village to a busy town with many large Victorian and Edwardian hotels. The writings of the hydrotherapists James Gully and James Wilson, and well known patients who included Lord Lytton contributed to Malvern's renown at that time. The water was bottled on an industrial scale under the Schweppes brand from 1850 until 2010, and has been bottled by a family-owned company since 2009 as Holywell Malvern Spring Water. In 2012 the Holywell Water Co Ltd was granted permission to use the world-famous "Malvern" name in its branding, thus becoming Holywell Malvern Spring Water. It has been drunk by several British monarchs. Elizabeth I drank it in public in the 16th century; Queen Victoria refused to travel without it.

== Sources ==
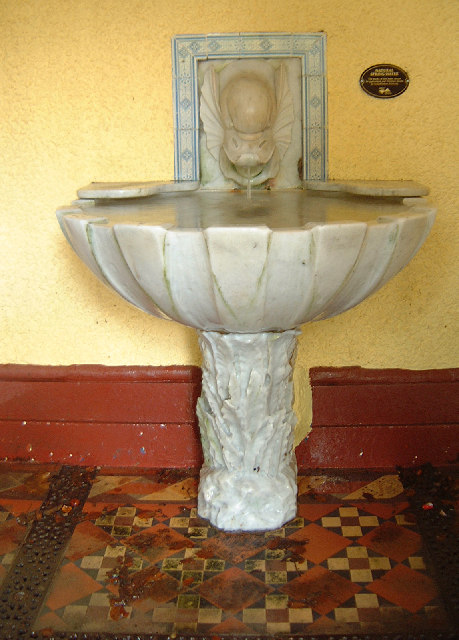
The spout at St Ann's Well

The quality of Malvern water is attributable to its source. Malvern Hills are amongst the oldest and hardest rocks in the UK, with their geology responsible for the quality of Malvern's spring water. The hills consist of Precambrian igneous and metamorphic rock, the oldest of which are about 670 million years old. The rocks are characterised by low porosity and high secondary permeability via fissures. Malvern water is rainwater and snow meltwater that percolates through fissures created by the pressures of tectonic movements about 300 million years ago when advancing sedimentary layers of Silurian shale and limestone were pushed into and under older Precambrian rock. When the fissures are saturated, a water table forms and the water emerges as springs around the fault lines between the strata. Depending on rainfall, the flow can vary from as little as 36 litres (8 gallons) per minute to over 350 litres (77 gallons) per minute. The water permeates the rock which, because of its hardness, leaves little or no mineral traces in the water, while at the same time the very fine cracks act as a filter for other impurities. Rainfall on the Malvern Hills is thought to be sufficient to account for all the water that runs out of the springs, reflected for example in some spring flows six to eight weeks after heavy rainfall, and in reduced flows after a dry period.

== Purity ==
Malvern water has long been acclaimed for its purity. In 1756 Dr John Wall tested the water, found that it contained very few minerals, and said: "The Malvern water is famous for containing just nothing at all...!" William Heberden also noted the purity of Malvern water, stating "the Malvern water is purer than that of any other springs in England, which I ever examined or heard of".

The natural untreated water is generally devoid of all minerals, bacteria, and suspended matter, approaching the purity of distilled water. In 1987 Malvern gained official EU status as a natural mineral water, a mark of purity and quality. However, in spite of regular quality analysis, drought in 2006 dried out the rock that filters the water, allowing the water to flow through it too quickly for the natural filtering process. Due to the slight impurities, the Coca-Cola Company, bottler of the Schweppes brand, had to install filtration equipment, which reclassifies the water as spring water under EU law.

== Springs ==
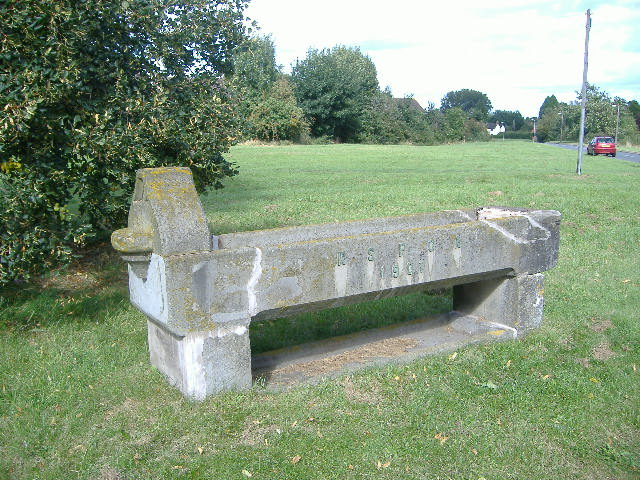
Barnards Green Trough was plumbed to receive Malvern water. According to its inscription, it is dedicated to the horses used by the military in World War I.

There are sources in about 70 locations around the Hills, where residents regularly fill containers free of charge, including the St Ann's Well, which is housed in a building dating from 1815, in the town of Great Malvern. Major popular water sources are:

- Beauchamp Fountain – Cowleigh Road
- Enigma Fountain plus Malvhina water feature, Belle Vue Terrace – town centre
- Evendine Spring – Jubilee Drive (west flank of the Hills)
- Hayslad Spring – West Malvern Road
- Holy Well – Malvern Wells
- Jubilee Fountain – Malvern Wells
- Morris Well, Wells Common – Lower Wyche
- St Ann's Well – Great Malvern

The Walms Well dating from around 250 BC is one of the earliest to be documented.

== Medicinal use ==
Local legend has it that the curative benefit of the spring water was known in mediaeval times. The medicinal value and the bottling of Malvern water are praised in verses 15 and 16 of "a poem attributed to the Reverend Edmund Rea, who became Vicar of Great Malvern in 1612". These are part of "an old song in praise of Malvern", that was published with comments on a different and uncertain provenance by Chambers in his history of the town.

To drink thy waters store, Lie in bushes
Many with ulcers sore; Many with bruises.
Who succour find from ill, By money given still
Thanks to the Christian will; O praise the Lord.
A thousand bottles here, were filled weekly,
And many costrils rare, for stomachs sickly;
Some were to London sent, Some of them into Kent,
Others on to Berwick went, O praise the Lord.

In 1622, Richard Banister, a pioneering oculist, wrote the following verse about the Eye Well, close to the Holy Well in his Breviary of the Eyes.

A little more I'll of their curing tell.
How they helped sore eyes with a new found well.
Great speech of Malvern Hills was late reported
Unto which spring people in troops resorted.

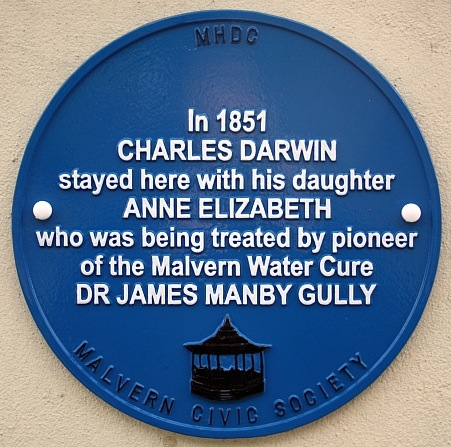
Charles Darwin stayed in Malvern. He hoped that the water would improve his daughter's health.

In 1756, Dr. John Wall published a 14-page pamphlet on the benefits of Malvern water, that reached a 158-page third edition in 1763. Further praise came from the botanist Benjamin Stillingfleet in 1757, the poet Thomas Warton in 1790, quoted in a review by the medical historian W. H. McMenemy. Cure tourism in Malvern got press mention. In a letter dated 18 July 1759 to Mrs Montague, Benjamin Stillingfleet wrote: "I have been at Malvern about twelve days, where, with difficulty, I have got a lodging, the place is so full, nor do I wonder at it, there being some instances of very extraordinary cures, in cases looked on as desperate, even by Dr. Wall, who first brought these waters into vogue ... The road is very fine, and made on purpose for the convenience of the drinkers". Chambers, in a footnote to the "song" quoted above, wrote "Though modern visitors do not now lie in bushes, yet so crowded was Malvern one season that a lady of rank and fashion, with her equipage and servants were actually obliged to be sent to the Workhouse. It is now the custom, during the season, to let out this house to visitors, and the money gained this way is applied to the funds for maintaining the poor." Nicholas Vansittart brought his wife Catherine to Malvern for a rest cure in 1809. In 1828, William Addison, the physician of the Duchess of Kent (mother of Queen Victoria) lectured about Malvern at the Royal Institution commending "its pure and invigorating air, the excellence of its water, and the romantic beauty of its scenery".

In 1842 Drs James Manby Gully and James Wilson opened water cure clinics at Malvern, thus beginning the town's prosperity. Based on the therapy offered at Vincent Priessnitz's clinic in Gräfenberg, Silesia, then part of the Austrian Empire (now in the Czech Republic), the centre was Britain's first purpose-built water cure establishment. As the fame of the establishment grew, Gully and Wilson became well-known national figures. Two more clinics were opened at Malvern. Famous patients included Charles Darwin's daughter (who died and is buried in Malvern), Thomas Carlyle, Florence Nightingale, Lord Tennyson, Samuel Wilberforce and Sir Edward Bulwer Lytton, whose writing contributed to the popularity of Malvern water. The fame of Gully and Wilson was not without detractors; Sir Charles Hastings, the founder of the British Medical Association, was extremely critical of hydropathy, and of Dr Gully in particular. The cure was satirized by "Dr. Oddfish".

== Commercialisation ==
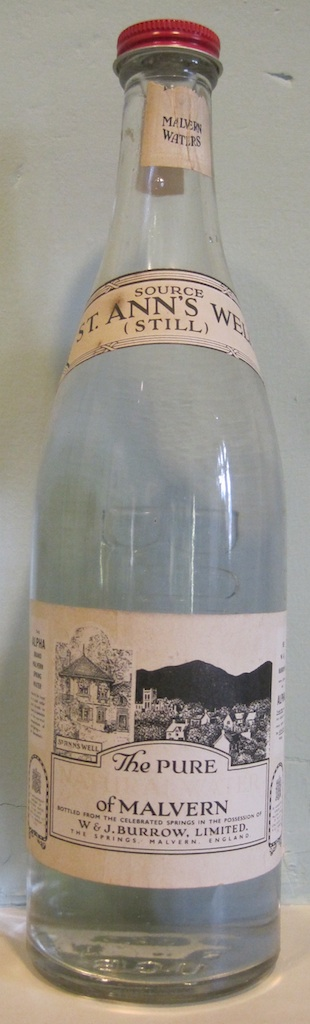
An early 20th-century Malvern Water (St Ann's Well) bottle

Malvern water has been bottled and distributed in the UK and abroad from as early as the reign of James I, with water bottling at the Holy Well being recorded in 1622. Various local grocers have bottled and distributed Malvern water during the 19th and early 20th centuries, but it was first bottled on a large commercial scale by Schweppes, who opened a bottling plant at Holywell in Malvern Wells in 1850. As official caterers to the Great Exhibition of 1851, Schweppes introduced the water as Malvern Soda, later renaming it Malvern Seltzer Water in 1856. In 1890 Schweppes moved away from Holywell, entered into a contract with a Colwall family, and built a bottling plant in the village in 1892. The Holywell was subsequently leased to John and Henry Cuff, who bottled there until the 1960s. The Holywell became derelict until 2009 when with the aid of a Lottery Heritage grant, production of 1200 bottles per day of Holywell Spring Water was recommenced by an independent family-owned company. The well is believed to be the oldest bottling plant in the world.

In the 1850s Malvern Water was bottled by John and William Burrow at the Bottling Works Spring in Robson Ward's yard on Belle Vue Terrace in Great Malvern. Bottling ceased there in the 1950s and the former bottling works are now furniture showrooms. Water for the Bottling Works Spring is piped from St Ann's Well.

In 1927, Schweppes acquired from the Burrows family Pewtress Spring, in Colwall, on the western side of the Herefordshire Beacon, approximately two miles from Colwall village. The source here emerges at the fault line between the Silurian thrust and the Precambrian diorite and granite above it. The spring was renamed Primeswell Spring, and in 1929 Schweppes commenced bottling. The factory employed 25 people who filled 26 million bottles annually. It was operated by Coca-Cola Enterprises Ltd., and the water was sold under the Schweppes brand name. On 20 October 2010 Coca-Cola Enterprises, who owned the Malvern brand, announced that production would be ceasing as of 3 November 2010. This decision, which was widely criticised both in the town and beyond, was due to the declining market share Malvern has on the overall water market. On 28 October 2011, it was reported that the bottling plant is being sold to a property company.

== Interest groups ==
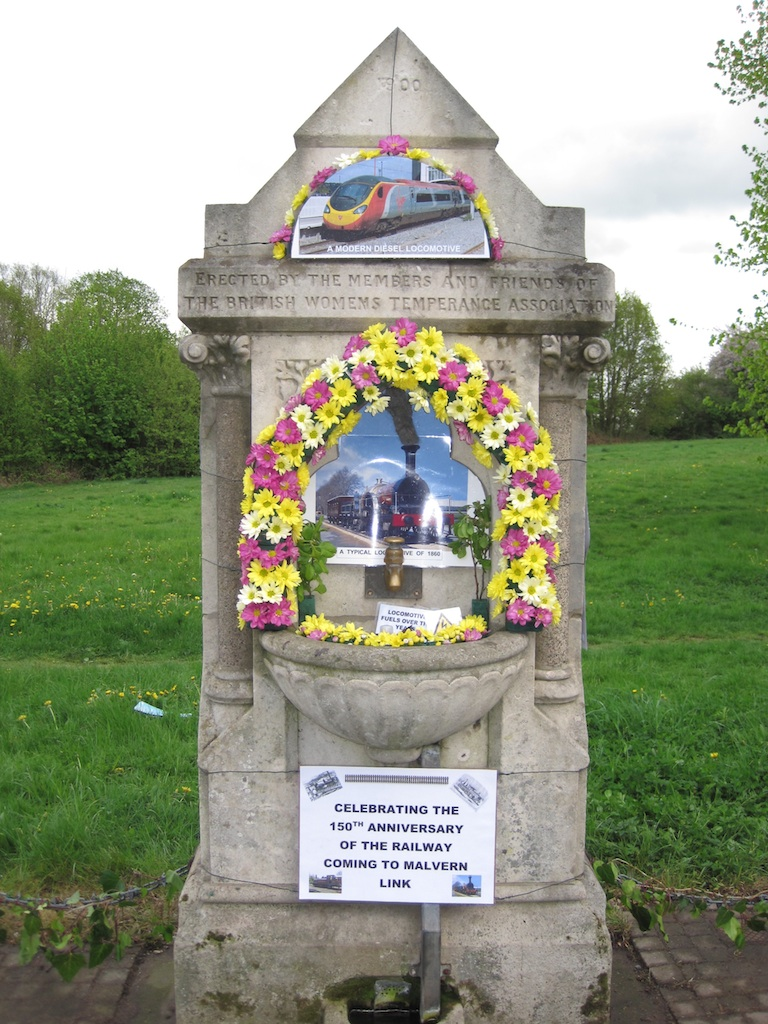
The Temperance Fountain (built 1900), in Malvern Link, dressed in April 2010

Among the interest groups promoting the legacy of Malvern water, the two primary ones are The Malvern Spa Association, and The Friends of Malvern Springs and Wells.

The Malvern Spa Association (MSA) is a non-profit organisation, founded in September 1998, with two primary aims. "To conserve, protect and restore the Springs, Wells, Spouts and Fountains of the Malvern Hills", and "to promote the study, conservation, development and awareness" of them, and of "Great Malvern as a Spa Town". Apart from various fundraising activities and membership fees, the MSA receives funding through the Heritage Lottery Fund, which is managed by the Malvern Hills Area of Outstanding Natural Beauty Unit (Malvern Hills AONB), under the umbrella of the National Association for Areas of Outstanding Natural Beauty (NAAONB). The Malvern Hills AONB also provides grants via such mechanisms as the Sustainable Development Fund. The MSA was founded by the Spa Water Strategy Working Group, comprising Malvern town councillors and artist Rose Garrard. Its patrons are Lord and Lady Sandys, after whose family a spout located in Spring Lane, Malvern Link is named, and which was restored in 2005 as part of the Malvern heritage Project. In 2004, in order to finance improvements and restoration to 20 historical sites, a grant of £270,000 was awarded by the Heritage Lottery Fund. The MSA produces a free newsletter available at the Tourist Information Centre in Great Malvern, at St Ann's Well and for download.

The Friends of Malvern Springs and Wells is an informal group led by Cora Weaver and Bruce Osborne that identified the 130+ springs and wells of the Malvern Hills in the early 1990s. This was in conjunction with a University of Birmingham project to promote new tourism opportunities. Since then they have published various books and a regular bi-monthly newsletter and promoted interest in the wells, including an award scheme for conservation or renovation of springs and wells and their immediate environment. The award scheme is the St Werstan Award for the Enhancement of Water Heritage, given in honour of St. Werstan, one of the earliest saints associated with Malvern. In August 2008, the group's St Werstan award for conservation or renovation of the springs and wells and their surroundings was presented to Coca-Cola Great Britain. At the behest of the Friends, the company is also sponsoring a project to transfer an iconic mulberry tree sapling from Melbourne, Australia. The sapling derives from a cutting taken from a mulberry tree originally planted in 1936 by George Bernard Shaw at the Malvern Festival. The tree was destroyed in a storm in 2000, but research by members of the Friends group revealed that in 1956, a cutting from the tree was sent to Malvern in Victoria, Australia. The Friends group also assists in the general maintenance of wells and spouts, and in organising events and well dressing ceremonies. According to research made by local historians, a tradition of well dressing in the Malverns dates from the 12th and 13th centuries when around 5 August each year, tribute was paid to St Oswald for water cures. The tradition of well dressing continues, fostered by interest groups and activities such as arts projects.

== Art projects ==
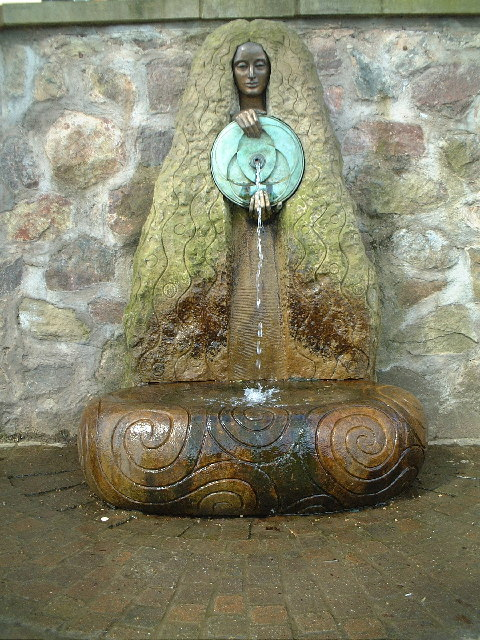
The Malvinha Fountain in the town centre, a sculpture by artist Rose Garrard

In 1996 the Malvern Hills District Council appointed a Malvern Spa Water Strategy Working Group. Independently, in June 1996, sculptor Rose Garrard proposed to the MHDC the creation of a sculpture trail by nationally known sculptors, placed at forgotten springs around the town centre. The council began with the installation of new water features as part of its plan to beautify the town centre. In 1997 the District Council implemented a Spring Water Arts Project to map water sources around the hills. Garrard undertook a two-month artist's residency and collaborated with the public, who provided locations of over 200 water sources. Garrard was commissioned to create the drinking spout, Malvhina, which was unveiled on 4 September 1998.

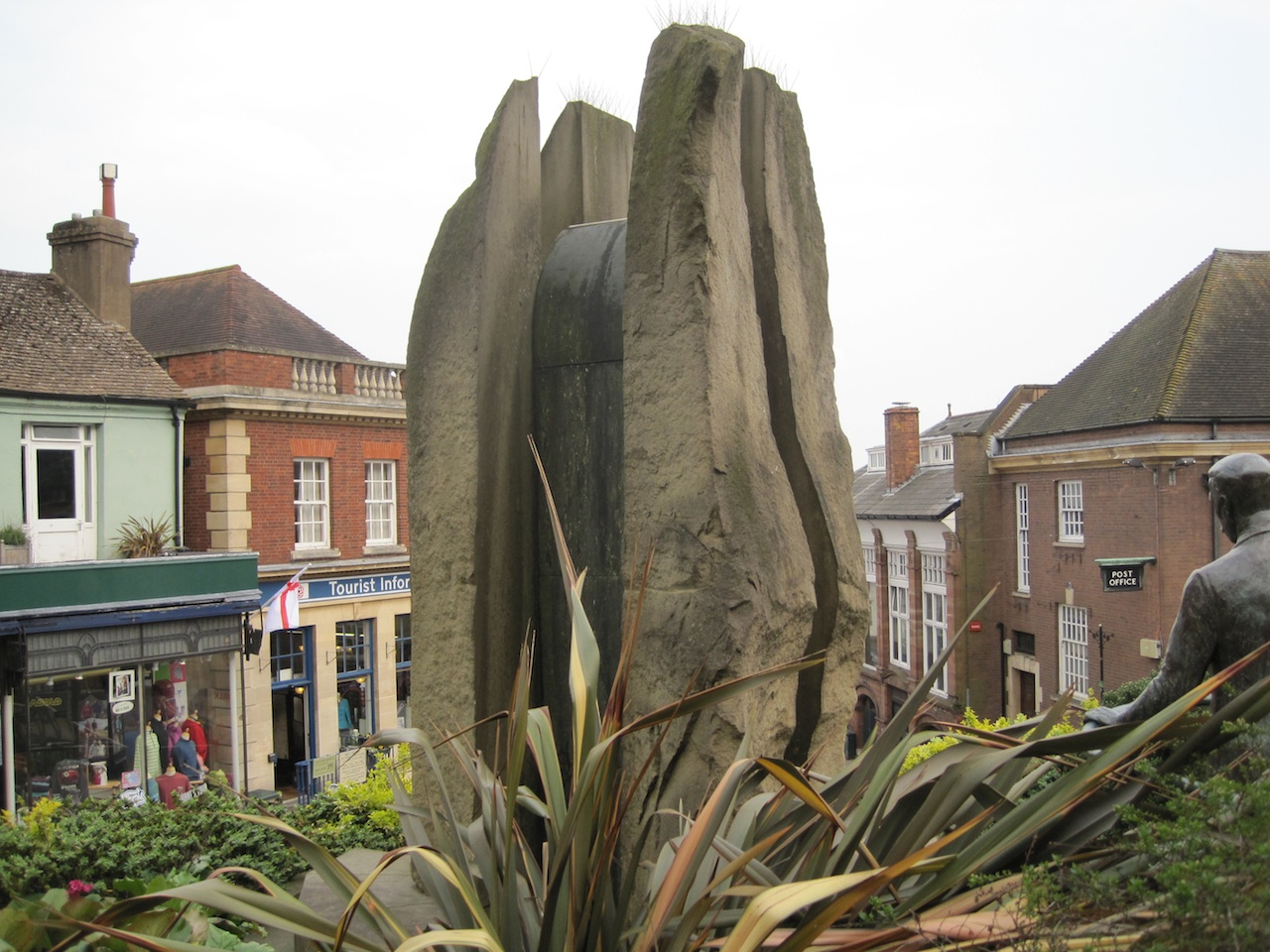
The Enigma water feature in the town centre, part of a group by Rose Garrard. The statue of Edward Elgar is visible on the right.

On 26 May 2000, the Enigma Fountain, also by Garrard, was unveiled by the Duke of York. Its cost of £5,000 was funded by the Malvern Hills District Council, public subscription, and support from by Severn Trent Water, West Midlands Arts, and local businesses. Located on the Bellevue Terrace island in the very centre of the town, together with the statue of Edward Elgar, the group of sculptures embodies both music and water, the two major aspects of Malvern's cultural history.

Art projects continue in various ways. Each year in April a well dressing competition is organised around a theme set by the Malvern Spa Association, with Gold, Silver and Bronze awards presented to adult's and children's groups. The well dressing initiative usually takes place over a period of four or five days with the Malvern spouts starting the annual season of well dressing around the country in the Derbyshire tradition. In 2003, photographer Bob Bilsland gave permission to the BBC to publish 21 of his special panaoramic views of the decorated wells and spouts.

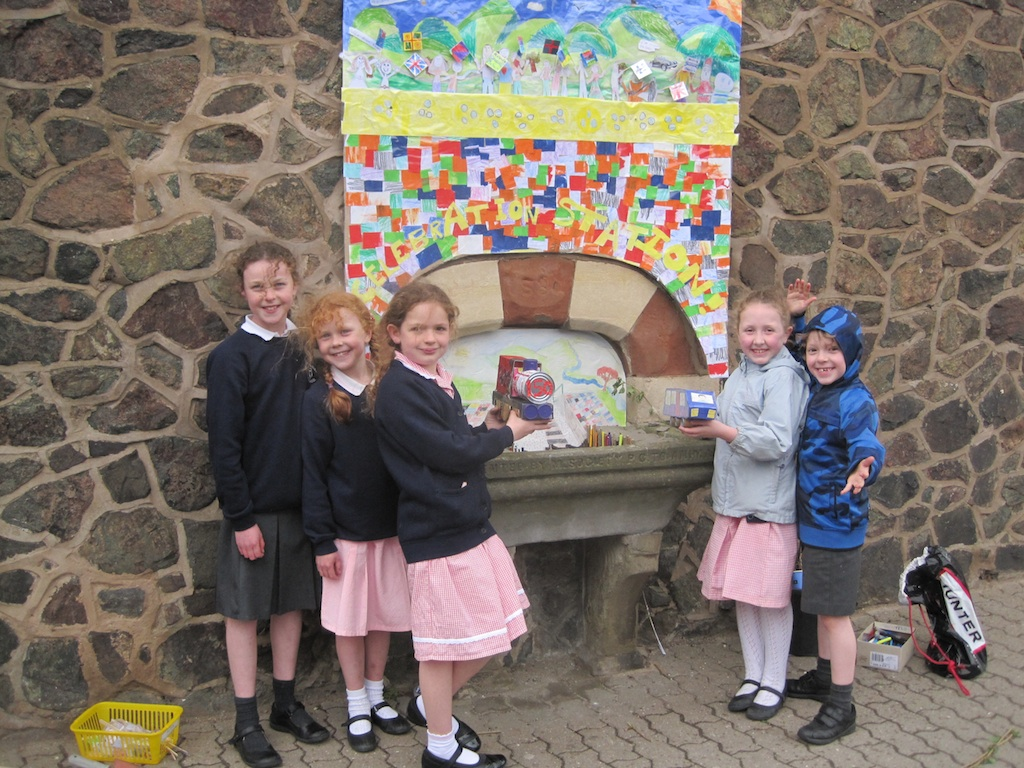
Children dressing the spout at Great Malvern railway station for the 2010 competition

For the 2010 competition based on 'Celebrations', a group of pupils of a local primary school decorated the Great Malvern Railway Station Trough with paper figures representing famous people who have visited Malvern, such as Shaw and Elgar, celebrating 150 years of the railway in the town. Also in 2010, the connection of Florence Nightingale with Malvern water is being celebrated with the help of the Malvern Museum's school poster competition.

Other art projects encapsulate different connections with Malvern water. In 2002 the Elmley Foundation donated an 8-foot water clock designed by French sculptor, and horologist Bernard Gitton to the Malvern theatre and the people of Malvern. The clock, on permanent exhibition in the foyer of the theatre, represents the three main industries of the town: its science, theatre, and water.
