= West Malvern =

Village in Worcestershire, England

Coordinates: 52.11631°N 2.34607°W

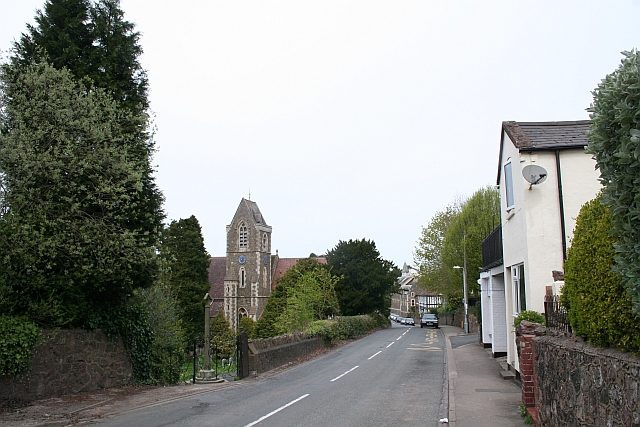
- West Malvern

- Location within Worcestershire
- Population: 1,385
- OS grid reference: SO764465
- Civil parish: West Malvern
- District: Malvern Hills
- Shire county: Worcestershire
- Region: West Midlands
- Country: England
- Sovereign state: United Kingdom
- Post town: MALVERN
- Postcode district: WR14
- Police: West Mercia
- Fire: Hereford and Worcester
- Ambulance: West Midlands
- UK Parliament: West Worcestershire

West Malvern is a village and a civil parish on the west side of the north part of the Malvern Hills, on the western edge of Worcestershire, England. It has become effectively an outer suburb of Malvern and part of an urban area often called The Malverns, locally administered by Malvern Hills District Council and its own parish council. Its altitude up to 250 metres gives West Malvern panoramic views of the adjacent Herefordshire countryside to the west. The Church of St James, built in 1840, has an adjacent Church of England primary school. The churchyard includes the grave of Peter Mark Roget, author of Roget's Thesaurus, who died while on holiday in the village. The parish population was 1,385 according to the 2011 census and 1,217 according to the 2021 census.

== Etymology ==
The name Malvern is first attested in a charter of around 1030, as Mælfern, and then in the Domesday Book of 1086 as Malferna. The name derives from the Common Brittonic words that survive in modern Welsh as moel ("bare") and bryn ("hill"); thus it once meant "bare hill". The name perhaps applied originally to the hill now called Worcestershire Beacon, after which Great Malvern and Little Malvern were then named. The West element of West Malvern was added in modern times to distinguish the settlement from these older centres.

== Culture ==
Since 2005 West Malvern has hosted an annual one-day music festival West Fest. In years when West Fest makes a profit the committee distributes grants "to support community action, cultural development, training or to meet special needs." From the profits of West Fest 2008 "a total of £7,150 was distributed" in the Malvern Hills area to 2nd Malvern Link Brownies, the Theatre of Small Convenience, West Malvern Sean Éireann McMahon Academy (Irish dancing), West Malvern Cricket Club, Malvern Mencap, St James Primary School, Leapfrogs Playgroup, and Malvern Access Group. There has also been a regular weekly acoustic music session in the village each Sunday evening since 1996.

The West Malvern Social Club hosts several regular activities. These include:

- a regular acoustic music session every Sunday evening since 1996
- an open mic night every Thursday
- a monthly Jazz evening, every 4th Friday
- a film night, showing independent and vintage films every 3rd Friday
- frequent one-off performances by local artists

On 20–22 August 2010 a visual arts festival was held in the village, in support of the Malvern Hills Community Foundation, in a variety of venues including the Regents Theological College, St James's Church, St James Primary School, and the Brewers Arms pub. Local garages, gazebos, and even garden walls and railings were also used to display artworks. The event, which is intended to become annual, was modelled on a similar arts festival at Saint-Céneri-le-Gérei in Normandy, France.

=== West Malvern Ring ===
In 2025, the village of West Malvern hosted a local production of Richard Wagner's opera cycle, Der Ring des Nibelungen. The project, titled West Malvern Ring, was the culmination of a long-held idea by the late resident Rob Rankin. It was brought to fruition by musical director Judith Sanoon and creative director Tim White.

The production, which ran from August 15 to August 17, presented a two-and-a-half-hour musical play, condensing the sixteen-hour original work. The staging utilized live acting, a simplified score, and video sequences filmed in and around the Malvern Hills. The production featured over 40 local participants and was performed at the West Malvern Social Club and Village Hall. It offered an interpretation of the epic story of gods and mortals within a community-focused framework.

== Landmarks ==
The Malvern Hills area is well known for its Malvern water and there are several springs and wells in West Malvern including Westminster Bank Spout, St James Churchyard Basin, West Malvern Tap, Hayslad, Royal Well, and Ryland's Well and St Thomas' Well.

There were quarries around West Malvern including Dingle and several more.

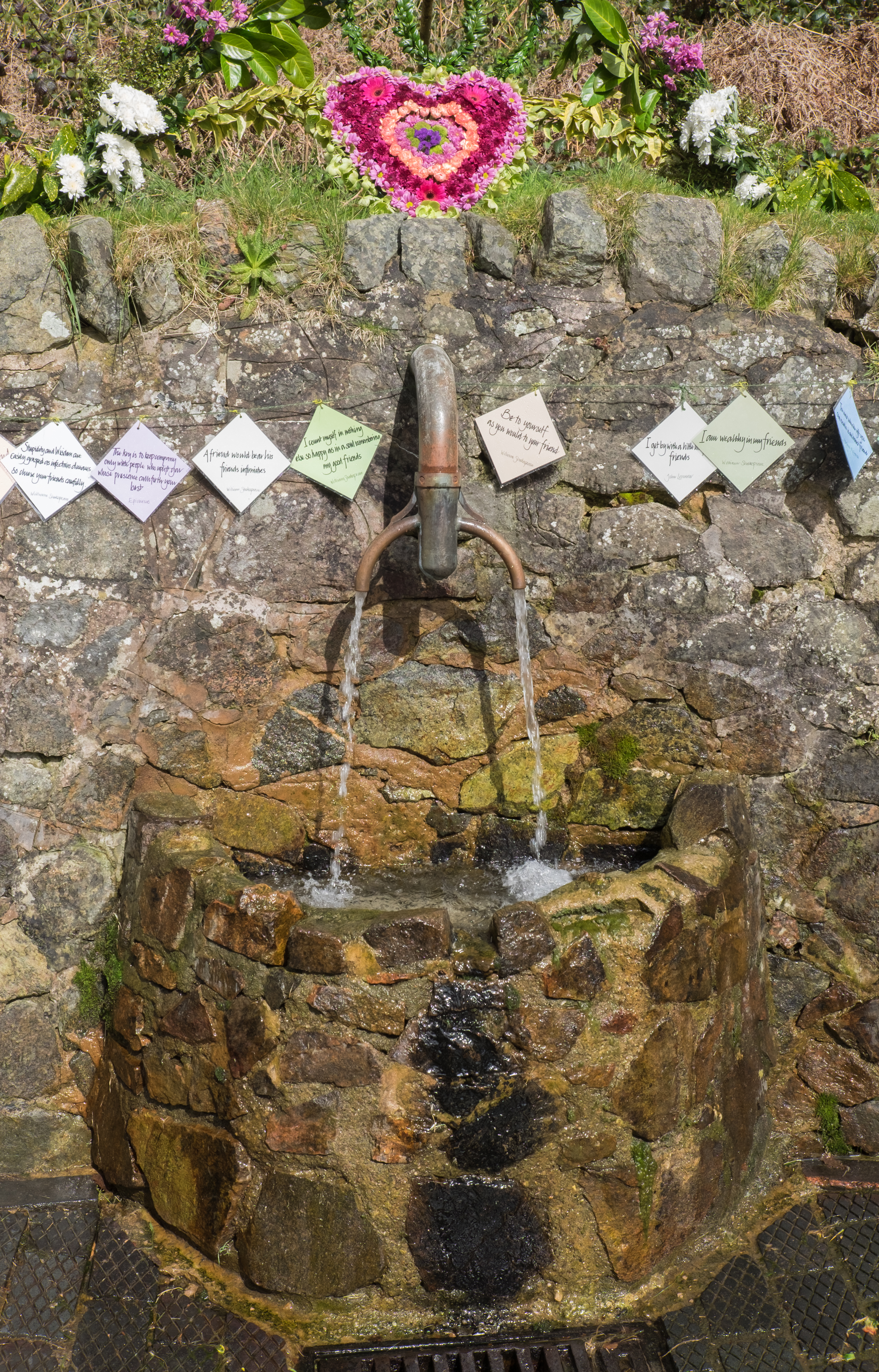
Hayslad Spout after a well dressing festival

== Transport ==
=== Rail ===
The nearest railway stations are Malvern Link (for the northern end of the parish) and Colwall (for the southern end), both on the Cotswold Line between Hereford and Worcester.

=== Bus ===
The 675 bus (operated by First Midland Red) links West Malvern to Great Malvern, Colwall and Ledbury running approximately 2-hourly from Monday to Saturday.
