= Richard Bannister =

Richard Bannister may refer to:

- Richard Matthew Bannister (born 1957), British media executive
- Richard Banister (died 1626), sometimes spelt Bannister, English oculist
