= Martin Wall =

Martin Wall FRS FRCP (1747– 21 Jun 1824), was an English physician and educator.

Wall was the son of John Wall and was baptised at Worcester on 24 June 1747. He was educated at Winchester College, and entered at New College, Oxford, on 21 November 1763. He graduated B.A. on 17 June 1770, M.A. on 2 July 1771, M.D. on 9 June 1773, and was a fellow of his college from 1763 to 1778. He studied medicine at St. Bartholomew's Hospital, London, and in Edinburgh. Wall moved back to Oxford to start a practice in 1774, and on 2 November 1775 was elected physician to the Radcliffe Infirmary. He was appointed reader in chemistry in 1781, and delivered an inaugural dissertation on the study of chemistry on 7 May 1781, which he printed in 1783, with an essay on the 'Antiquity and Use of Symbols in Astronomy and Chemistry' and 'Observations on the Diseases prevalent in the South Sea Islands'. He drank tea with Dr Samuel Johnson at Oxford in June 1784, and his essay was obviously the origin of the conversation on the advantage of physicians travelling among barbarous nations.

In 1785 Wall was elected Lichfield Professor of Clinical Medicine at Oxford, an office which he retained till his death. He edited his father's essays in 1780, and in 1786 published Clinical Observations on the Use of Opium in Low Fevers, with Remarks on the Epidemic Fever at Oxford in 1785. The epidemic was typhus. He was elected a fellow of the Royal College of Physicians on 25 June 1787, delivered their Harveian Oration in 1788, and in the same year was elected a Fellow of the Royal Society. He died on 21 June 1824. James Boswell speaks of him as 'this learned, ingenious, and pleasing gentleman.' Wall was married with a son, Martin Sandys Wall (1785–1871), chaplain in ordinary to the prince regent and to the British embassy at Vienna.
