= Malvern Museum =

Museum in Malvern, Worcestershire, England

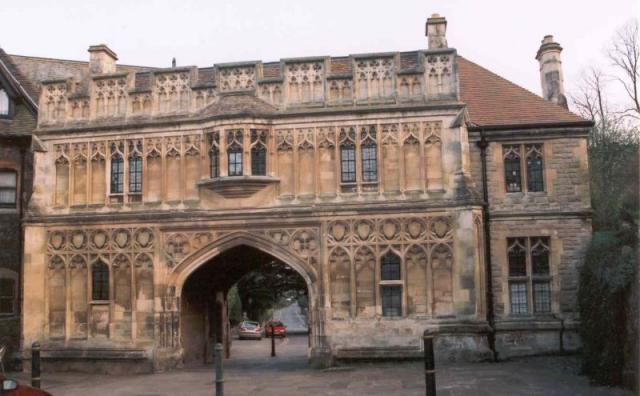
- Abbey Gateway, Malvern town centre

- The location of Malvern Museum within Worcestershire
- Established: 1979
- Location: Malvern, Worcestershire, England
- Coordinates: 52.11049°N 2.32952°W
- Type: Local
- Public transit access: Great Malvern railway station
- Website: malvernmuseum.co.uk

The Malvern Museum in Great Malvern, the town centre of Malvern, Worcestershire, England, is located in the Priory Gatehouse, the former gateway to the Great Malvern Priory. The museum was established in 1979 and is owned and managed by the Malvern Museum Society Ltd, a registered charity. The Priory Gatehouse was a gift to the museum in 1980 from the de Vere Group, the owners of the neighbouring Abbey Hotel, and is staffed by volunteers. As such, the building itself is the museum's major exhibit.

Florence Nightingale exhibit at Malvern Museum 2010

Among the museum's exhibits are many local artefacts and archaeological findings dating from the Iron Age hill fort at the British Camp, to recent history. A series of rooms depicts different periods of history and include lifelike displays and information boards. Themes covered include natural history, Malvern Priory, Malvern Forest and Chase, life in Victorian Malvern, Edward Elgar, the Malvern Festival, the history of the local economy including the 19th century hydrotherapy using Malvern water (instrumental in the settlement's rapid growth from a village to a large town), the development of radar by TRE, and Morgan Motor Company cars.

A separate display centres on Malvern resident Lorna Beatrice Lloyd (1914-1942), Lloyd's writing, and her artistic outputs. The main artefact in the collection is a diary that charts the progress of the Second World War from 1st September 1939 until 4th January 1941. The 106 diary entries offer commentary on events such as the reception of child evacuees in Malvern, the issue of ration books to its citizens, and the billeting of armed personnel in civilians' houses in the town. It also covers significant war time incidents and events reported in the print and broadcast news such as the evacuation of Dunkirk (26th May to 4th June 1940), the Battle of Britain (July to October 1940), the sinking of the City of Benares (17th September 1940) and the bombing of Coventry (14th November 1940), all from the perspective of a young woman living through wartime in a provincial English town. Alongside the BBC and the British Library, in 2022 the Malvern Museum supported a UK Arts and Humanities Research Council project undertaken by staff and students at Edinburgh Napier University to produce a nationally acclaimed eight episode podcast series based on the war diary (supplemented by contemporaneous news reports, including original BBC broadcast material), and then to conduct research into audience engagement with digitised archives. The Museum hosted the podcast series launch event, with contributions from Museum staff, at Great Malvern Priory on 22nd May 2022.

The museum is open daily, 10.o0 to 16.30, from 25 March to 31 October.

== Priory Gatehouse ==
Erroneously referred to as the Abbey Gateway, the Priory Gatehouse was built in the late 15th century, and is the second oldest building in Great Malvern after the Norman Priory Church. The Gatehouse was the main entrance into the Priory, and is one of the few monastic buildings to survive the Dissolution of Great Malvern Priory in 1539. In 1544 the Gatehouse was sold to William Pynnocke, who sold it a year later to John Knotsford. During the Elizabethan period it passed by marriage to the Savage family, who held it until 1774. In the 19th century the Gatehouse was used as offices for solicitors, architects, and estate agents, and its upper floor served as a venue for the Malvern Police Court.
