= St. Ann's Well, Malvern =

Coordinates: 52.1099°N 2.33393°W

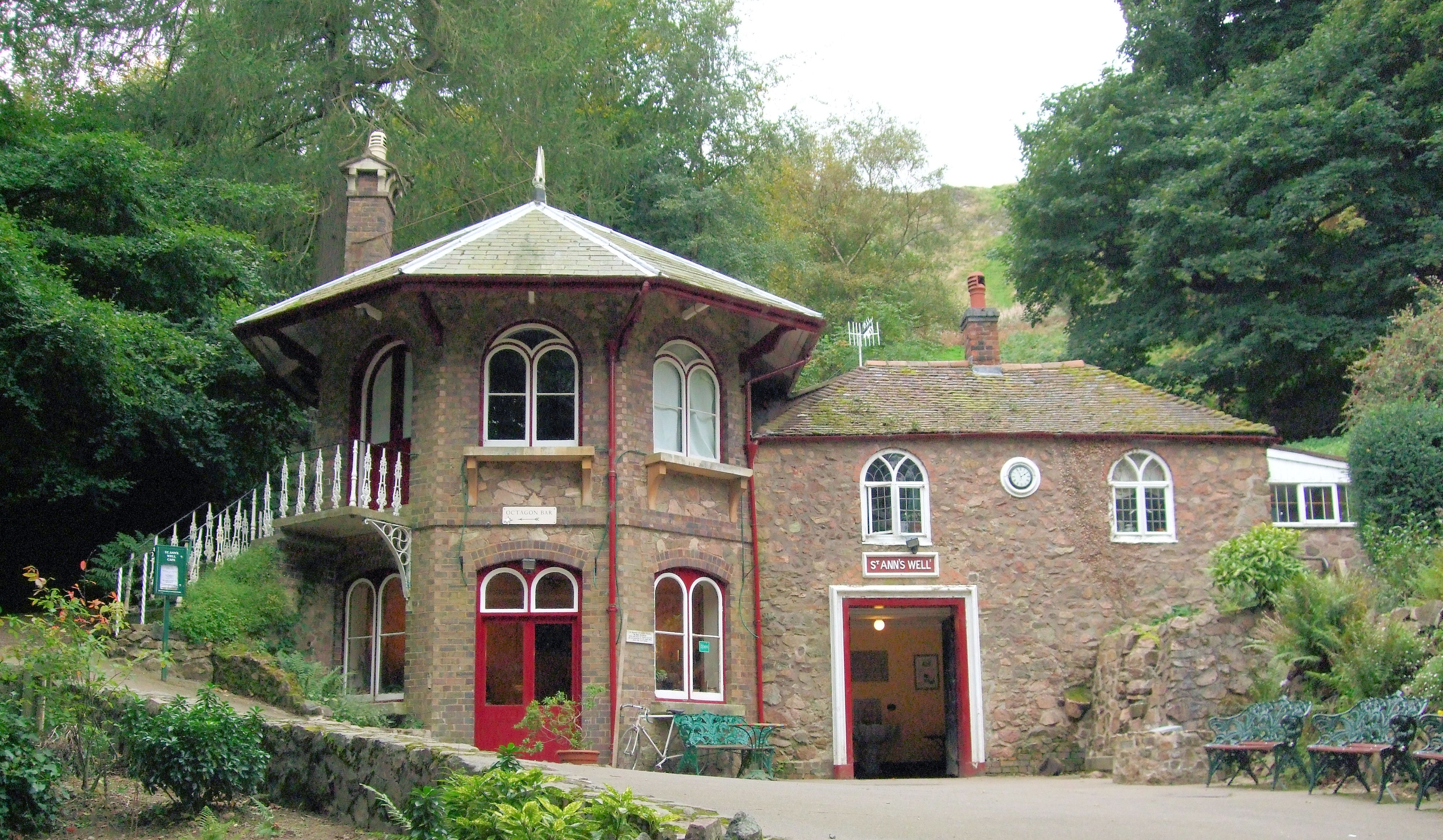
St Ann's Well and Cafe

St. Ann's Well is set on the slopes of the Malvern Hills above Great Malvern. It is a popular site on a path leading up to the Worcestershire Beacon and lies on the final descent of the Worcestershire Way. The spring or well is named after Saint Anne, the maternal grandmother of Christ and the patron saint of many wells. A building that dates back to 1813 houses the well or spring. Malvern water flows freely from an elaborately carved water spout. The building also hosts a cafe. During the early 20th century, the now-defunct Burrows company bottled and sold Malvern Water from this source under the "St Ann's Well" brand.

== Toponymy ==
St Ann's Well is a natural spring which Palmer suggests may have been dedicated to Anu, a Celtic water goddess. A 19th-century antiquarian speculated that "St Ann's Well — in its primary form means simply 'the well dedicated to the sun'".

== General history ==
=== St Werstan ===
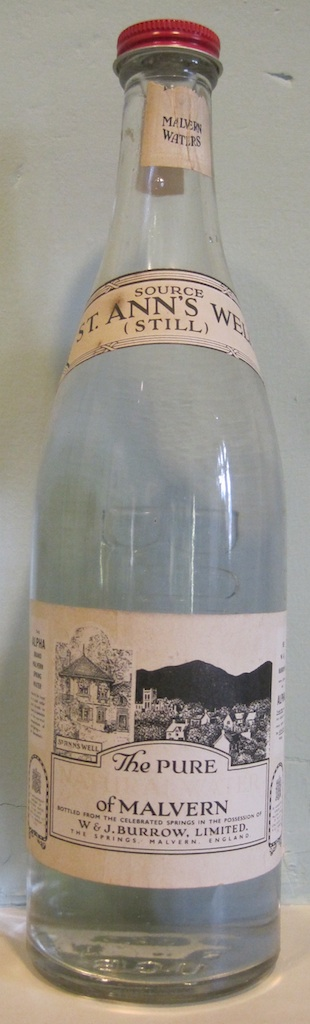
An early 20th century Malvern Water (St Ann's Well) bottle.

According to James Nott one of the most important events in the history of Malvern was the arrival of St. Werstan, who established a cell on the hillside near St. Ann's Well. St. Werstan was a monk of the Saxon monastery of Deerhurst in Gloucestershire which was destroyed by Vikings. Werstan escaped and fled through the Malvern Chase, finding sanctuary on the Malvern Hills. Legend tells that the settlement in Great Malvern began following the murder of St. Werstan. Although the legend may be monastic mythology, historians have concluded that he was the original martyr. St Werstan's oratory is thought to have been located on the site of St Michael's Chapel which is believed to have stood on the site of Bello Sguardo, a Victorian villa. Bello Sguardo was built on the site of Hermitage Cottage. The cottage was demolished in 1825 and ecclesiastical carvings were found within it. A Mediaeval undercroft, human bones and parts of a coffin were also uncovered. A 15th-century stained-glass window in Great Malvern Priory depicts the story of St. Werstan, with details of his vision, the consecration of his chapel, Edward the Confessor granting the charter for the site, and Werstan's martyrdom.

=== Healing waters ===
The quality of Malvern spring water was appreciated in the medieval period. The purity of St Ann's Well in particular was well known in the 15th century as a curative for the "many maladies suffered by mediaeval folk". An old song attributed to the Rev. Edmund Rea, who became Vicar of Great Malvern in 1612, alludes to the healing properties of the well:

Out of thy famous Hille
There daily springeth
A water passing still
That always bringeth
Great comfort to alle them
That are diseased men
And makes them well again

So Prayse the Lord!

=== Dr John Wall ===
The reputation of St Ann's Well water was promoted by Dr John Wall, a Worcestershire physician, who analysed the water in 1745 and found that "the efficacy of this water seems chiefly to arise from its great purity". Wall published the results along with accounts of miracle cures in Experiments and Observations on the Malvern Waters (1757). The chief aim of the publication was to raise money to make improvements to the primitive building at St Ann's Well. It is telling that his research demonstrated that it was necessary for the waters to be drunk on the spot and taken regularly to be successful.

The Well House was built in 1813 and was owned by Lady Emily Foley who granted the public free access to the spring water.

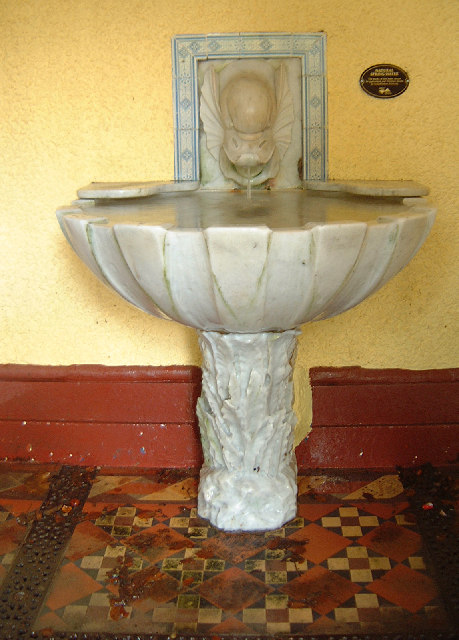
St Ann's Well Spout

St Ann's Well was one of the most popular watering places for wealthy invalids in the early days of the Water Cure.

The unusual octagonal extension was erected in 1841.

Queen Adelaide visited St. Ann's Well in September 1842.

In the 1850s, water from St Ann's Well was bottled by John and William Burrow at the Bottling Works Spring in Robson Ward's yard on Belle Vue Terrace in Great Malvern. Bottling ceased here in the 1950s and the former bottling works are now furniture showrooms. Water for the Bottling Works Spring is piped from St Ann's Well.

In 1866, John Down established a photographic studio at St Ann's Well, and used the spring water for processing. He also constructed a camera obscura which was situated on the nearby St Ann's Delight.

In 1892, Lady Foley donated a Sicilian marble spout and basin. The spout is in the form of a dolphin's head positioned above a shell-shaped basin. A plaque above the spout reads:

Drink of this crystal fountain
And praise the loving Lord
Who from the rocky mountain
This living stream out-poured
Fit emblem of Holy Fount
That flows from God's eternal mount

This marble tablet was placed at St Ann's Well by the Rt Hon Lady Emily Foley of the Manor of Gt Malvern Oct 1892.

The lines were composed by the Rev W Blake Atkinson Rector of Bradley Nr Redditch.

=== Old Moses ===
From at least 1817 donkeys were used to carry visitors up the hills and by 1852 there were numerous donkey hire stands. One particular donkey named Old Moses carried a young Princess Victoria to St Ann's Well where she officially opened a new path from Nob's (now St Ann's) Delight to Foley Walk.

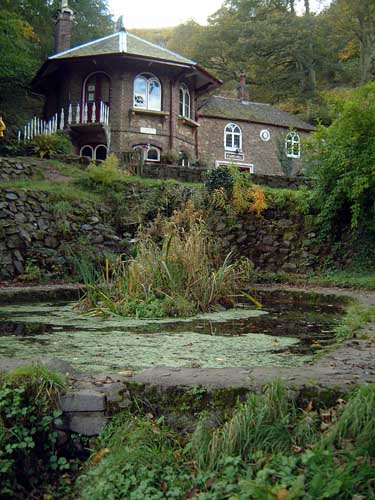
St Ann's Well

=== Blind George Pullen ===
George Pullen, a blind musician, earned his living playing the harmonium and dulcitone almost every day for 50 years from about 1880 to entertain visitors to St Ann’s Well. It is said he could "recognise the sound of regular visitors’ footsteps and would play their favourite tune as they approached".

=== St. Anne's Pottery, Muriel Bell ===
From 1932 to around 1937 the potter Muriel Bell, a former student of Bernard Leach, had her studio at St. Anne's Well, making utility stoneware articles. It was during this time that she met puppeteer Waldo Lanchester, who used a site opposite St. Anne's to set up his puppet theatre for the Malvern Festival.

=== Controversy ===
In 1963 the Malvern Hills Conservators made the decision to demolish the "lump of Victoriana" known as St Ann's Well. John Betjeman, poet and founding member of The Victorian Society, expressed concern about the plans for the building and his support and strong public feeling for St Ann's Well convinced the Conservators to change their minds.

=== Restoration ===
In 2005 the gardens at St Ann's Well were restored by the Malvern Spa Association, the Area of Outstanding Natural Beauty and the Malvern Hills Conservators. The work was funded by a grant from the Heritage Lottery Fund. On 9 December 2005 the completion of the work was celebrated by over 100 people at St Ann's Well. Music was provided by the Nominus Minstrels which concluded with a rendition of a 17th-century song about Malvern water.

=== St Ann's Well dispute ===
In October 2009, the Malvern Hills Conservators announced plans to take St Ann's Well cafe back under their own management on expiry of the tenancy on 31 March 2010 to achieve a long-standing goal of providing a visitor information centre. Although Malvern Town Council voted in favour of supporting the action taken by the Conservators the announcement was met with opposition from local residents and visitors to the area and a public meeting was called by the Malvern Hills Conservators to address the concerns of the public on 12 November 2009. Thirty-six members of the public attended the meeting and asked a total of 26 questions regarding plans for St Ann's Well. At a meeting of Malvern Hills Conservators on 11 March 2010, supporters of the proprietor of St Ann's Well asked a further 29 questions, some of them concerning the plans for the cafe and others about other aspects of the Conservators work and in May 2010 a petition asking the Conservators to reconsider their decision was presented to the Board of Conservators. It was signed by 4,500 people, including the actor Martin Shaw, poet Benjamin Zephaniah and Mary McCartney.

In June 2010 the Conservators announced that the board and tenant had agreed to try and resolve the dispute through mediation and in December 2010 they announced that they would be offering the tenant a new lease.

In June 2011 the Malvern Hills Conservators announced that the dispute over the lease would be investigated by a committee. The first Inquiry Committee recognised that there was a conflict of interest as its members were board members when the decision not to renew the lease was taken and following the election in October 2011 a new committee was formed. Its Terms of Reference were to inquire into the events surrounding the renewal of the St Ann’s Well Cafe lease due for renewal in 2010 and subsequent events leading up to the formation of the Inquiry Committee on 1 December 2011 and make recommendations arising from the findings of the inquiry to ensure a more effective governance model for the Board. In February 2012 the Inquiry Committee invited members of the public to submit written evidence to be considered as part of the inquiry. In April 2012 the committee published a list of over 50 questions it felt needed answering and the chairman of the board contacted the Charity Commission about his concerns over the cost of the dispute. A reply from the Charity Commission to the Conservators stated that "It is clear the Commission has a potential regulatory concern here. This is because £118,500 of charity money has been spent on litigation that was ultimately unsuccessful." In May 2012 the inquiry committee published the 19 submissions that they received and invited further questions from the public.

In September 2012 the Malvern Hills Conservators published their Inquiry Report. At a Special Meeting of the Board the Conservators voted to "acknowledge the Report and its findings of major failure", "...recognise the need for reform" and "...extend a formal apology to John Redman, his family, his staff, members of the general public and all those affected by these events as well as the staff of Malvern Hills Conservators past and present."

== St Ann's Well in cultural life ==
=== New Age philosophy ===
Alfred Watkins theorised that St Ann's Well was the start of a ley line that passes along the Malvern ridge through several wells including the Holy Well, Walms Well and St. Pewtress Well. In Early British Trackways (1922) Watkins gives another example of a ley line that he believed passed through Priory Church, Malvern and St. Ann's Well to Little Mountain (Westbrook) via Arthur's Stone, Cross End, Moccas Church, Monnington Church, Credenhill (old) Court, Pipe and Lyde Church, and Beacon Hill.

In The Ley Hunter's Companion (1979) Paul Devereux theorised that a 10-mile alignment he called the "Malvern Ley" passed through St Ann's Well, the Wyche Cutting, a section of the Shire Ditch, Midsummer Hill, Whiteleaved Oak, Redmarley D'Abitot and Pauntley. British author John Michell wrote that Whiteleaved Oak is the centre of the "Circle of Perpetual Choirs" and is equidistant from Glastonbury and Stonehenge.

Since 2008 an interfaith "Blessing of the Waters" service featuring songs, chants and blessings from many faiths has been held at St Ann's Well.

=== Malvern Fringe Festival ===
Until recently St Ann's Well was the starting point for the annual Malvern Fringe May Day procession. The first procession was held in 1994.

=== Music, poetry and dance ===
Nigel Kennedy, British born violinist and violist, played and recorded in the Octagon room.

Dick McBride, American beat poet and City Lights store manager, celebrated the publication of Remembered America (2004) with a reading in the Octagon room.

Robin Broadbank, flamenco guitarist and former producer for Nimbus Records, performed at the Octagon room in October 2004.

Flatworld recorded their eponymous album at St Ann's Well in 2005.

In July 2009, over 100 Morris dancers participated in the "Day of Dance" at St Ann’s Well. The event was organised by Old Meg Morris, a mixed Morris dancing side based in Malvern. The sides came from around the country, each with their own particular style of dancing, representing various Morris traditions.
