= St. Werstan =

Monk in Gloucestershire

Werstan
- Detail of a stained glass window in Great Malvern Priory depicting St. Werstan

St. Werstan was a monk of the Anglo-Saxon monastery of Deerhurst in Gloucestershire which was destroyed by the Northmen. Werstan escaped and fled through the Malvern Chase, finding sanctuary on the Malvern Hills at a hermitage near St. Ann's Well.

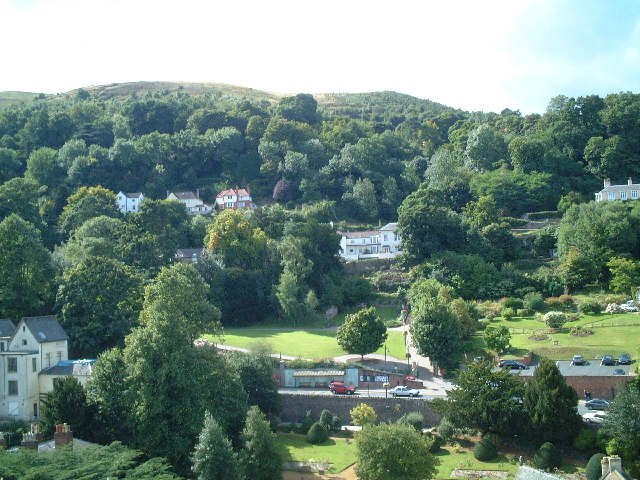
Rosebank Gardens and Bello Sguardo (centre) viewed from the top of Great Malvern Priory

St Werstan's oratory is thought to have been located on the site of St Michael's Chapel which is believed to have stood on the site of Bello Sguardo, a Victorian Villa. Bello Sguardo was built on the site of Hermitage Cottage. The cottage was demolished in 1825 and ecclesiastical carvings were found within it. A Mediaeval undercroft, human bones and parts of a coffin were also uncovered.

Legend tells that the settlement in Great Malvern began following the murder of St. Werstan. Although the legend may be monastic mythology, historians have however concluded that he was the original martyr. A 15th-century stained glass window in Great Malvern Priory depicts the story of St. Werstan, with details of his vision, the consecration of his chapel, Edward the Confessor granting the charter for the site, and Werstan's martyrdom. Grindrod (p. 168) states that Deerhurst was an Abbey before becoming a Priory, that Werstan was its Abbot, and that he founded the religious community in Malvern. He does not provide references.
