= Richard Banister =

English writer

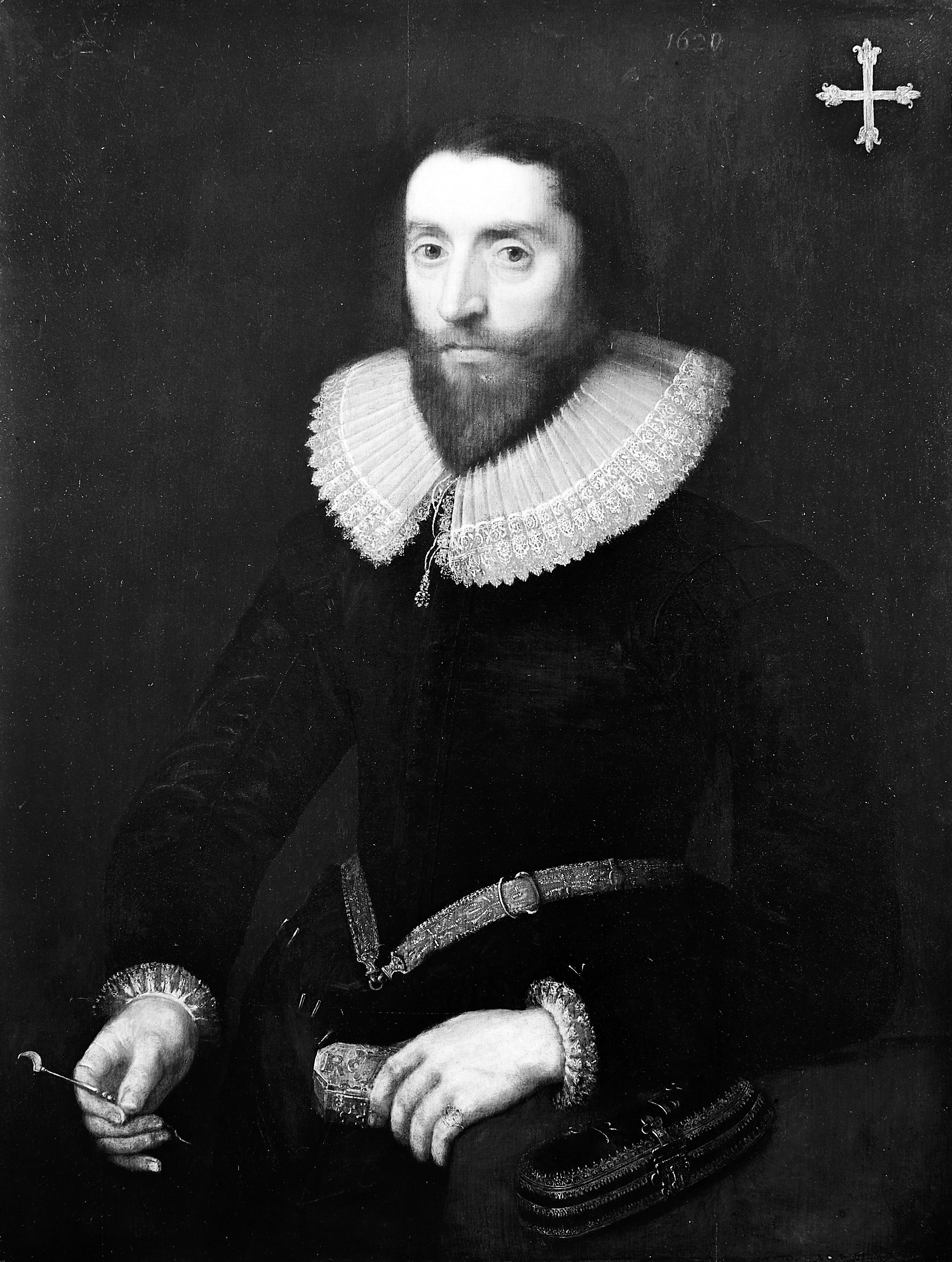

Richard Banister (died 1626), was an English oculist of Stamford, Lincolnshire. He was educated under his relative, John Banister, the surgeon. He devoted himself especially to certain branches of surgery, such as 'the help of hearing by the instrument, the cure of the hare-lip and the wry neck, and diseases of the eyes.’ He studied under various persons eminent in these subjects, among whom were ‘Henry Blackborne, Robert Hall of Worcester, Master Velder of Fennie Stanton, Master Surflet of Lynn, and Master Barnabie of Peterborough.’ To complete his education he studies the works of authors such as Rhazes, Mesne, Fernelius, and Vesalius.

Banister then established himself in Stamford, and acquired considerable reputation as an oculist. He was in demand in all the nearby large towns, and was even asked to go to London. He appears to have performed numerous operations for cataract, and to have cured twenty-four blind persons at Norwich, of which he obtained a certificate from the mayor and aldermen.

In 1622 Banister published a second edition of a Treatise of One Hundred and Thirteen Diseases of the Eyes and Eyelids, with some profitable additions of certain principles and experiments, by Richard Banister, oculist and practitioner in physic. It is a translation from the French of Jacques Guillemeau, made by one A. H., and at its first publication dedicated to the elder Banister. Guillemeau was a distinguished surgeon at the courts of Charles IX, Henry III, and Henry IV of France, and his work, Traité des Maladies de l'Œil (Handbook for treatment of ailments of the eye), was published in Paris in 1585, and at Lyon in 1610, and was translated both into Flemish and into German. The English translation by A. H. having become out of print, a second edition was published in 1622 by Richard Banister, together with an 'appendant part' called Cervisia Medicata, Purging Ale, with divers aphorisms and principles. The work received the name of Banister's Breviary of the Eyes in which the curative properties of Malvern water are also mentioned. In this treatise he names the best oculists for the last fifty or sixty years, not university graduates. Banister was buried at St Mary's Church, Stamford, 7 April 1626. His wife Anne was buried there 16 April 1624.
