= John Wall (physician) =

English physician (1708–1776)

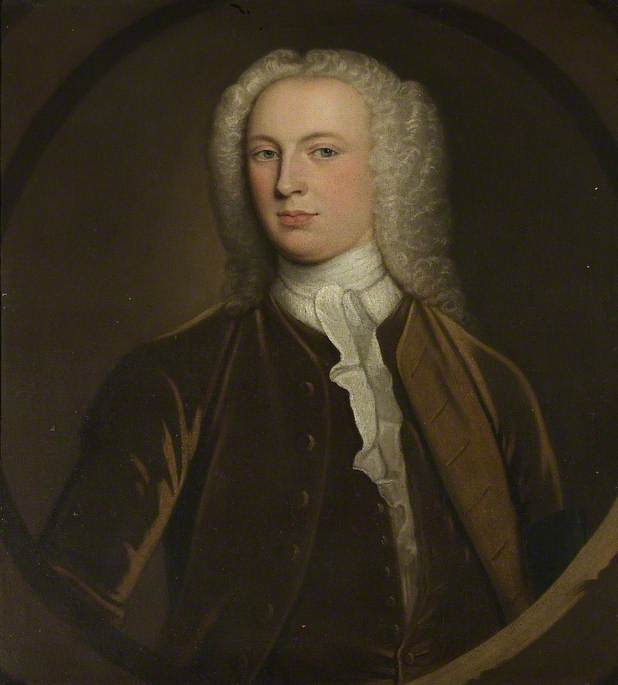
- Portrait of John Wall
- Born: 12 October 1708; Powick, Worcestershire
- Died: 27 June 1776 (aged 67); Bath, Somerset
- Occupation: Physician

John Wall (12 October 1708 – 27 June 1776), was an English physician, one of the founders of the Worcester Royal Infirmary (now the University of Worcester' Business School) and the Royal Worcester porcelain works. He was also involved in the development of Malvern as a spa town.

== Early life ==
Wall was born at Powick, Worcestershire, in 1708, was the son of John Wall, a tradesman of Worcester city. He was educated at the King's School, Worcester, matriculated at Worcester College, Oxford on 23 June 1726, graduated B.A. in 1730, and migrated to Merton College, where he was elected fellow in 1735, and whence he took the degrees of M.A. and M.B. in 1736, and of M.D. in 1759.

== Career ==
After taking his M.B. degree he began practice as a physician in Worcester in 1736, marrying Catherine Sandys, the youngest daughter of Martin Sandys, a barrister and uncle of Samuel Sandys, 1st Baron Sandys. He settled in a grand house at 43 Foregate Street, Worcester, and built up a very large private medical practice, becoming both wealthy and well-known.

He was one of the founders of a charitable hospital, the Worcester Infirmary, in Silver street in the town in 1745. By 1751, the infirmary had become famous, particularly for its treatment of scarlet fever and Diphtheria cases. In 1771, The institution transferred to Castle Street.

Wall was also active in the development of nearby Malvern as a spa resort. Together with William Davies, a local apothecary, he commissioned analyses of the well water in the area (from St. Ann's Well, the Holy Well and the chalybeate spring there). The results were eventually published as a 14-page pamphlet in 1756. as "Experiments and observations on the Malvern Water". This had a second edition a few years later and a third edition of 158 pages in 1763. In fact, the water actually contained very little mineral content, which inspired one local humourist to write:

The Malvern water, says Doctor John Wall,
Is famed for containing just nothing at all.

Subsequently, he became involved in schemes to improve facilities and accommodation in Malvern for visitors to the spa, and also organised the bottling of water from the wells for those too sick to attend in person. In 1751, Wall founded the Royal Worcester porcelain factory (then the "Worcester Tonquin Manufactory") with William Davies and a group of 13 business men. Wall, was also a talented artist, producing original paintings as well as designs for bookplates and stained glass windows. It was said that "an unremitting attachment to the art of painting engaged almost every moment of his leisure hours from his infancy to his death".

He died at Bath on 27 June 1776.

== Medical research and writing ==
In 1744, he wrote an essay (Philosophical Transactions, No. 474, p. 213) on the use of musk in the treatment of the hiccup, of fevers, and in some other cases of spasm. In 1747, he sent a paper to the Royal Society on 'the Use of Bark in Smallpox' (ib. No. 484, p. 583). When cinchona bark was first used its obvious and immediate effect in malarial fever led to the opinion that it had great and unknown powers, and must be used with extreme caution, and this essay is one of a long series extending from the time of Thomas Sydenham to the first half of the nineteenth century, when it was finally determined that the evils anticipated were imaginary, and that bark in moderate doses might be given whenever a general tonic was needed, and to children as well as to adults.

He published in the Gentleman's Magazine for December 1751 an essay on the cure of putrid sore throat, in which, like John Fothergill, he records and does not distinguish cases of scarlet fever and of diphtheria.

He was the first medical writer to point out the resemblance of the condition in man to epidemic foot-and-mouth disease in cattle, a suggestion of great importance. In 1756, he published in Worcester a pamphlet of fourteen pages, "Experiments and Observations on the Malvern Waters." This reached a third edition in 1763, and was then enlarged to 158 pages. Like all works of the kind, it describes numerous cures obviously due to other causes than the waters. He recommended olive oil for the treatment of round worms in children, in 'Observations on the Case of the Norfolk Boy' in 1758, and agreed with Sir George Baker in a letter as to the effect of lead in cider (London Med. Trans, i. 202).

In 1775, he published a letter to William Heberden on angina pectoris, which contains one of the earliest English reports of a post-mortem examination on a case of that disease. He had noticed calcification of the aortic valves and of the aorta itself.

His son, Martin Wall, collected his works into a volume entitled 'Medical Tracts,' which was published at Oxford in 1780.
