= Holy Well, Malvern =

Coordinates: 52.0789°N 2.3366°W

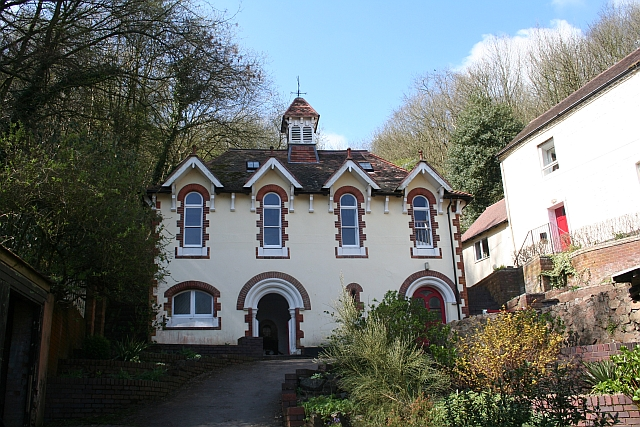
The Holy Well, where Malvern spring water was first bottled on a commercial scale. The well is believed to be the oldest bottling plant in the world.

The Holy Well is set on the slopes of the Malvern Hills above Malvern Wells. The well is believed to be the site of the oldest bottling plant in the world. The Malvern spring water was first bottled on a commercial scale at the well and the building houses a modern commercial bottling plant.

== History ==
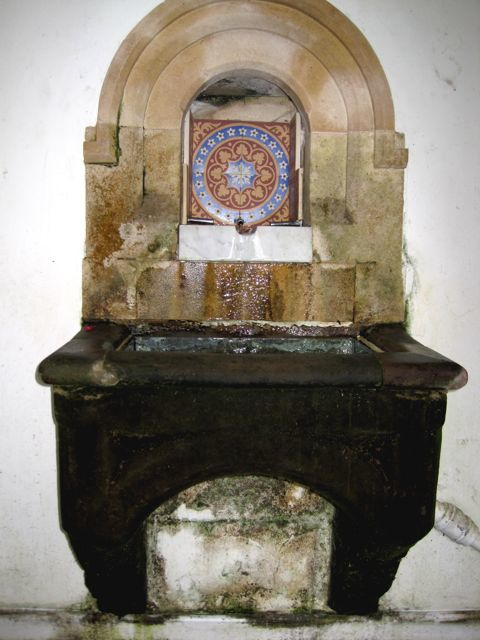
The Holy Well spout

In 1559 the manor and vicarage of Hanley Castle were bought from the Crown by John Hornyold. Within the manor lay a prolific spring known today as the Holy Well spring.

In 1743 Dr John Wall analysed the spring water. He published his analysis of the water, stating that the water contained "nothing at all".

Edward Popham of Tewkesbury was partially cured of his gout at the Holy Well in 1747 and as a vote of thanks erected a small bath that probably resembled a modest stone sink.

In 1853 the Holy Well and nearby Bath Cottage were purchased from squatters by Thomas Charles Hornyold, who extended the building that housed the baths and spa at a cost of £400.

The building was listed as Grade II and of Architectural Interest in the 1970s.

== Bottling at the Holy Well ==
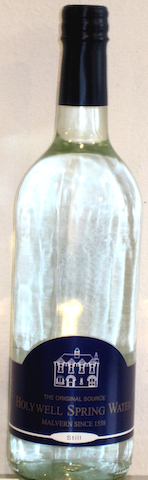
A bottle of Malvern water (2011)

Malvern water has been bottled and distributed in the UK and abroad from as early as the reign of James I, with water bottling at the Holy Well being recorded in 1622. Various local grocers have bottled and distributed Malvern water during the 19th and early 20th centuries, but it was first bottled on a large commercial scale by Schweppes, who opened a bottling plant at Holy Well in Malvern Wells in 1850. As official caterers to the Great Exhibition of 1851, Schweppes introduced the water as Malvern Soda, later renaming it Malvern Seltzer Water in 1856. In 1890 Schweppes moved away from Holy Well, entered into a contract with a Colwall family, and built a bottling plant in the village in 1892. The Holy Well was subsequently leased to John and Henry Cuff, who bottled there until the 1960s. The Holy Well became derelict until 2009 when with the aid of a Lottery Heritage grant, production of 1200 bottles per day of Holy Well Spring Water was recommenced by an independent family-owned company.

== Folklore ==
In the past Holy Well was dressed on St. Oswald's day by people who had been cured at the well. St Oswald supposedly revealed the healing properties of the well to a hermit who lived on the hills.

Until 2006, religious items, flowers and other objects were left as votive offerings at the Holy Well. Local Christians and foreign visitors of a wide range of faiths used to leave prayers and wishes in thanks for the pure water. In 2006 concerns were raised in the local press about religious messages that had been written on the walls of the building. As a result, tokens are regularly removed with the exception of the official well dressing of the site in May.

In Early British Trackways Alfred Watkins theorised that a ley line passed along the Malvern Hills through several wells including Holy Well, St Ann's Well, Walms Well and St. Pewtress Well.

== See also ==
- Malvern water
