= The Theatre of Small Convenience =

Theatre in Great Malvern, England

- ToSC
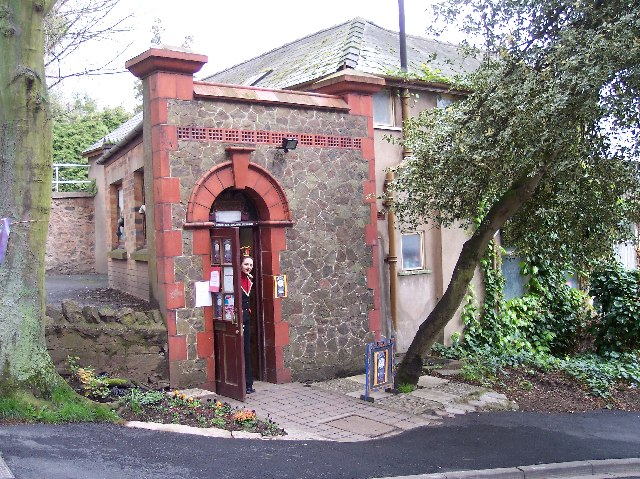
- The Theatre of Small Convenience
- Interactive map of The Theatre of Small Convenience
- Address: Edith Walk; Malvern, Worcestershire; United Kingdom
- Coordinates: 52.11194°N 2.32972°W
- Owner: Malvern Hills District Council
- Capacity: 12
- Type: specialist, puppetry. exhibition space
- Designation: World's smallest commercial theatre

Construction
- Opened: November 1999
- Rebuilt: =
- Years active: 18

Tenant
- The Theatre of Small Convenience CIC

The Theatre of Small Convenience is a theatre on Edith Walk in Great Malvern, Worcestershire, England, founded by local performer and puppeteer Dennis Neale in 1997, opening for the first show in November 1999.

In 2002 it entered the Guinness Book of World Records as the world's smallest commercial theatre, seating up to 12 people. It is less than half the size of the previous record holder, the Piccolo Theatre in Hamburg, Germany.

The theatre's name comes from the building's original purpose – it was converted from a derelict Victorian gentlemen's public convenience. It is trapezoidal in shape, 16 feet (4.9 m) long and from 6 feet (1.8 m) to 10 feet (3.0 m) wide.

The theatre regularly hosted puppetry shows, often created by Neale himself, along with offerings by professional and amateur actors, drama, poetry, storytelling and opera, and became a regular venue of the Malvern Fringe Festival. In 2005 the theatre was chosen as one of the venues for an international puppetry festival.

In 2017, the theatre faced closure following Neale's retirement, with the building falling into disrepair, compounded by a dehumidifier fire damaging the walls and destroying the roof.

A group of local volunteers subsequently acquired the building from the local council, and crowdfunded £17,000 for renovations.

The theatre was featured in the book Twenty Theatres You Should See Before You Die by Amber Massie-Blomfield. A plaque honouring Dennis Neale is fixed to the exterior wall.

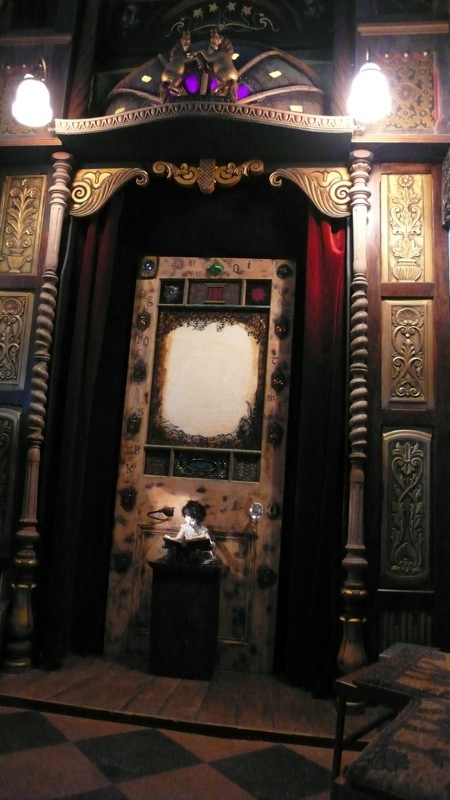
The stage during a puppet show

== Selected productions ==
- Quackery Codswollop by Dennis Neale (2002)
- Quing by Dennis Neale (2004)
- The Tale of the Snowcake Man by Dennis Neale (2004)
- Tempuss Tantrum by Dennis Neale (2006)

== See also ==
- List of theatres in the United Kingdom
