= List of people connected with Malvern, Worcestershire =

People connected with Malvern, Worcestershire include, in addition to those born in Malvern, the many notable people who came to the town to provide or partake of its hydrotherapy, to be educated or to teach at the large number of independent boarding schools such as Malvern College with its long list of notable alumni, and its elementary school, The Downs, and Malvern St James for girls, that still remain active into the 21st century.

A significant number of people were scientists at the Telecommunications Research Establishment, and its successor the Royal Radar Establishment, the country's largest secret defence research facility with around 4,000 civil servants and military personnel, and the listed company it became (as of 2011), QinetiQ.

The Malvern Hills, a designated Area of Outstanding Natural Beauty, have also inspired several poets and novelists.

- Thomas Attwood, was a British banker, economist, politician and Member of Parliament, and campaigner for electoral reform. He died in Malvern, on 9 March 1859.
- Michael P. Barnett, (1929–2012) was a British theoretical chemist and computer scientist; researcher at the Royal Radar Establishment in 1953.
- William Algernon Churchill (1865–1947) British diplomat and art historian retired to Worlfield House, Malvern in early 1920s.
- Nigel Coates, architect, and emeritus professor of the Royal College of Art, and Chair of the Academic Court at the London School of Architecture, grew up in Malvern and was educated at Hanley Castle Grammar School.
- Anne, Charles Darwin's daughter, is buried in the graveyard of Malvern Priory.
- David Davis (1908–1996) BBC radio executive and broadcaster, was born and raised in Malvern.
- Evan Davis, economist, journalist and television presenter, was born in Malvern and grew up in Ashtead, Surrey.
- Anne Diamond, television journalist and presenter, grew up in Malvern.
- Edward Elgar, composer, lived and taught in Great Malvern. He is buried in the graveyard of St Wulstan's Roman Catholic Church in the village of Little Malvern.
- Basil Foster (1882–1959), English cricketer who played 34 first-class matches in the early 20th century, was born in Malvern.
- Rose Garrard (b.1946) Bewdley, Worcestershire, England, is an installation, video and performance artist, sculptor, and author with many of her pieces of statuary permanently installed in various locations of the town. Garrard's works have been exhibited at the Victoria and Albert Museum, the Tate Gallery, the British Council maintained Great Britain pavilion at the 1984 Venice Biennale,
- Julius Harrison (1885–1963), was a contemporary of Elgar, and Professor of Composition at the Royal Academy of Music. He was music director at Malvern College and director of the early Elgar Festivals in Malvern. He lived in Pickersleigh Road from most of the 1940s.
- Charles Hastings, founder of the British Medical Association, spent his final years at Hastings House, Barnards Green.
- Graeme Hick, cricketer, currently resides in the Malvern area, and coaches at Malvern College.
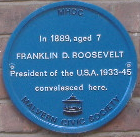
  Roosevelt plaque, Aldwyn Tower, Malvern
- Dorothy Howell (1898 – 1982), composer ('the English Strauss') and was a contemporary of Elgar, lived and taught in Malvern. She is also buried in the graveyard of St Wulstan's Church in the village of Little Malvern.
- Elsie Howey, suffragette, lived most of her life and died in Malvern.
- Nigel Kennedy, violinist and composer, and his Polish wife Agnieszka, have a home in Malvern.
- William Langland's allegorical narrative poem Piers Plowman (written c.1360–1387) begins on the Malvern Hills.
- C. S. Lewis, novelist, was a pupil at the preparatory school Cherbourg House and Malvern College. He boarded at these two establishments between early 1911 and June 1914.
- Jenny Lind, opera singer, lived and died in Malvern, and is buried in Great Malvern cemetery.
- Cher Lloyd, singer, songwriter, X Factor finalist, and model.
- Caroline Lucas, British politician of the Green Party of England and Wales, was born and raised in Malvern.
- Ellen Marriage, Balzac translator, died in Malvern in 1946.
- Jamie McKelvie, British comic book artist and writer. His work Suburban Glamour was set in a fictional version of Malvern
- David Mitchell, author whose works include Cloud Atlas (also a 2012 Hollywood movie) and Black Swan Green, the latter taking place in Malvern. Mitchel was educated at Hanley Castle Grammar School.
- Malcolm Nokes (1897–1986), teacher, soldier, Olympic medalist, nuclear scientist, and an official of the Middle East Treaty Organization (METO)
- Jeremy Paxman, journalist, author, broadcaster, presenter of University Challenge, was educated at Malvern College
- Charles William Dyson Perrins, (1864–1958), art collector, philanthropist and local government office holder.
- Charles Ranken, chess champion, lived in Malvern from 1871 until his death in 1905.
- Evie Richards, GB cycling team (Mountain Bike), Tokyo Olympics.
- George Sayer (1914 – 2005) was a teacher at Malvern College and biographer of C. S. Lewis.
- Haile Selassie, emperor of Ethiopia, visited Malvern during his 1936–1941 exile, staying at the Abbey Hotel and attending the Holy Trinity Church.
- Jacqui Smith, politician, former British Home Secretary, was born and raised in Malvern.
- Rosie Spaughton, English YouTuber from duo Rose and Rosie
- Philip Woodward (1919–2018), mathematician, worked on radar and related topics at the Royal Radar Establishment for 40 years, and also made major contributions to horology.
