= Places of worship in Malvern, Worcestershire =

Places of worship

Among the places of worship in the town and area of Malvern, Worcestershire are centres of dedication to many faiths and denominations. The town has 31 Christian churches with 11 belonging to the Church of England, ranging from low church to high Anglo-Catholic, two Roman Catholic, one Evangelical, and the others being Non-Conformist and other faiths. Its oldest place of worship is the almost cathedral sized parish church of Great Malvern Priory which is all that remains of the former 10th century abbey in central Malvern, which according to the Worcester Monastic Annals, work began in 1085. The chain of Malvern Hills lies in a north-south direction, thus posing a challenge for the architects of Christian churches located on the steep slopes, chancels being traditionally sited at the east end of the building. Many churches were built in the 19th century concomitant with the rapid expansion of the town due to its popularity as a spa. A few modern buildings such as St Mary's Church (1960) in Sherrard's Green, have been constructed in the second half of the 20th century, and some churches, notably St Andrews in Poolbrook, have had important modern extensions added during the first decade of the 21st century.

Except for the Bright Earth Temple, as of 2022 there are no facilities for other faiths in Malvern. A synagogue in Worcester was created by Ashkenazi Orthodox evacuees from Birmingham during World War II. However, by 1973 the community had become so small it was not possible obtain a minyan and the remaining members voted the community out of existence. The nearest synagogues are the four in Birmingham. The small Three Counties Liberal Jewish Community serves Gloucestershire, Herefordshire and Worcestershire holding services in various locations throughout the counties. There are two established mosques in Worcester serving the Muslim community. The nearest Sikh gurdwaras are located in Birmingham, Smethwick, and Leamington. Hindu temples for the region and the nearest venues for other faiths are mainly in the Birmingham - Black Country - Coventry area.

All institutions are listed in alphabetical order by faith, denomination and facility. Some link to their more complete Wikipedia pages.

== Church of England ==
=== All Saints Church ===
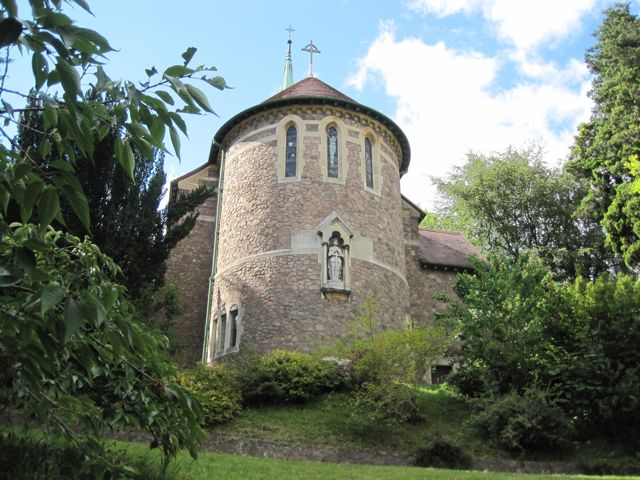

Style of worship: Open evangelical
All Saints remains as one of two C of E churches in Malvern Wells following the closure of St Peter's Gothic style church designed by Robert Jearrad (1836). Built in 1930 in 13th-century style in Malvern rag-stone by architect Troyte Griffith of Nevinson & Newton, to whom Sir Edward Elgar dedicated an Enigma Variation, it is located on steep sloping common land donated by Lady Emily Foley, it has a semicircular apsidal chancel which demonstrates the architectural challenges of east-facing chancels on the flanks of the Malvern Hills, and an organ by Nicholsons.
Location: Wells Road, The Wyche, Malvern Wells
Built: 1903
Architecture: 13th-century style.
Architect: Troyte Griffith
Organ: Nicholson & Co Ltd.
Bells: One, in a small turret.
Notable people in cemetery:
Parish:Malvern Wells and Wyche, part of the Chase Team Ministry
Incumbents: Current incumbent as of 6 October 2024: Rev. Emily Spencer, Vicar of the Malvern Chase Team Ministry (St Andrew’s, All Saints, St Marys); Rev. Dave Bruce (Chase Team Rector)
Further reading: Roden, Hugh C. B. (1923) A guide to All Saints' Church, the Wyche, Malvern. W. H. Lovel, Malvern. OL17391375M

=== Great Malvern Priory, Church of St Mary & St Michael ===
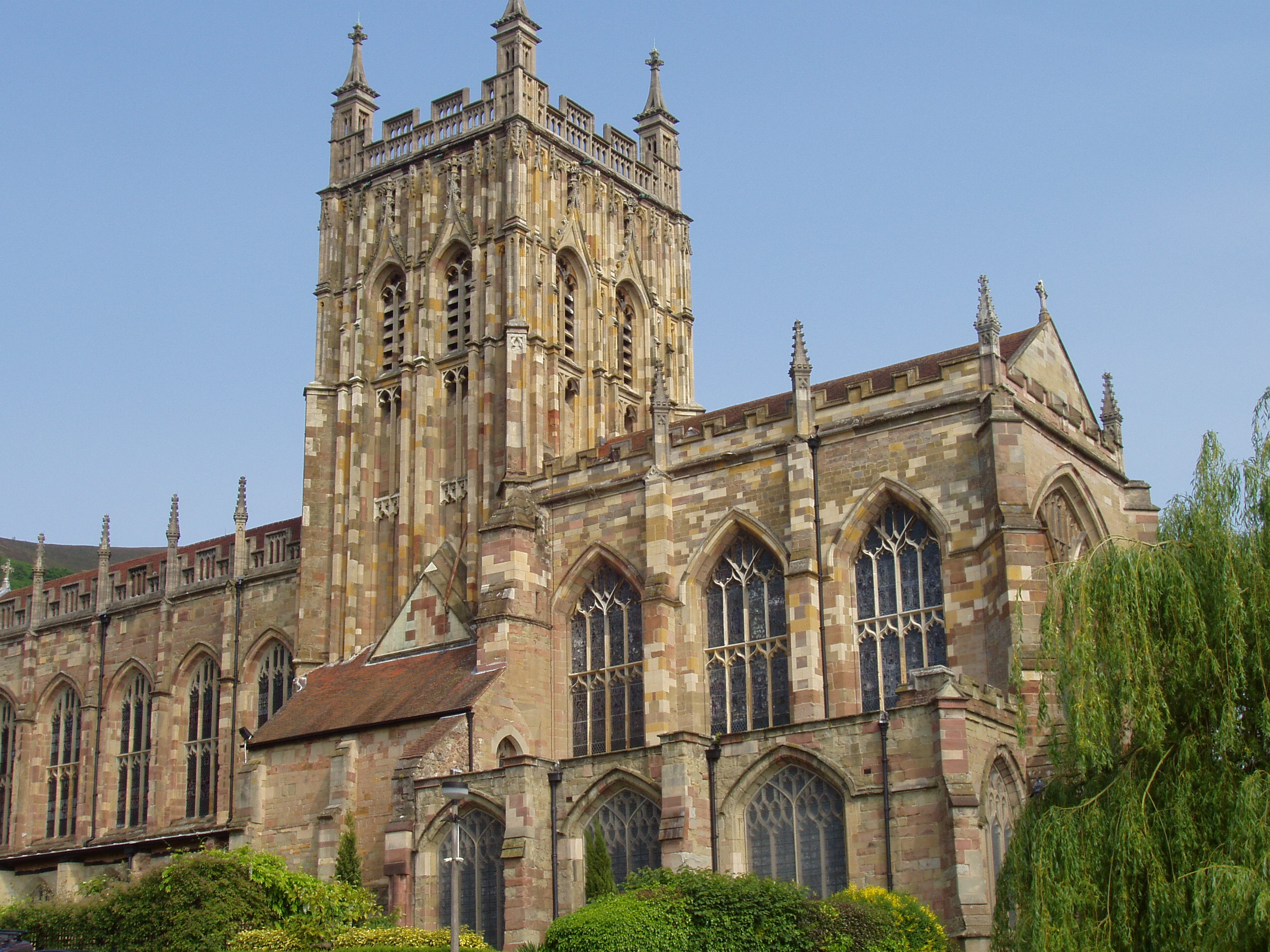

Style of worship: Anglican. Holy Communion (Book of Common Prayer)
Location: Church Street, Great Malvern
Built: from 1085
Architecture: Norman, and 1440 Perpendicular.. Grade I listed. one of the largest non-cathedral parish churches in England and one of the country's Major Parish Churches in the Major Churches Network. 15th century stained glass windows.
Organ: Built by Nicholson of Malvern from 1879. Rebuilt and restored by Rushworth and Dreaper in 1927 and 1977. Further overhauled by Nicholson in 2003 and is a Certified Historic Organ.
Bells: Ring of 11, earliest Cast c.1350 by John of Gloucester.
Parish: Great Malvern, Deanery of Malvern and Upton.
Incumbent: As of October 2024 Rev. Roger Latham, Vicar.

=== Christ Church ===
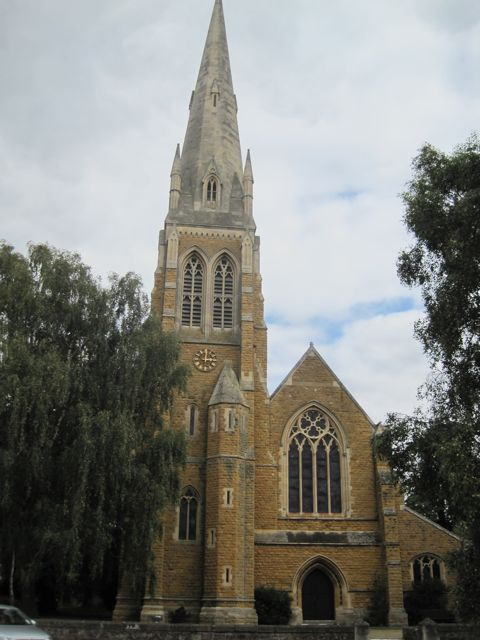
South door, Christ Church

Style of worship: Standard Church Of England liturgy, 'relaxed and informal'.
Location: Avenue Road, Great Malvern, within 200 metres of Great Malvern station and Malvern St James independent girls school.
Parish: Christ Church.
Built: 1875, the church is a Grade II listed building, and an English Heritage grant (2015) aided place of worship,
Architecture: Designed and built by T D Barry & Sons of Liverpool to seat 700 people, its architecture is based on pure 14th century Gothic style with a 55-metre spire and an east window by Charles Eomer Kemp.
Organ: 1,486 pipe organ constructed by Nicholsons of Malvern in 1884, restored and repaired in 1971 and 1986.
Bells: Two bells in the tower, a 6 cwt in C, and a 7 cwt in D were cast by John Taylor & Co, Loughborough in 1875.
Notable people in graveyard: The church does not have its own graveyard; burials take place in the nearby Great Malvern cemetery in Madresfield Road.
Incumbent: vacant (2022). Services are held by retired clergy and others

=== Church of the Ascension ===
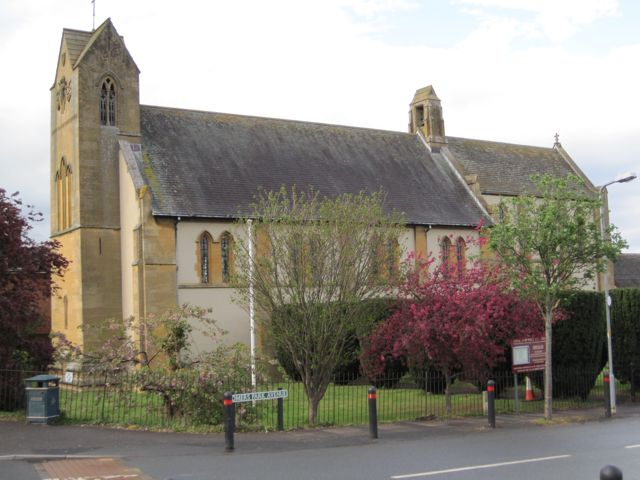
Church of the Ascension

Style of worship: 'Forward-looking Church of England using a modern Catholic liturgy based on an inclusive, liberal theology'.
Location: Somers Park Avenue, Link Top.
Parish: Malvern Link with Cowleigh. One of the three churches in the parish that also includes St Matthias' Church in Malvern Link and St Peter's Church in Cowleigh.
Built: 1903. Grade II listed building (1991)
Architecture: Early English Gothic by Gothic revival architect Sir Walter Tapper, his first church. Early English style in Cotswold stone with lancet windows, featuring a stone relief of the Ascension by Harry Hems. Modeled on a 13th century Cistercian monastery, the building is noted for its acoustics and is a regular venue for choirs and Gregorian chants.
Bells: none. The former two bells were sold in the 1960s to raise funds
Notable people in cemetery: no consecrated cemetery
Current incumbent: As of 22 April 2018, The Rev. Phillip Johnson, vicar. Rev. James Williams, Priest-in-Charge (2024)
Affiliations: Progressive Christianity Network Britain.
Church web site: Not available

=== Holy Trinity ===
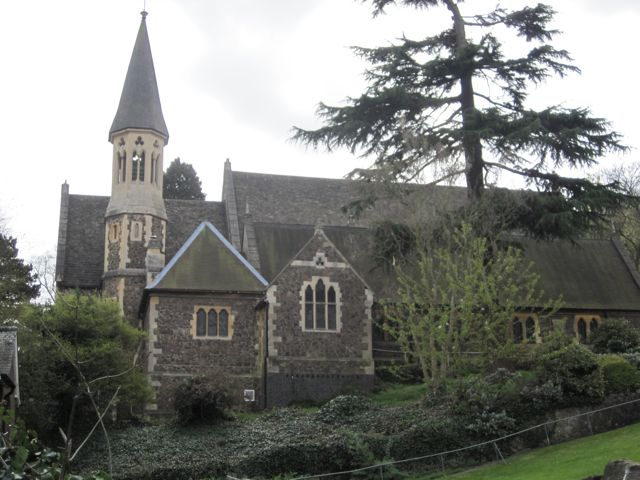
Holy Trinity Church

Location: Link Top, North Malvern
Parish: North Malvern, Diocese of Worcester
Built: 1850-51 as a Chapel of Ease to Malvern Priory, It became its own parish in 1869. Expanded 1872, 1896-7, 1908-9 (Grade II Listed)
Architecture: Early Decorated/Early English by Samuel Daukes, London, with influences of the Oxford Movement
Bells: 2
Organ by Nicholson & Co Ltd of Worcester, 1878. Later organs (electronic), 1975, 1988, by Makin Organs. The current organ is a three manual Viscount digital church organ installed in 2018.
Notable people in cemetery:
Current incumbent: As of 2022, Rev Rebecca Elliott, vicar

=== St Andrew's Church ===
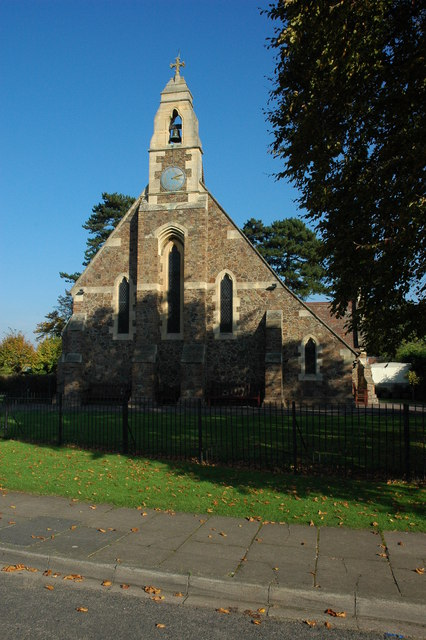
St Andrew's, Poolbrook

Style of worship: Open evangelical
Location: Poolbrook
Parish: Malvern Wells and Wyche, part of the Malvern and Upton Deanery
Built:1882 by Sir Arthur Blomfield in memory of a member of the Chance Brothers glassware family.
Architecture: by G. Lewis Sheppard in 13th century style (Early English).
Bells: 1
Notable people in cemetery:
Current incumbent as of 6 October 2024: Rev. Emily Spencer, Vicar of the Malvern Chase Team Ministry (St Andrew’s, All Saints, St Marys)

=== St Giles Church (Little Malvern Priory) ===
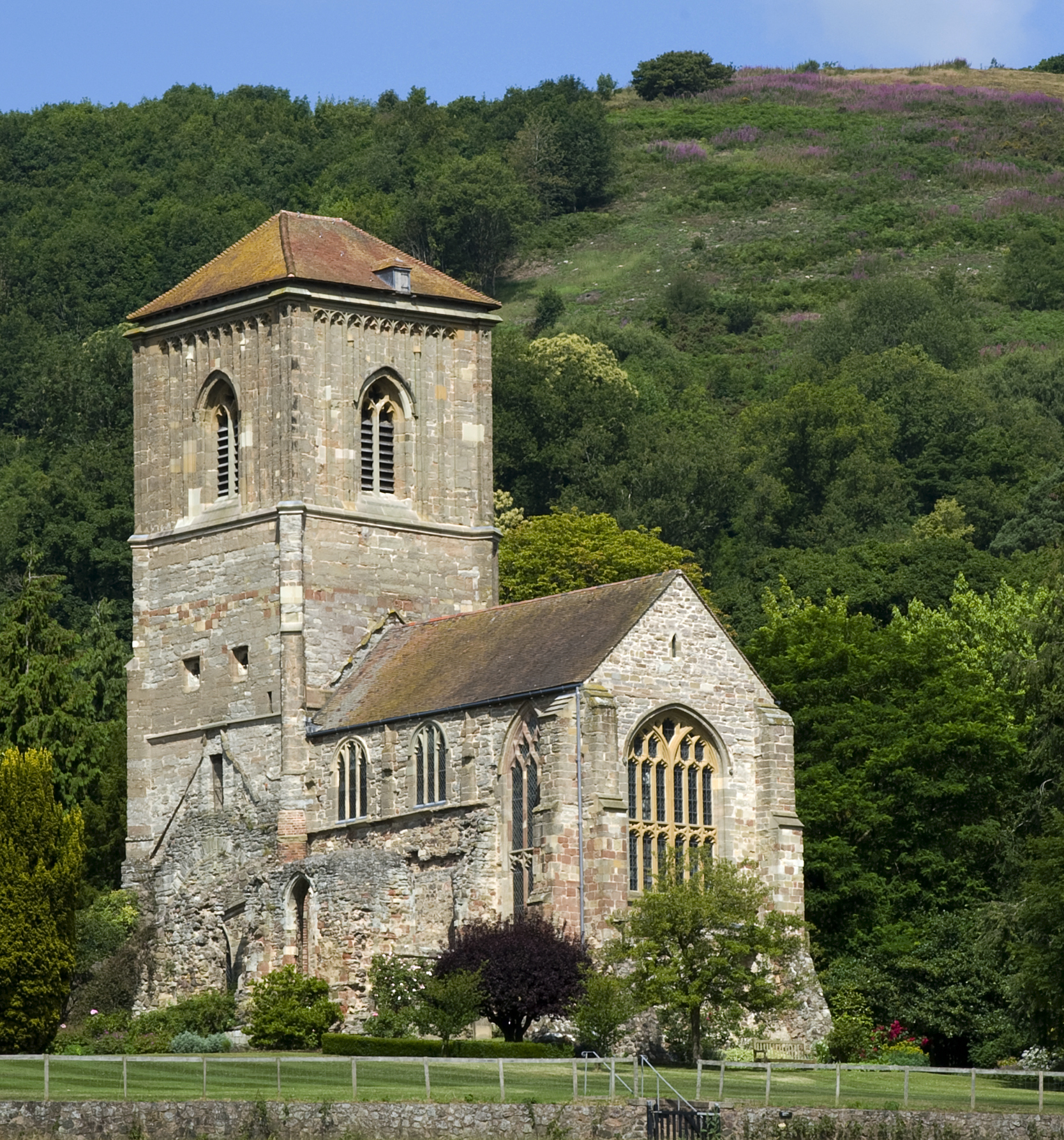
Little Malvern Priory Church.

Style of worship: Holy Communion every Sunday. Modern language Church of England ‘Common Worship’ liturgy.
Location: Little Malvern
Grade I listed (1968)
Parish: Little Malvern
Built: 1125
Architecture: was part of a Benedictine Priory founded in 1171. 14th-15th centuries and has some Norman remains.
Bells: 1 by John of Gloucester ca. 1354
Organ: 1882 by William Hill & Sons, London. Refurbished 2018–19 by Nicholson & Co Ltd
Windows: Stained glass, 1480
Notable people in cemetery:
Current incumbent: Revd. Stephen Sealy (Non-Stipendiary Incumbent)

=== St James's ===
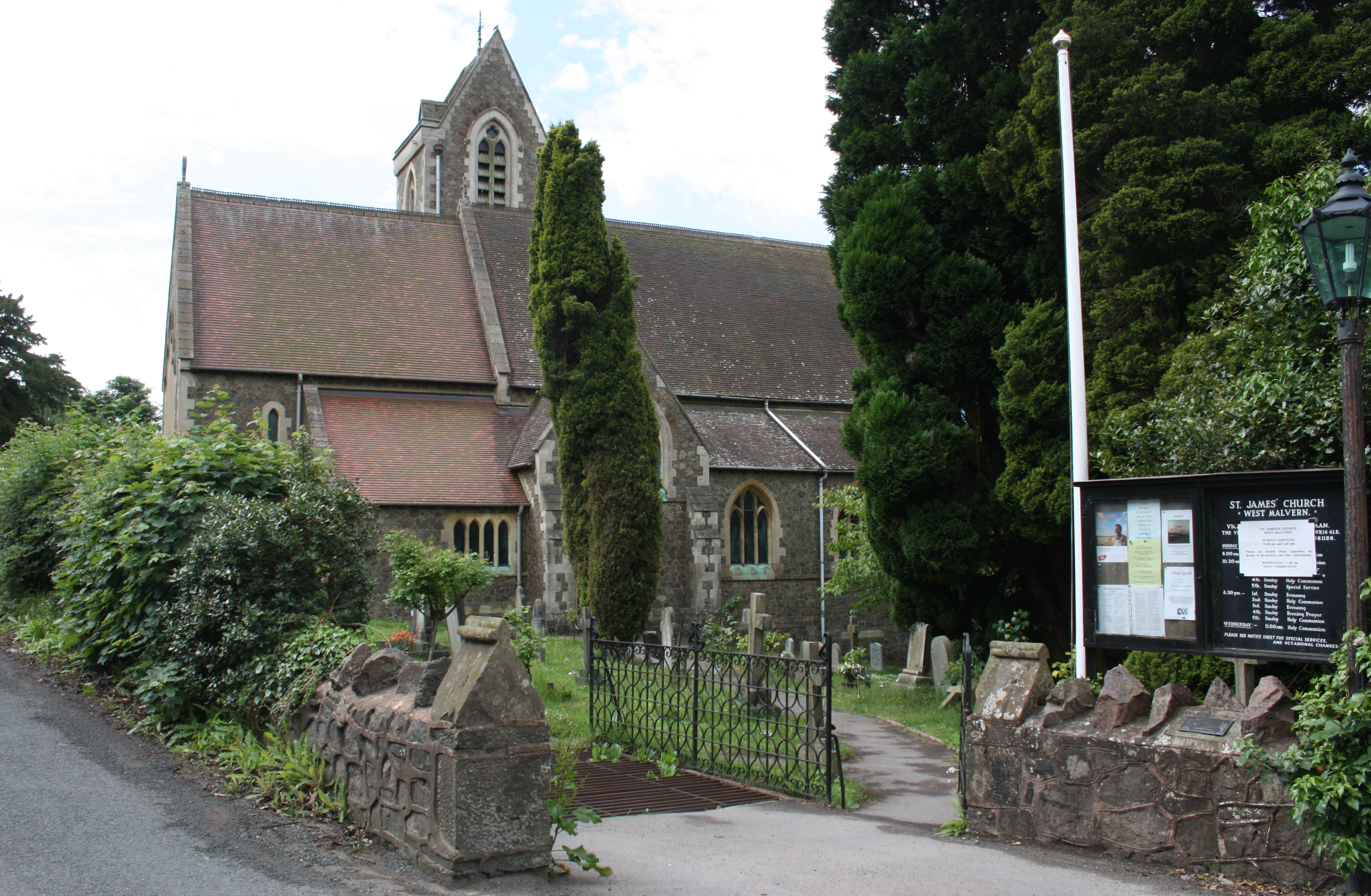
St. James Church, West Malvern

Style of worship: Traditional Common Worship Holy Communion with hymns.
Location: West Malvern
Parish: West Malvern St. James (Benefice of Malvern Holy Trinity and St James West Malvern), Archdeaconry & Diocese of Worcester. Originally 'Mathon St. James', renamed 1844
Grade II listed (1949)
Built:1885
Architecture: 13th century style (Early English). Malvern ragstone with ashlar dressings
Bells:1
Notable people in cemetery: Peter Mark Roget (1869) of Roget's Thesaurus
Current incumbent: The Revd Rebecca Elliott, vicar (as of January 2021)

=== St Leonard ===
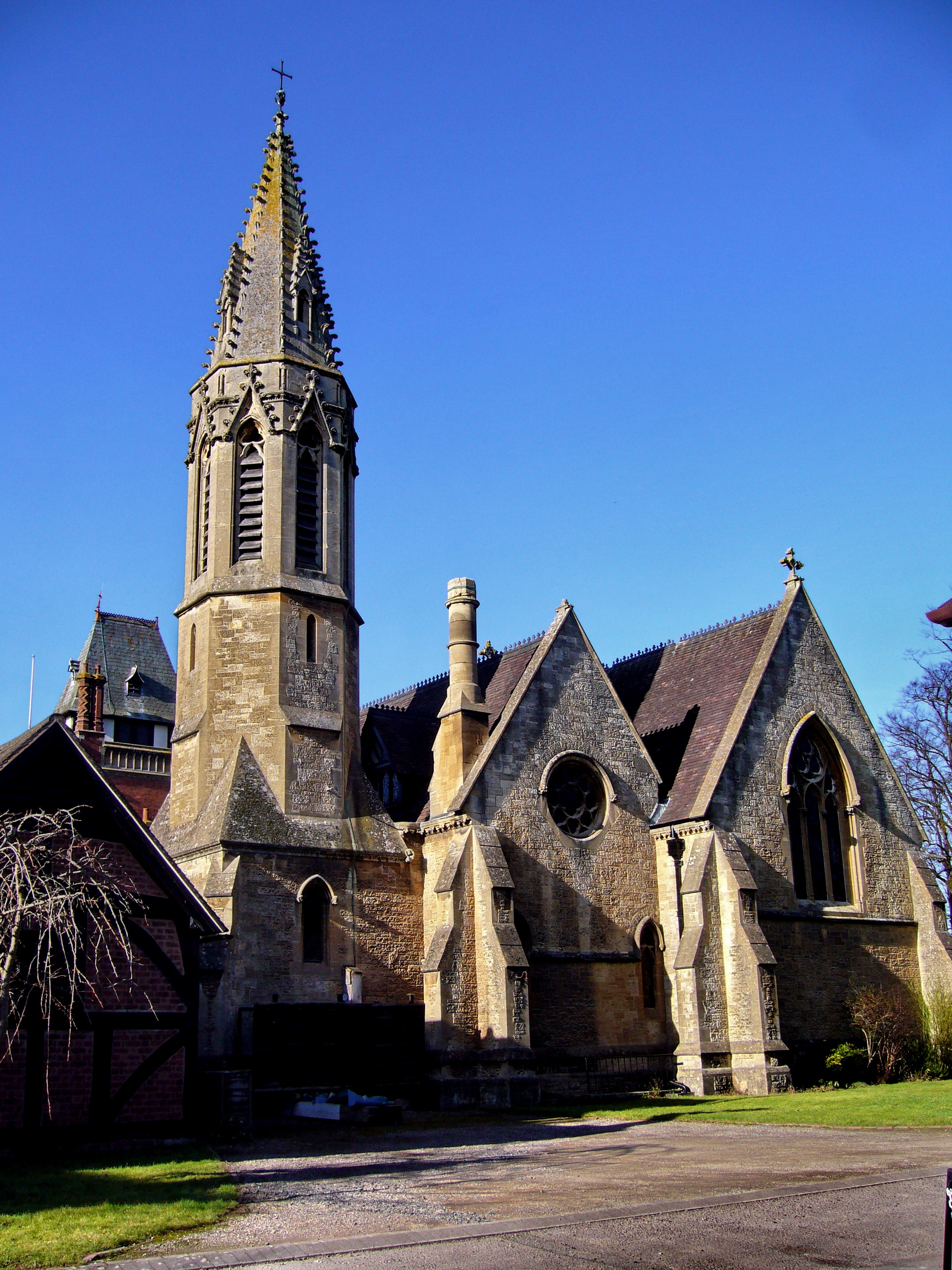
St Leonard's Newland

Style of worship: High Church (Anglo-Catholic). Built as an Anglo-Catholic church and maintains its tradition of Oxford Movement ceremony, liturgy and worship
Location: Newland
Parish: Former parish church of Newland, in 1998 it became the private chapel of the Beauchamp Community. Open to everyone.
Built:1862. Grade I listed
Architecture: 14th century style by Philip Hardwick(p. 17), Gambier Parry fresco technique by Clayton and Bell
Bells:
Notable people in cemetery:
Current incumbent: As of 1 December 2024 Rev. Angie Watts, Chaplain.

=== St Mary's Church, Pickersleigh ===
Location: Sherrards Green Road, Malvern
Parish: Pickersleigh (a new parish created in September 2014).
Built: 1958, originally as a chapel of ease for Christ Church to serve the many council estates in the area.
Architecture: Mid 20th century
Bells: None
Notable people in cemetery: No cemetery.
Incumbent: As of 6 October 2024: Rev. Emily Spencer, Vicar, part of the Malvern Chase Team Ministry (St Andrew’s, All Saints, St Mary's); Rector Rev. Dave Bruce

=== St Mary's ===
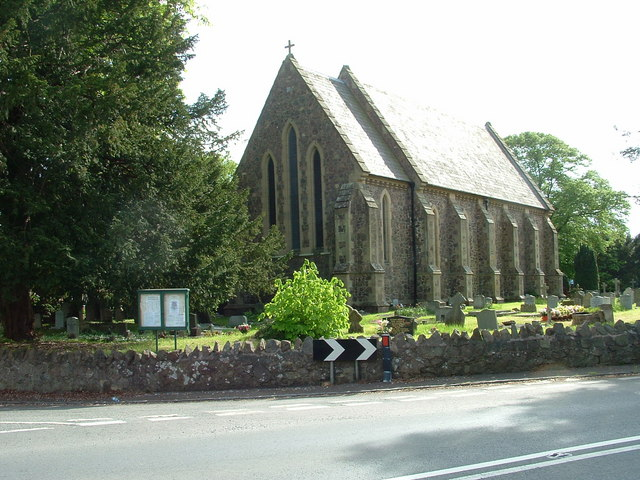
St. Mary's Guarlford

Location: Guarlford Road, Guarlford
Style of worship: BCP with hymns and Common Worship
Parish: First built as St Mary's Barnards Green, a chapel of ease of Great Malvern Priory. Parish Church in 1866. Benefice of Powick and Guarlford and Madresfield with Newland, 1999.
Built: 1844 by George McCann, Malvern. Grade II listed
Architecture: designed by Thomas Bellamy of London.
Bells: none
Notable people in cemetery:
Current vicar/priest/minister: The Rev. Gary Crellin, Vicar (as of 2020)

=== St Mary the Virgin ===
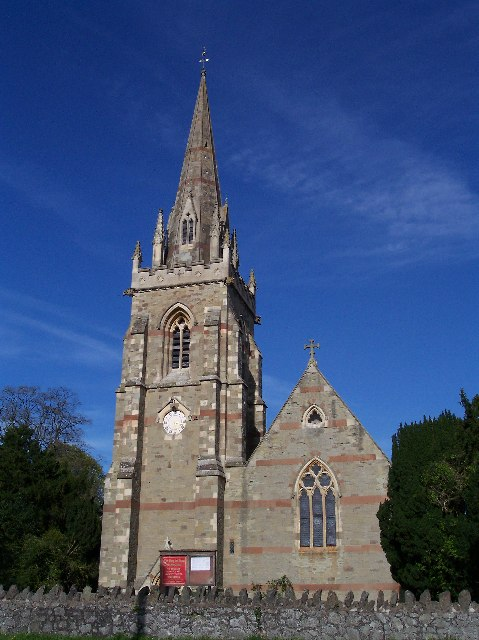
St. Mary's, Madresfield

Location: Madresfield
Style of worship: BCP with hymns and Common Worship

Benefice of Powick and Guarlford and Madresfield with Newland, 1999.

Built: 1867. Grade II listed
Architecture: designed by Frederick Preedy in 14th century style, with stained glass windows.

Bells: peal of 6 bells cast by Taylor of Loughborough
Notable people in cemetery:
Current vicar/priest/minister: The Rev. Gary Crellin, Rector (as of 2020)

=== St Matthias' Church ===
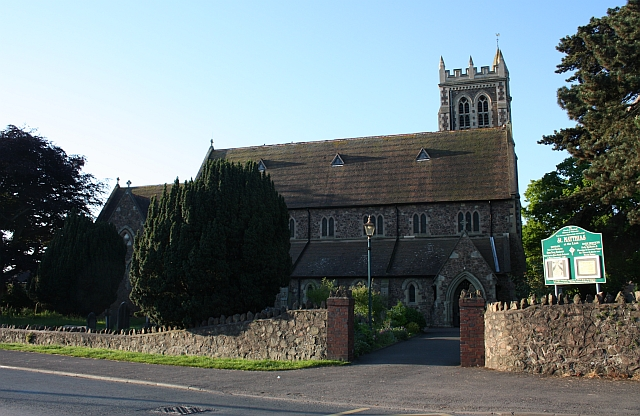
St. Mathias, Malvern Link

Style of worship: 'Forward-looking Church of England using a modern Catholic liturgy based on an inclusive, liberal theology'.
Location: Church Road, Malvern Link
Parish: Malvern Link with Cowleigh (with St Peters and the Church of the Ascension).
Built: 1844 by Mc.Cann, Malvern. Tower added 1898–9 by Collins & Godfrey of Tewkesbury. Grade II Listed
Architecture: Victorian Gothic Revival. Designed by Sir George Gilbert Scott, and Harvey Eginton of Worcester

Organ: Built 1873 by Nicholson. Restored 1990 and 2005 by Trevor Tipple.

Bells: 10, cast by John Taylor & Co of Loughborough. #10 in 1899, 3 to 9 in 1900 and #1 and 2 added in 1994. The Tenor weighs 16 cwt and is tuned to F#. The first full peal of Grandsire Triples was rung on 1 June 1901 in St Matthias See also: Stedman Triples rung at St Matthias
Notable people in cemetery:
Incumbents (parish): As of 2024 Rev. James Williams, Priest-in-Charge; Rev. Dr Alastair McKay, Associate Priest
Affiliations: Progressive Christianity Network Britain.

=== St Peter's Church, Cowleigh ===
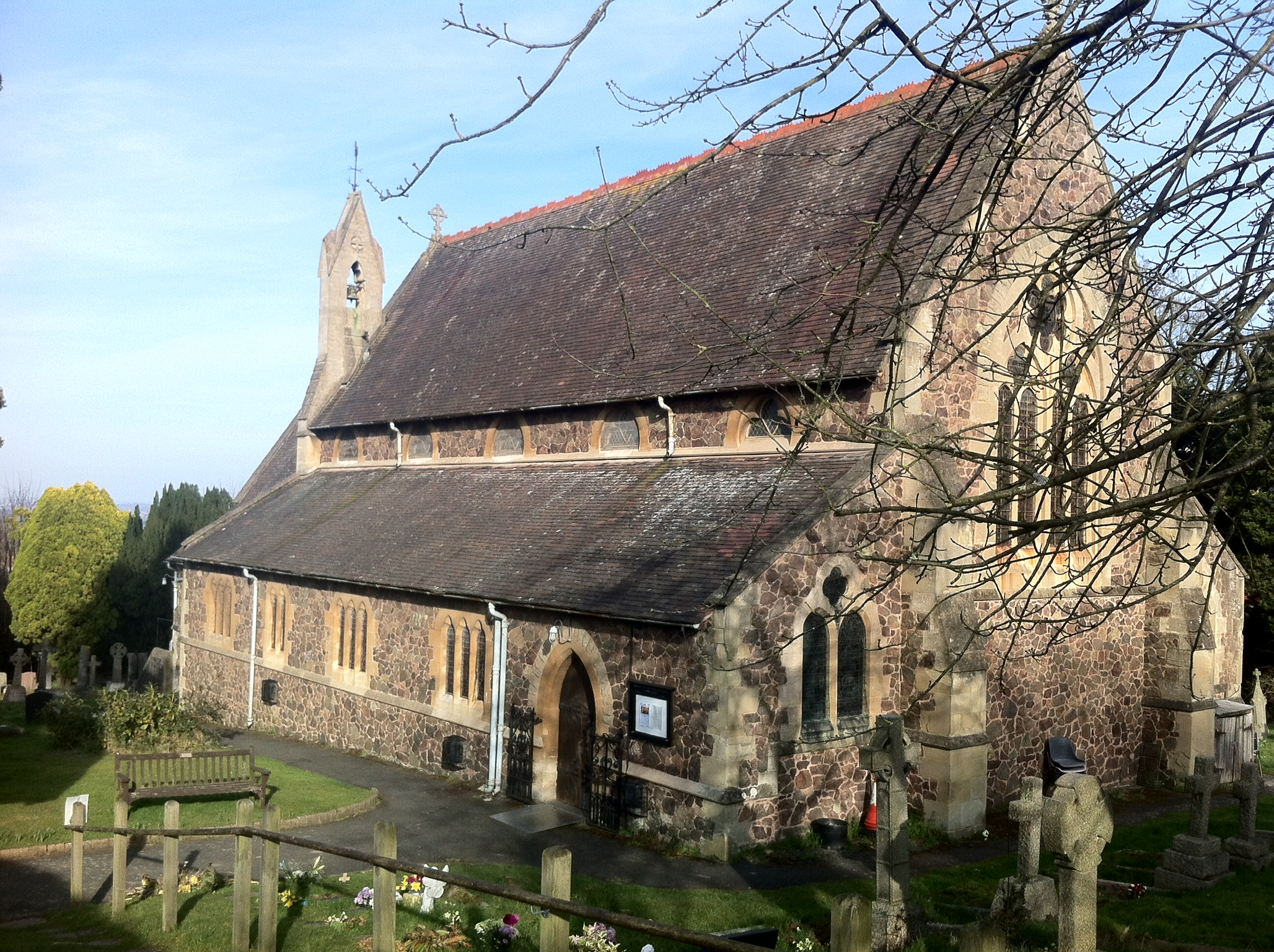
St. Peters, Cowleigh

Style of worship: 'Forward-looking Church of England using a modern Catholic liturgy based on an inclusive, liberal theology'.
Location: Cowleigh Bank, North Malvern
Parish: Malvern Link with Cowleigh (with the Church of the Ascension and St Matthias)
Built:. 1865. Grade II listed.
Architecture: George Edmund Street. Designed in the High Church Anglican (Oxford Movement) tradition, built in local ragstone with stained glass windows
Bells:
Notable people in cemetery:
Incumbent(s): Parish team ministry. As of 2024 Rev. James Williams, Curate-in-Charge; Rev. Dr Alastair McKay, Associate Priest
Affiliations: Progressive Christianity Network Britain.

== Protestant, Reformist, other denominations ==
=== Baptist ===
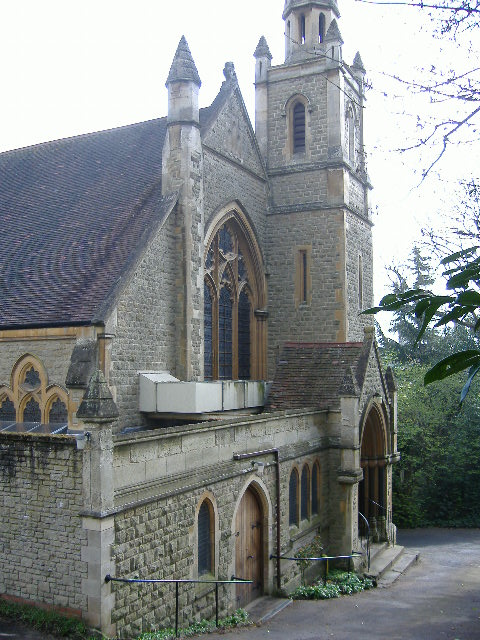
Malvern Baptist Church

Malvern Baptist Church
Style of worship: Baptist
Location: Abbey Road, Great Malvern
Affiliation: Heart of England Baptist Association / Baptist Union of Great Britain.
Built:1894.
Architecture: Traditional church building in Victorian nonconformist geometric Gothic style by George Ingall of Birmingham.
Bells: None
Notable people in cemetery: No consecrated churchyard
Current incumbent: Rev Dave Clarke, minister (as of 2020)

=== United Reformed Church ===
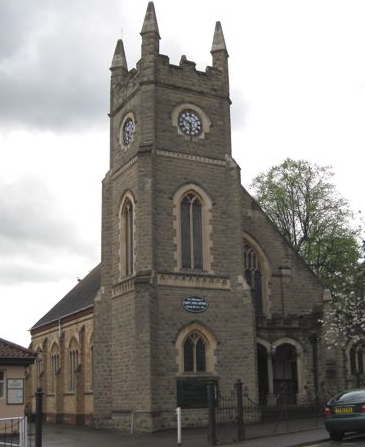
United Reform Church, Malvern Link

Malvern Link, Worcester Road
Founded 1903 as Malvern Link Free Church (Countess of Huntingdon's Connexion)
Parish/Affiliation: The West Midlands Synod
Minister: Reverend Ken Martin (as of 2020)

Holly Mount

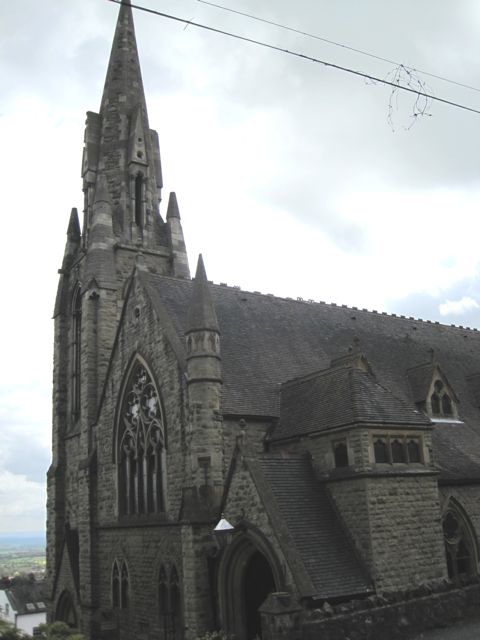
Holly Mount URC, Queen's Drive, Great Malvern

Founded 1876
The congregation relocated 2019 to hold Sunday worship at The Cube, Albert Road North, a community centre, with other activities now held at the URC Church in Malvern Link and the Lyttelton Well Rooms in Malvern.
Organisation/Affiliation: Malvern and Worcester team pastorate
Minister:
In July 2021, plans were submitted to Malvern District Council to convert the former Holly Mount church, a grade-II listed building, into three residential units.

=== Methodist ===
==== Landsdowne Crescent Methodist Church ====
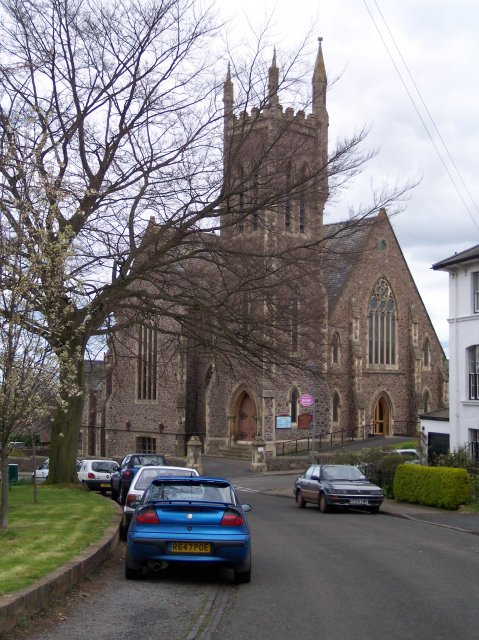
Landsdown Methodist Church, Great Malvern

Style of worship: Methodist
Location: Great Malvern, Landsdown Crescent
Parish: South West Worcestershire Circuit. Member of Churches Together in Malvern

Built: 1866
Architecture: Gothic Revival, by John Tarring of London.
Bells: none
Notable people in cemetery:
Current incumbent: Rev Nigel Coke-Woods, minister (as at 2020)

==== Somers Park Avenue Methodist Church ====
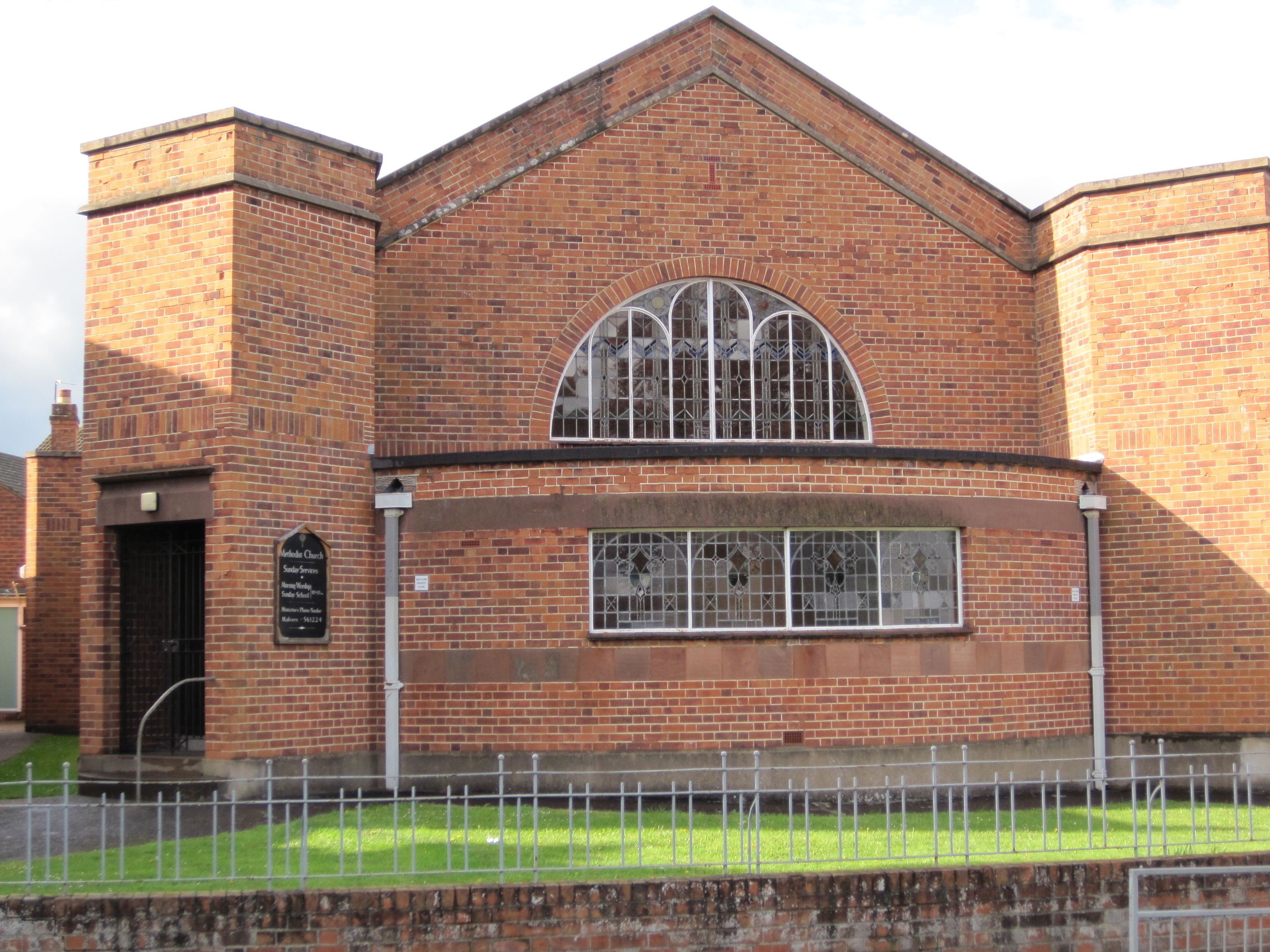
Somers Park Avenue Methodist Church

Style of worship: Methodist
Location: Malvern Link
Founded on current site: 1880s
Parish: South West Worcestershire Circuit. Member of Churches Together in Malvern
Built: Current building: 1936. Expanded 1960–61
Architecture: Modern 20th century (1936) with part stained glass windows
Organ: A 1949 a pipe organ was replaced by an Allen electronic organ in 1986
Bells: none
Notable people in cemetery:
Current incumbent: Rev. Nigel Coke-Woods, minister (as at 2020)

=== Evangelical ===
==== Malvern Evangelical Church ====
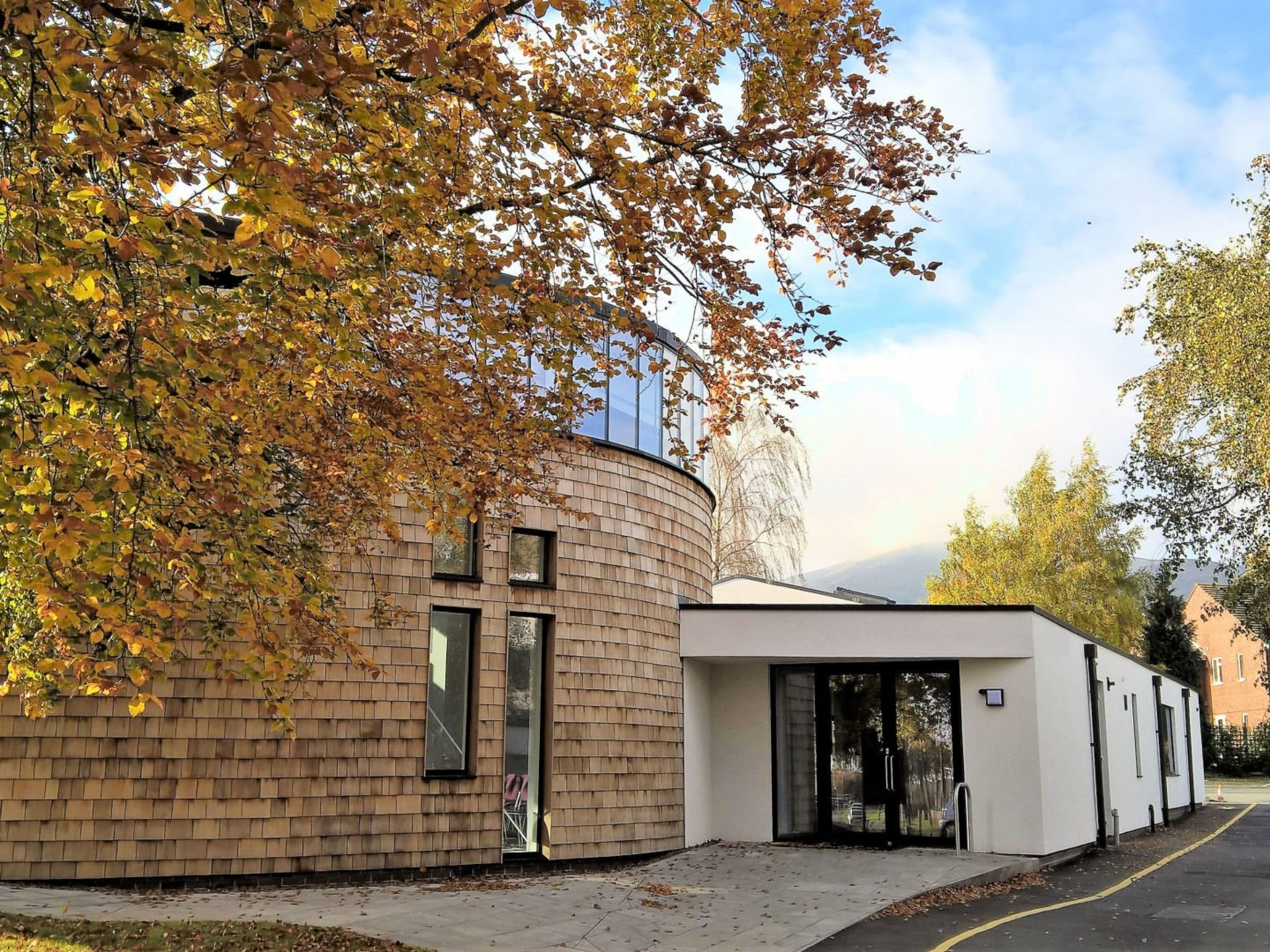
Malvern Evangelical Church

Style of worship: Evangelicalism. Meetings every Sunday.
Location: 204-208 Pickersleigh Road, Malvern WR14 2QX
Founded: 1969
Current Building built: 2015
Architecture: Modern 21st century.
Affiliations: Evangelical Alliance
Incumbent: Roy Bourner, pastor

=== Non-aligned ===
Eden Church
Building: Repurposed modern commercial premises, 2010

Style of worship: Sunday family gatherings with praise, live music, and invited guest speakers. Leader: Mike Dibbens
Location: Eden Centre (since 2015), Grovewood Road, Malvern

== Catholic ==
=== St Joseph's Church ===
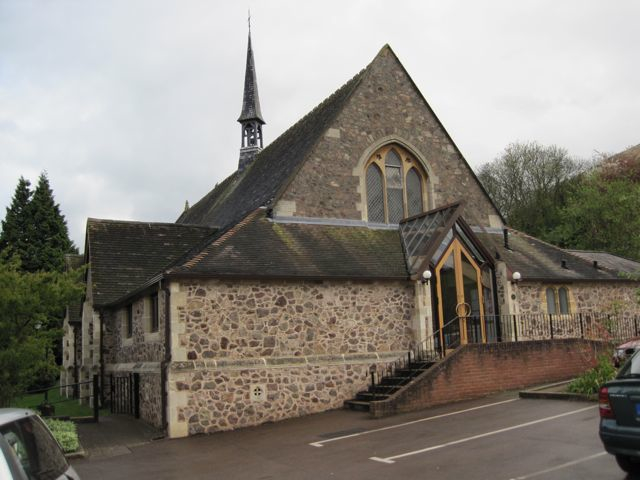
St Joseph's Catholic Church

Style of worship: Roman Catholic Mass
Location: 1245 Newtown Road, Link Top, Malvern, WR14 1PF
Parish: St Joseph, Malvern. Archdiocese of Birmingham
Built: 1876 by Dom Bernard Bulbeck, a monk Expanded: 1997
Architecture:
Incumbent: Fr Naz Mgungwe, parish priest (as at 2020)

=== St Wulstan's Roman Catholic Church ===
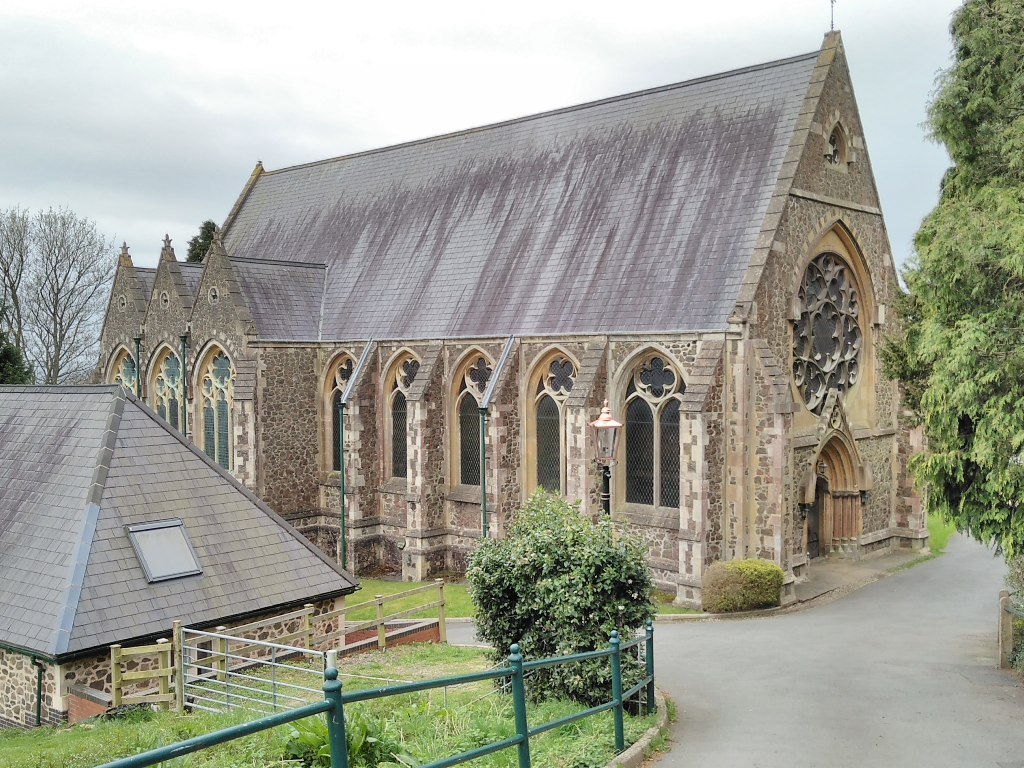
St.Wulstan's Catholic Church

Style of worship: Mass, Adoration. Benedictine with Gregorian Chant. Sacrosanctum Concilium ( Vatican 2 Decree on the Liturgy)
Location: Wells Rd, Little Malvern, Worcestershire WR14 4JL,
Parish: St Wulstan, Catholic Diocese of Birmingham (Worcester Deanery),
Built: 1862. Major restoration in 2003/4, aided by a grant from English Heritage.
Architecture: 13th century French Gothic style.
Bells:
Organ: by John Nicholson, brought to the church around 1870. Refurbished/restored 1974, 1981, 2017
Notable people in cemetery: Sir Edward Elgar, English composer; Dorothy Howell, English composer
Parish Priest: Fr. Thomas Regan OSB, parish priest (as at 2024)

== Christadelphian ==
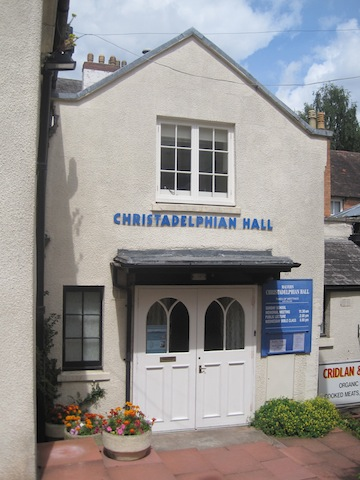
Christadelphian Hall, Malvern

Style of worship: Christadelphianism / Biblical unitarianism
Christadelphian Hall
Location: 21 Abbey Road, Great Malvern
Incumbent: Christadelphians ("ecclesias") do not have permanently appointed preachers

== Interdenominational ==
Wyche Free Church
Style of worship: independent evangelical church
Location: Jubilee Drive, Upper Colwall, Malvern
Founded: ca. 1850
Parish: self-governing
Affiliation: FIEC - Fellowship of Independent Evangelical Churches
Built: present church built in 1910
Architecture: Designed by Harold Seymour Scott and opened in 1911. Memorial window by A. J. Davies of Bromsgrove.
Bells:
Notable people in cemetery: No consecrated churchyard
Elders (2020): Peter Goodbury, Rev John Grindell. Pastor: None (2020), weekly ministry of experienced visiting preachers.

== Non-Denominational ==
=== Christian Science ===
The Great Malvern Christian Science Society
Location: Poolbrook Village Hall, Poolbrook Road, Malvern, WR14 3JW

=== Jehovah's Witnesses ===
Location: Kingdom Hall, 1 Orford Way, Malvern, WR14 2EH

=== Quakers ===
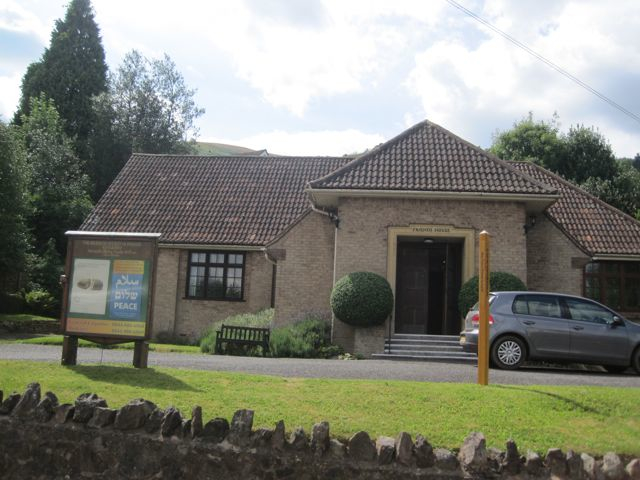
Friends Meeting House, Malvern

Friends Meeting House
Style of worship: no programmed services, but Sunday meetings for worship
Location: 1 Orchard Road, Malvern, WR14 3DA
Parish/Group: Worcestershire & Shropshire Area Meeting, Religious Society of Friends
Built: 1938.
Architecture: Designed by JR Armstrong, one of the Bournville Village architects.
Clerking Team: Elizabeth & Kevin Rolph and Melanie Jameson
Elders: Paul Wyatt, Judith Badman, Jill Etheridge, Richard Bartholomew

=== The Salvation Army ===
Style of worship: Christian, various
Location: 62 Newtown Road, Link Top, Malvern WR14 1NZ
Parish: N/A
Built: N/A
Architecture: N/A
Bells: N/A
Notable people in cemetery: N/A

== Buddhist Temple ==
Bright Earth Temple
Location: 34 Worcester Road, Great Malvern
Built: 1820s as a guest house, acquired by Amida Trust, 2014
Style of worship: Mahayana Buddhism with emphasis on Pureland Buddhism.
Orientation: Amidism - Bright Earth Buddhism, a broad branch of Mahayana.
Governance: Amida Trust
Affiliation: European Buddhist Union
Run/managed by Amitabha Fellowship leaders Kaspa and Satya
