= Roger Bekeford =

Roger Bekeford was a member of Dublin Corporation in the later fourteenth century, serving as bailiff on two consecutive terms from 1368 to 1370, and once as mayor in 1384. He is a witness to grants in 1371, 1373, 1382, and 1390 along with the mayor and bailiffs suggesting he was a prominent member of the Common Council. Further evidence for his standing comes from a note of him as one of the gentlemen of counsel for the city of Dublin on 18 October 1381, and again in 1385 he is empaneled on a jury looking into the Tolboll Custom claimed by St. Thomas’ Abbey.

But it is as a landholder under the Archbishop of Dublin that he has perhaps become best known. His grandfather, Simon Neyll has been identified as one of the archbishop's betaghs by later historians, but he certainly wasn't a betagh in the traditional sense of the term. He acted more as a free tenant, being a farmer in Clondolean (where the townland of Neilstown still preserves the name), along with several shops and some lands in New Street in Dublin. He also acquired the lands of Skatterney. On 7 May 1405 Roger Bekeford, son and heir of Elena, daughter and heiress to Simon Neale, remitteds to Thomas, archbishop of Dublin all his rights to these lands.

It has been suggested that Roger Bekeford was a product of intermarriage, ‘Bekeford’s mother was an Ó Néill of Irish descent, while the surname he bears is English, suggesting that his father was of English extraction’. Being of Irish extraction did not hold Simon Neale back, serving as a Jurat of the City of Dublin in 1359, suggesting that Roger's standing within the Common Council was due to the business, property and government interests of his ‘Irish’ grandfather.

Roger seems adept at extending these property interests himself which no doubt placed him in a good position to vie for the main offices of Dublin corporation. So on the 16 May 1379 Richard, son of Adam Clerk, kinsman and heir to Thomas, son of Thomas Smothe, released to Roger Bekeford a messuage and seven shops in the Street of the Fishers, parish of St. Olave. He also extended his holdings in New Street, holding the property formerly held by Peter Wakefield. His standing was further enhanced with his appointment as general attorney for John White, clerk, on 1 April 1375, and again for Richard, Prior of Little Malvern, on 13 October 1389.
