= Dorothy Howell (composer) =

English composer and pianist (1898–1982)

Dorothy Gertrude Howell (25 February 1898 – 12 January 1982) was an English composer and pianist. She received the nickname of the "English Richard Strauss" in her lifetime.

== Early life and education ==
Howell was born in Birmingham, and grew up in Handsworth and Wollescote House, Stourbridge; from a young age, her studies of piano and composition were encouraged by her parents. One of six children, she came from a musical family, and enjoyed playing instruments (mainly violin and piano) and singing together. Her father, Charles Edward Howell, was an ironmaster by trade and self-taught pianist. Her mother, Viola Rosetta Feeny, was the daughter of Alfred Feeny, the Arts and Music Critic for the Birmingham Daily Post. One of her earliest works, a set of six pieces for piano, was written when she was only 13 years old; they were based upon The Tales of Beatrix Potter and Howell's love of nature.

She received a convent education, first in Birmingham, and then in Belgium, and finally at the Notre Dame Convent in Clapham. She much preferred music to her regular academic studies, and began studying at the Royal Academy of Music, at age 15, studying both piano and composition. Her teachers there included John Blackwood McEwen and Tobias Matthay. Her talents were greatly acknowledged by all her teachers at RAM, and she won the Hine Prize for composition of an English Ballad in 1914.

== Lamia and early success ==
Howell achieved fame with her symphonic poem Lamia (inspired by the Keats poem) which Sir Henry Wood premiered at The Proms on 10 September 1919; McEwen introduced Wood to the work. Wood directed Lamia again that same week (on 13 September 1919) and again in six subsequent Proms seasons, but after 1940 the piece was neglected until its revival at the 2010 Proms season. It received a centenary performance at the Proms in 2019. Howell dedicated Lamia on its 1921 publication to Wood. Her nickname of "English Strauss" was written in a press review of Lamia's first Proms performance. The press were very recognizing of Howell's success in the first performances of Lamia, with headlines emphasizing her age and her gender- "Girl Composer's Success" and "Girl Composer's Triumph". After Lamia's initial success, she returned to her family in Birmingham. In December of 1920, The Birmingham Festival Choral Society staged a performance of Lamia, conducted again by Wood.

== Other major works and teaching career ==
Only two years after the initial success of Lamia, Howell's Danse Grotesque was performed at Buckingham Palace in November 1921. She won the Cobbett Prize in 1921 for her Phantasy for violin and piano.

Her professional relationship with Sir Henry Wood remained stable throughout her career. Among other compositions by Howell, Wood conducted the ballet score Koong Shee in 1921, her piano concerto in 1923 and 1927 (with the composer herself as pianist on both occasions). After the premiere of her piano concerto in August 1923, The Daily Mail reported "Girl Composer Plays Solo Part in Her Own Concerto", stating that the work was "of remarkable promise for so young an artist." Her overture, The Rock, was inspired by a visit to Gibraltar, in 1928, and was premiered at the 1928 Proms. In 1940, Wood was scheduled to conduct the first performance of Three Divertissements, her last known orchestral work, but the concert was cancelled owing to The Blitz. The piece did not receive its premiere until the 1950 Elgar Festival in Malvern. Premiere recordings of Koong Shee, The Rock and the Three Divertissements were issued in 2024.

Wood attempted to recruit Howell to his conducting class at the Royal Academy of Music (RAM) in 1923, but she instead became a teacher at the RAM in 1924, working as a professor of Harmony and Composition. Both before coming to RAM and during her tenure there, she was a sought after teacher, teaching at the Tobias Matthay Pianoforte School, the Birmingham School of Music, the Montpellier School of Music in Cheltenham, Rye St. Antony in Oxford, and St. Richard's School in Malvern.

During World War II, she served with the Women's Land Army. She retired from the RAM in 1970, and after her retirement, continued to teach students privately. She died in Malvern, aged 83. Howell tended the grave of Sir Edward Elgar for several years, and herself is buried near Elgar in the churchyard of St Wulstan's Roman Catholic Church, Little Malvern. She is one of the subjects of a 2023 group biography of four women composers by Leah Broad, Quartet: How Four Women Changed the Musical World.

Howell died in Malvern on 12 January 1982.

== Recordings ==
- Chamber Music: Lorraine McAslan (violin), Sophia Rahman (piano). Piano Sonata, Violin Sonata, Five Studies for piano, Humoresque for piano, The Moorings for violin & piano, Phantasy for violin & piano, Rosalind for violin & piano. Dutton CDLX7144 (2004)
- Danza Gaya: Music for Two Pianos, Simon Callaghan, Hiroaki Takenouchi. Includes Recuerdos preciosos Nos. 1 and 2, Mazurka and Spindrift. Lyrita SRCD433 (2024)
- Lamia: Karelia Symphony Orchestra, cond. Marius Stravinsky. British Composers Premiere Collection Vol. 1, Cameo Classics CC9037CD (2014)
- Lamia: BBC Philharmonic, cond. Rumon Gamba. British Tone Poems Vol. 2, Chandos CHAN10981 (2019)
- Orchestral Works: BBC Concert Orchestra, cond. Rebecca Miller. Humoresque, Lamia, Koong Shee, The Rock, Three Divertissements. Signum SIGCD763 (2024)
- Piano Concerto in D minor: Danny Driver, BBC Scottish Symphony Orchestra, cond. Rebecca Miller, Hyperion CDA68130 (2017)
- Piano Concerto in D minor: Valentina Seferinova, Orion Symphony Orchestra, cond. Toby Purser. British Composers Premiere Collection Vol. 4, Cameo Classics CC9041 (2014)
- String Quartet in D minor, Adagio and Caprice, Berkeley Ensemble, EM Records EMR CD091 (2025)

== Selected works ==
- Piano Sonata (1916)
- Lamia (1918, symphonic poem)
- Danse grotesque (1919, for orchestra)
- Spindrift (1920), solo piano or piano duet
- Two Dances (1920, for orchestra)
- Humoresque (1921, for orchestra)
- Koong Shee (1921, revised 1933, for orchestra)
- Minuet (1923 for orchestra)
- Concerto for pianoforte (1923)
- Two Pieces for Muted Strings (1926)
- The Moorings for violin and piano
- Phantasy for violin and piano
- Three Preludes for piano
- The Rock (1928, for orchestra)
- Fanfare (1933) (composed for the Musicians' Benevolent Fund)
- Recuerdos preciosos (Precious Memories) for piano duet, two movements (1934)
- Three Divertissements (1940)
- Violin Sonata (1947)
- Air, Variations & Finale for oboe, violin & piano (1949)
- Piano Sonata (1955)
