= Broadheath =

Broadheath may refer to the following places in England:

- Broadheath (a local government electoral ward in the Borough of Halton, Cheshire)
- Broadheath (a local government electoral ward in Torridge District, Devon)
- Broadheath, Greater Manchester (a suburb of Altrincham)
  - Broadheath (Trafford ward) (a local government electoral ward in the Metropolitan Borough of Trafford, Greater Manchester)
- Lower Broadheath, a village and civil parish in Worcestershire
  - Broadheath (a local government electoral ward in Malvern Hills District, Worcestershire)
