= St Wulstan's Roman Catholic Church =

St Wulstan's, Little Malvern
- Church of St Wulstan
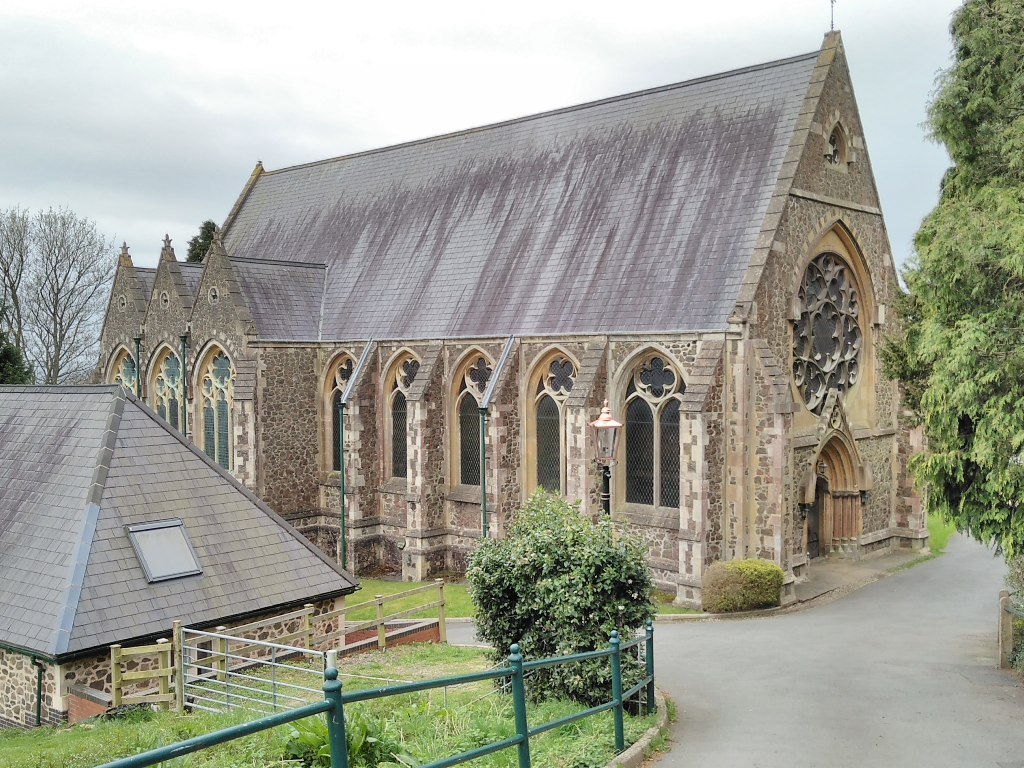

- Location in Worcestershire
- 52.0666°N 2.3356°W
- OS grid reference: SO 77088 40972
- Location: Little Malvern, Worcestershire
- Country: England
- Denomination: Catholic Church
- Religious order: Benedictine Order
- Website: www.saint-wulstans.org.uk

History
- Dedication: St Wulstan
- Dedicated: 1861-1862

Architecture
- Heritage designation: Grade II-listed
- Designated: 23 February 1987
- Architect: Benjamin Bucknall
- Architectural type: Gothic Revival
- Years built: 1862

Administration
- Archdiocese: Birmingham

Clergy
- Archbishop: Bernard Longley
- Priest: Rev. Father Thomas Regan OSB

St Wulstan's Roman Catholic Church, Little Malvern, Worcestershire, England is a Benedictine parish church administered by the monks of Downside Abbey. The attached churchyard contains the grave of the composer Edward Elgar and of his wife, Alice. The church was designed in 1862 in a Gothic Revival style by Benjamin Bucknall. It is a Grade II listed building. The Elgars' grave has a separate Grade II listing.

== History ==
The Benedictines established a monastery at what is now Little Malvern Priory in around 1171. After the Dissolution of the Monasteries, the priory was reduced to the chancel and tower, and other elements were converted and reused in the construction of Little Malvern Court. The court came into the possession of the Berington family in the 18th century, who remain its owners. Staunchly recusant, the Beringtons supported a Catholic congregation at Little Malvern and in 1860 engaged the architect Benjamin Bucknall to construct a new church. The church, completed in 1862, was dedicated to St Wulstan.

In 1920 Alice Elgar, wife of the composer Edward Elgar, was buried in the churchyard at St Wulstan's. The church had been the Elgars' regular place of worship during their time at Craeg Lea, their home at Malvern Wells. (Note: The Elgars were extremely peripatetic, buying and selling around a dozen houses in the Malvern area during their 30-year marriage.) Following his own death in 1934, Elgar himself was interred in the same grave. (Note: Sir Edward Elgar was born in Worcestershire, at Lower Broadheath, where his first home, The Firs, is now the Elgar Birthplace Museum. Elgar spent much of his life in the county and wrote many of his works there.) Their memorial was designed by Arthur Troyte Griffith, a Malvern-based architect and close friend of Elgar, whom Elgar celebrated in Variation VII, “Troyte”, of his Enigma Variations. The composer Dorothy Howell, who for many years tended the Elgar grave on behalf of the Elgar Society, is buried nearby.

The church is now owned and administered by the Benedictine community at Downside Abbey.

== Architecture and description ==
The church is constructed of local Malvern rag-stone with ashlar stone dressings. It comprises a nave and a chancel. An undercroft designed by Bucknall was never built. The church contains stained glass by Hardman & Co., which, as at 2022, is undergoing a major restoration. St Wulstan's is a Grade II listed building. The Elgars' grave has a separate Grade II listing.

== Gallery ==
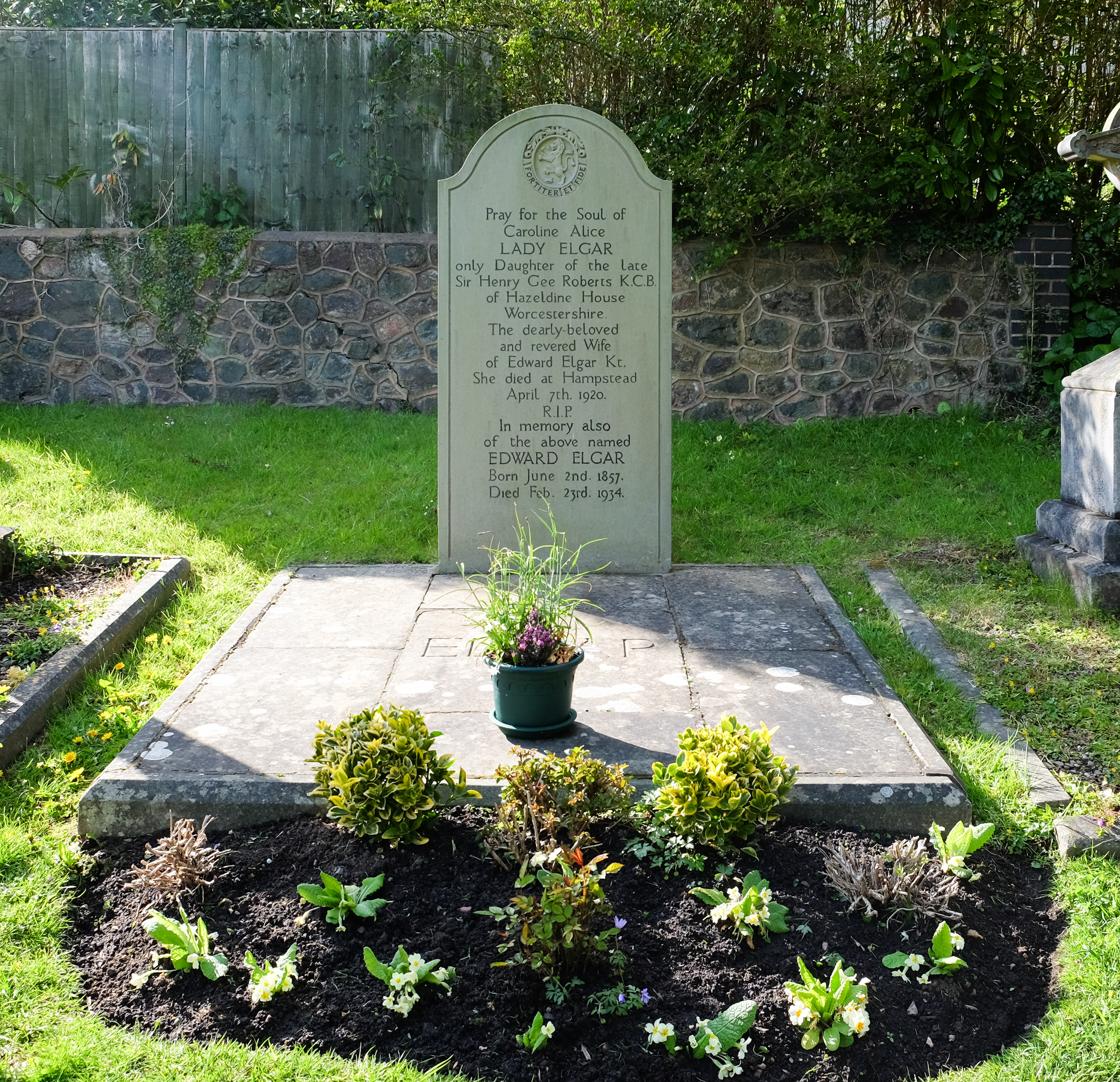
Grave of Edward Elgar and his wife Alice

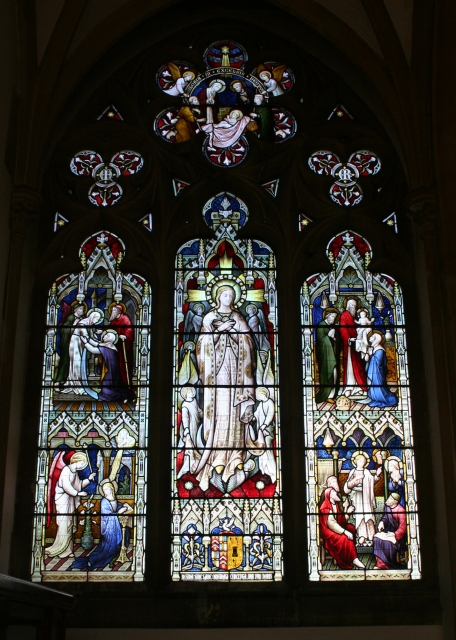
Stained glass window

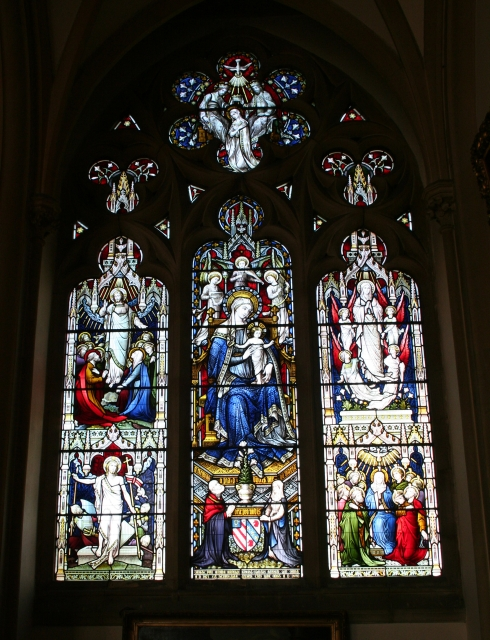
Stained glass window

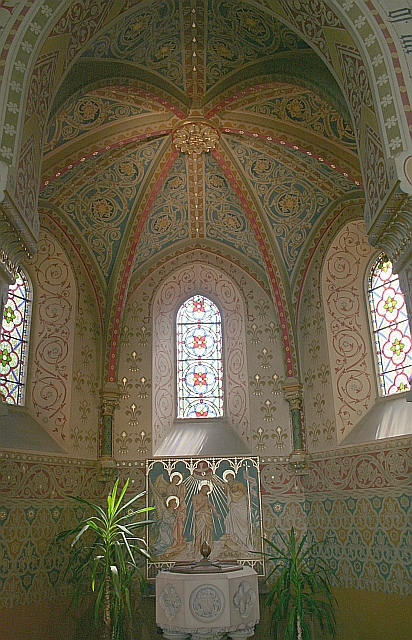
Baptistry

== Sources ==
- Brooks, Alan; Pevsner, Nikolaus (2007). Worcestershire. The Buildings of England. New Haven, US and London: Yale University Press. ISBN 978-0-300-11298-6. OCLC 237891290.
