= Eric Lucey =

British scientific film pioneer

- Born: 10 March 1923; Broadheath, Worcestershire
- Died: 26 August 2010 (aged 87); Edinburgh
- Education: University of Edinburgh
- Occupation: Scientific film-maker

Eric Lucey (10 March 1923 – 26 August 2010) was a British scientific film pioneer, best known for his film showing a flea's jump.

== Early life ==
Lucey was born in Broadheath, Worcestershire. His father was a clergyman and as a teenager, he attended a small boarding school for the sons of clergy near Cheltenham. He was encouraged to conduct his own experiments at the school's physics and chemistry laboratories. He had an interest in craftwork and photography, skills he utilised when he was in charge of the West African Photographic Liaison Service, while on war service in India. He spent a year in Cornwall after being demobilised, before heading to Edinburgh to study science.

== Education ==
Lucey studied science at the University of Edinburgh. During his studies he was involved in student politics, charities and other social activities. He assisted in organising the first torchlight procession from Edinburgh Castle to Calton Hill where he met Elspeth, his future wife.

== Career ==
In the 1950s, after graduating from the University, he met Conrad Hal Waddington, director of the Institute of Animal Genetics and was offered the opportunity to initiate a Research Film Unit at the institute. One of the key characteristics of Lucey's work was his manipulation of speed, motion and scale using various techniques, most notably, time-lapse and microphotography.

=== Notable works ===
- Jump of the Flea
- Time Lapse of Sky, Flowers, Princes Street and Lothian Road
- Mimosa Pudica unfurling
- Shoreline Sediments (won first prize in the Geography/Geology section at the 5th International Festival of Science and Technical Films in 1970)

== Death ==
Lucey died in Edinburgh on 26 August 2010.
