= Elgar Birthplace Museum =

Composer's birthplace in England

Elgar's Birthplace
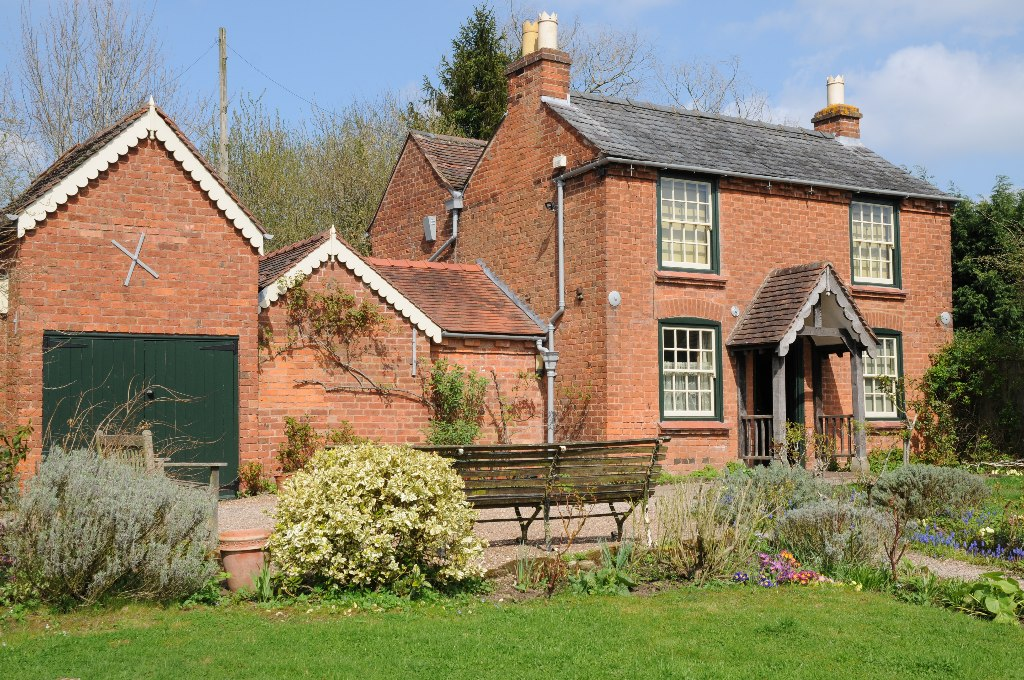
- The birthplace cottage
- Established: 1934
- Location: Lower Broadheath, Worcestershire, WR2 6RH, England, United Kingdom
- Coordinates: 52.20°N 2.28°W
- Website: www.nationaltrust.org.uk/the-firs

The Firs in Lower Broadheath, Worcestershire, England was the birthplace of Edward Elgar. The cottage now houses a museum administered by the National Trust. Edward Elgar was born at the house on 2 June 1857, and lived there for the first two years of his life. The museum comprises the Birthplace Cottage and its garden, and the modern Elgar Centre, opened in 2000, which houses further exhibitions and a function room.

== History and collection ==
William Henry Elgar moved to Worcestershire from Kent in the 1840s, to further his business as a piano tuner. He married Anne Greening, a farmer's daughter from the Forest of Dean. Edward William Elgar, the fourth of their seven children, was born at The Firs on 2 June 1857, and lived here until his family moved to Worcester two years later. The cottage was established as a museum in 1934, on Elgar's death, by his daughter Carice Elgar Blake. (Note: Elgar, and his wife, Alice, are buried in the nearby Church of St Wulstan at Little Malvern.)

The museum houses a broad collection of Elgar memorabilia, including original music manuscripts; letters from and to Elgar, his friends and family; proofs, programmes and other items connected with Elgar's music; family photographs and scrapbooks; items connected with his travels and with his hobbies including golf and cycling; personal possessions, awards and honours, and film of his later years.

Low visitor numbers and significant annual operating losses saw the National Trust take over the administration of the museum in 2016. The Trust's administration is supported by the Elgar Society. It has Accredited Museum status from the Arts Council England.

In 2018, the majority of the Elgar manuscript archive was moved from The Firs to the British Library, despite local opposition.

== Architecture, events and facilities ==
The Firs is a Grade II listed building. It comprises the cottage, the Elgar Centre built in 2000 and an adjacent function room. The cottage is constructed of brick and is of two storeys. The coach house and stables were built by Elgar's father, William Elgar, and his uncle, Henry.

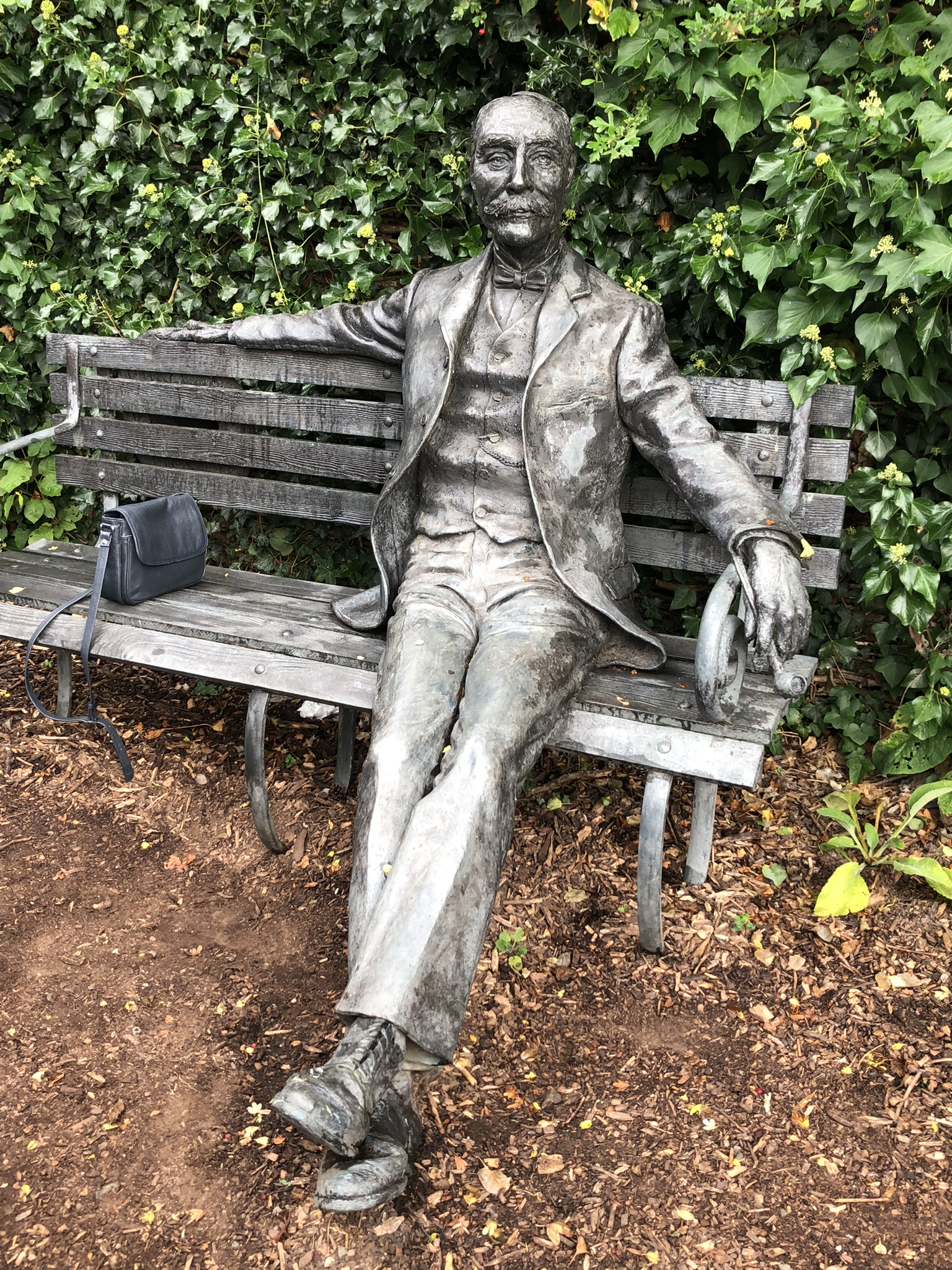
Elgar sculpture Broadheath Museum

The museum offers a programme of events throughout the year and annual visitor numbers have risen from around 10,000 to just under 30,000.

== See also ==
- List of music museums

== Sources ==
- Brooks, Alan; Pevsner, Nikolaus (2007). Worcestershire. The Buildings of England. New Haven, US and London: Yale University Press. ISBN 978-0-300-11298-6. OCLC 237891290.
