= Sherrard's Green =

Village in Worcestershire, England

Coordinates: 52.1153°N 2.3010°W

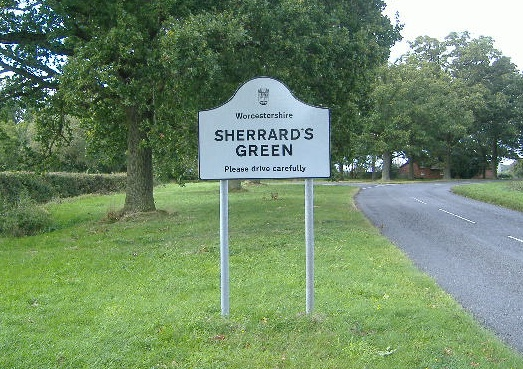

- Location within Worcestershire
  - London: 103 miles (166 km)
- Civil parish: Malvern
- District: Malvern Hills
- Shire county: Worcestershire
- Region: West Midlands
- Country: England
- Sovereign state: United Kingdom
- Post town: MALVERN
- Postcode district: WR14
- Dialling code: 01684
- Police: West Mercia
- Fire: Hereford and Worcester
- Ambulance: West Midlands
- UK Parliament: West Worcestershire

Sherrard's Green is a village and a suburb of Malvern, Worcestershire, England, situated approximately 1.5 miles (2.4 km) southeast of Great Malvern, the town's centre, and about 0.5 miles (0.80 km) from the Malvern suburb of Barnards Green. The village comprises a number of council and private housing estates and the small parish church of St Mary's, Pickersleigh, and a Tesco convenience store that opened in 2011 on the site of a former pub, The New Gas Tavern.

== Transport ==
=== Rail ===
Services are provided from Great Malvern railway station located in Avenue Road, Malvern, about 1.0 mile (1.6 km) away with direct services to Worcester, Hereford, Birmingham, Oxford and London.

=== Bus ===
Two local bus services connect Sherrard's Green with the surrounding area including the 42/S42 operated by LMS Travel stopping along Madresfield Road and serving the Elgar Avenue Estate. Serving areas further afield is the Malvern to Worcester route 44 operated by First Worcestershire serving stops from Barnards Green to Prospect View via Pound Bank Road and Madresfield Road.

=== Air ===
The nearest major airport is Birmingham approximately one hour by road via the M5 and M42 motorways. Gloucestershire Airport located at Staverton, in the Borough of Tewkesbury near Malvern is a busy General Aviation airport used mainly for private charter and scheduled flights to destinations such as the islands of Jersey, Guernsey, and the Isle of Man, pilot training, and by the aircraft of emergency services.
