= Leah Broad =

British writer, broadcaster, academic

Leah Broad FRHistS
- Education: University of Oxford
- Occupations: Author; Radio and television presenter; Researcher
- Writing career
- Subjects: Music history, Women's history
- Website: leahbroad.com

Leah Broad is a British writer, broadcaster, and researcher at Christ Church, Oxford. She was awarded the 2015 Observer/Anthony Burgess prize for contemporary British arts journalism and was a BBC New Generation Thinker in 2016 She is a trustee of the William Alwyn Foundation. Her writing focuses on the history of women in the arts. Her group biography, Quartet, published by Faber and Faber, won the Royal Philharmonic Society's Storytelling Prize, won the Presto Music Book of the Year award, was shortlisted for the Slightly Foxed Best First Biography prize, and was awarded a Kirkus star.

== Early life and education ==
Broad completed an undergraduate degree in Music at Christ Church, Oxford, where she ran the Christ Church Music Society and founded and edited the Oxford Culture Review. She holds a doctorate in musicology from the University of Oxford on Swedish and Finnish theatre music.

== Writing and presenting ==
Broad's debut group biography, Quartet, covers the lives of women composers Ethel Smyth, Rebecca Clarke, Doreen Carwithen, and Dorothy Howell. The book argues that women have had important influences on classical composition, but that this progress is not linear and can be erased and forgotten. Broad has discussed the book at festivals including the Hay Festival and Edinburgh International Book Festival. Alongside violinist Fenella Humphreys and pianist Nicola Eimer, Broad presented performances of works by the composers covered in the book at venues including the Barbican Centre. She has a second book under contract with Faber and Faber.

Broad has presented for BBC Radio 3 including appearances on Record Review, Composer of the Week, Music Matters, the Sunday Feature, and the BBC Proms. Broad's journalistic work covering music and the arts has featured in newspapers including The Guardian, the Financial Times, and the London Review of Books. Broad's academic work has been published in the Journal of the Royal Musical Association, Music & Letters, Tempo, and Music and the Moving Image as well as collected volumes from the Oxford University Press, Cambridge University Press, Routledge, and Boydell and Brewer.
