= Upper Broadheath =

Area of Lower Broadheath, Worcestershire, England

Coordinates: 52.20056°N 2.285509°W

- Location within Worcestershire
- OS grid reference: SO805558
- Civil parish: Lower Broadheath
- District: Malvern Hills
- Shire county: Worcestershire
- Region: West Midlands
- Country: England
- Sovereign state: United Kingdom
- Post town: WORCESTER
- Postcode district: WR2
- Police: West Mercia
- Fire: Hereford and Worcester
- Ambulance: West Midlands

Upper Broadheath is an area in the village of Lower Broadheath. It is not a separate village. Worcestershire, England. It is in the Malvern Hills District and the civil parish of Lower Broadheath.
