= Nicholson & Co Ltd =

English pipe organ manufacturer

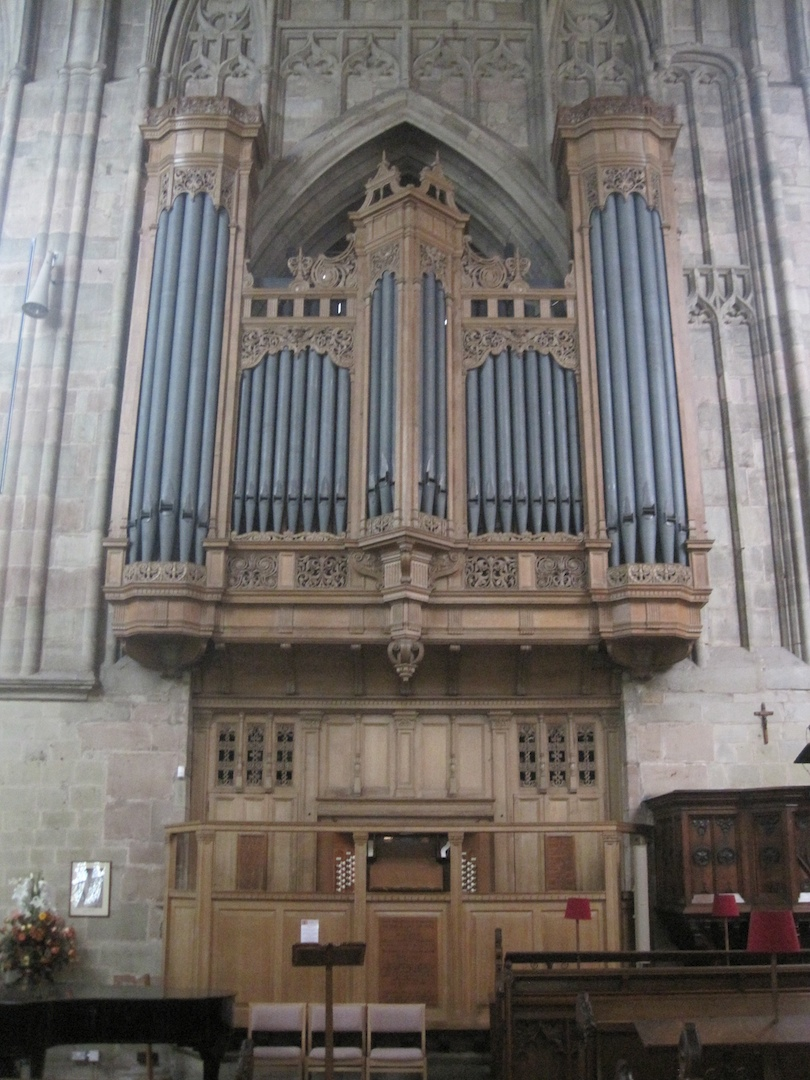
Malvern Priory organ case

Nicholson & Co. Ltd manufactures pipe organs. It was founded in 1841 by John Nicholson. Its work encompasses the creation of new instruments as well as historical restorations, rebuilds and renovations. In 2013, the firm completed the first wholly new instrument in a British cathedral since 1962 at Llandaff Cathedral in Cardiff.

== History ==
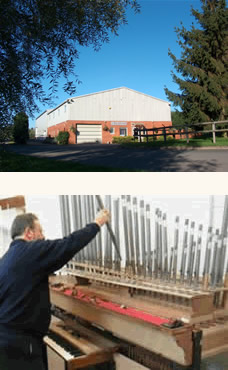
Nicholson factory in Malvern

The Nicholsons were a family of organ builders originating from Rochdale, Lancashire, in the North of England. John Nicholson moved to Worcester in 1840 and soon afterwards he moved his workshop to Palace Yard, close to the cathedral. John Nicholson's work included organs in Malvern Priory, Worcester Shire Hall and Gloucester Shire Hall. In 1861, the firm installed a large instrument in Manchester Cathedral, and in the second half of the nineteenth century, was in demand to supply organs to hundreds of parish churches across England and Scotland. Some instruments were ordered from overseas, with Nicholson organs being shipped to China, Australia and New Zealand. John Nicholson's successor in the business was Arthur Whinfield, who introduced several innovations such as patent key-touches and pneumatic action. By increasing the air pressure, he was able to augment the voicing, and completed projects at the Birmingham Oratory and Leominster Priory.

In 1935, Stanley Lambert took over and patented an electro-pneumatic action. Many of these instruments are still in use without the need for restoration. In 1956 the company relocated to its Quest Hills Road factory in Malvern and later to Lower Interfields near Malvern in a rural location at the foot of the Malvern Hills. Major projects in the last few decades include Portsmouth Cathedral, Southwell Minster, Llandaff Cathedral, Dean Close School, Cheltenham, and Holy Trinity Cathedral, Auckland.
