= Rebecca Miller (conductor) =

American conductor

- Born: Palo Alto, California, United States
- Occupation: Conductor
- Parent: Leta Miller

Rebecca Miller (born 1975) is an American conductor.

Miller was born in Palo Alto, California; her mother is flutist and musicologist Leta Miller. She graduated from Oberlin Conservatory with a piano degree, then studied conducting at Northwestern University and the Royal College of Music, where she was a Paul Woodhouse Junior Fellow in Conducting.

Miller founded the New Professionals Orchestra in London in 1999. After winning first prize in the fourth Eduardo Mata Conducting Competition, she was a conducting fellow of the Houston Symphony from 2005-2007. From 2007-2010, she was Resident Conductor of the Louisiana Philharmonic Orchestra. She is currently music director of the Royal Tunbridge Wells Choral Society and Orchestra, Director of Orchestras at the Royal Holloway University of London, and associate conductor of the Southbank Sinfonia.

Miller's discography includes a disc of symphonies by Carl Philipp Emanuel Bach with the Orchestra of the Age of Enlightenment, on the Signum label, that was an Editor's Choice in the May 2015 edition of Gramophone magazine; a recording for Mode records of "String Music of Lou Harrison" which was used for the score of the film Shutter Island; the world-premiere recording of Goblin Market by Aaron Jay Kernis for Signum Records, which was chosen as a Recording of the Year in 2011 by MusicWeb International; and a recording of music of Henry Hadley with the BBC Concert Orchestra on Dutton Vocalion.

Miller is married to the British pianist Danny Driver. The couple has a daughter and a son.
