= Troyte Griffith =

British architect (1864–1942)

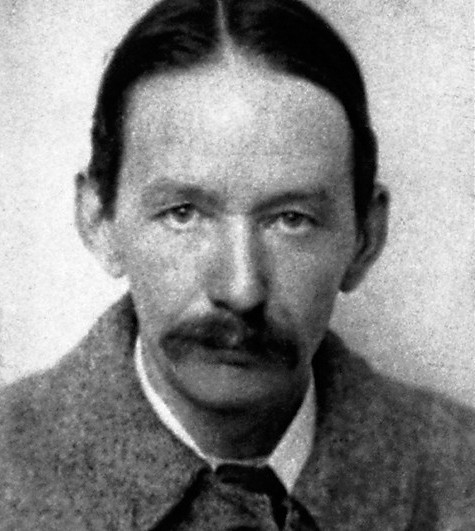
- Griffith, circa 1900
- Born: Arthur Troyte Griffith; June 19, 1864; Headington, Oxfordshire, United Kingdom
- Died: January 17, 1942 (aged 77); Malvern, Worcestershire, United Kingdom
- Occupation: Architect
- Notable work: Worcestershire Beacon Toposcope, All Saints Church

Arthur Troyte Griffith (19 June 1864 – 17 January 1942) was a British architect and artist. He is known for his architectural work in Malvern on buildings such as the All Saints Church and the Worcestershire Beacon Toposcope and his immortalization in Variation VII of the Enigma Variations, "Troyte," by his friend, Edward Elgar.

Griffith was an architect at the firm Nevinson & Newton, and was also the first secretary and the treasurer of the Malvern Concert Club, which he had helped Elgar found.

== Biography ==
=== Early life and education (1864–1897) ===
The eldest of 11 children, Griffith was born in Headington, Oxfordshire, England, on June 19, 1864 to Harriet Dyke Acland Troyte and George Griffith.

He studied at the Harrow School from September 1877 to Summer 1883. Later, on October 27th, 1883, he enrolled in Oriel College, in Oxford, where he studied architecture and received his BA in 1887. After graduating, he studied architecture and painting abroad in Spain he went to work at an architects' offices in London for some initial work experience, before moving to Malvern in 1896. In 1897, the RIBA awarded him the Aldenwinkle Studentship.

=== Career (1896–1942) ===
In Malvern, 1896, Griffith was employed by the architectural firm Nevinson & Newton at the Abbey Hotel. There he designed structures such as the All Saints Church, in Malvern Wells and the Wyche Institute. In 1904 he took a scholarship to study French and Spanish architecture. In 1908, the firm ceased its operations leading Griffith to take over its offices. He would work there until 1935, when he moved his office to Prior's Croft; he would remain there until his death. During his career, he design the Toposcope at the Worcestershire Beacon, in 1899, and a number of local houses.

In October 1903, with his friend, Edward Elgar, Griffith helped found the Malvern Concert Club. He became its first secretary and treasurer, and held those position for 38 years until his death.

=== Personal life and death ===
Griffith was a founding member of the Malvern Chess Club, in which he was elected secretary and treasurer in its inaugural meeting on February 28th, 1899. In 1931, he was elected the club's president after the death of member Hugh Bennett, and in 1938 and 1939, Griffith won the Malvern Chess Club Championship. He would occasionally represent Worcestershire in chess tournaments until his death in 1942.

After a short illness attributed to heart failure, Griffith died on January 17th, 1942, aged 77. His funeral was held 4 days later, on January 21st, at All Saints Church. He was buried in Malvern Well Municipal Cemetery.

== Enigma Variations ==
Elgar's The Enigma Variation, Variation VII(Presto), "Troyte"
Performed by the Hallé Orchestra, conducted by Sir John Barbirolli

Griffith was a close friend of the English composer Edward Elgar and was immortalized in Variation VII of Elgar's Enigma Variation titled "Troyte". The variation is written in the unusual time signature of 1/1 and at the tempo Presto, mimicking his incompetent enthusiasm whilst Elgar attempted to teach him some piano. In the end, the piano lid slammed onto the keyboard, ending the variation. The following variation, VIII (Allegretto) "W.N", refers to the time Winifred and Florence Norbury sheltered Elgar and Griffith in their eighteenth century home (Sherridge, Leigh Sinton, near Malvern), during a thunderstorm.

== Legacy ==
While Griffith is mostly known for his friendship with Edward Elgar and the variation in the Enigma Variations dedicated to him, in 2018, the Malvern Civil Society unveiled a blue plaque at Griffith's former home Fair View, Lower Wyche Road, in Malvern Wells in honor of him and his architectural work for the community.

In 2012, the microbiologist, Jeremy Hardie, wrote the book, Troyte Griffith: Malvern Architect and Elgar's Friend, which discusses Griffith's life.

== Works ==
=== Buildings ===
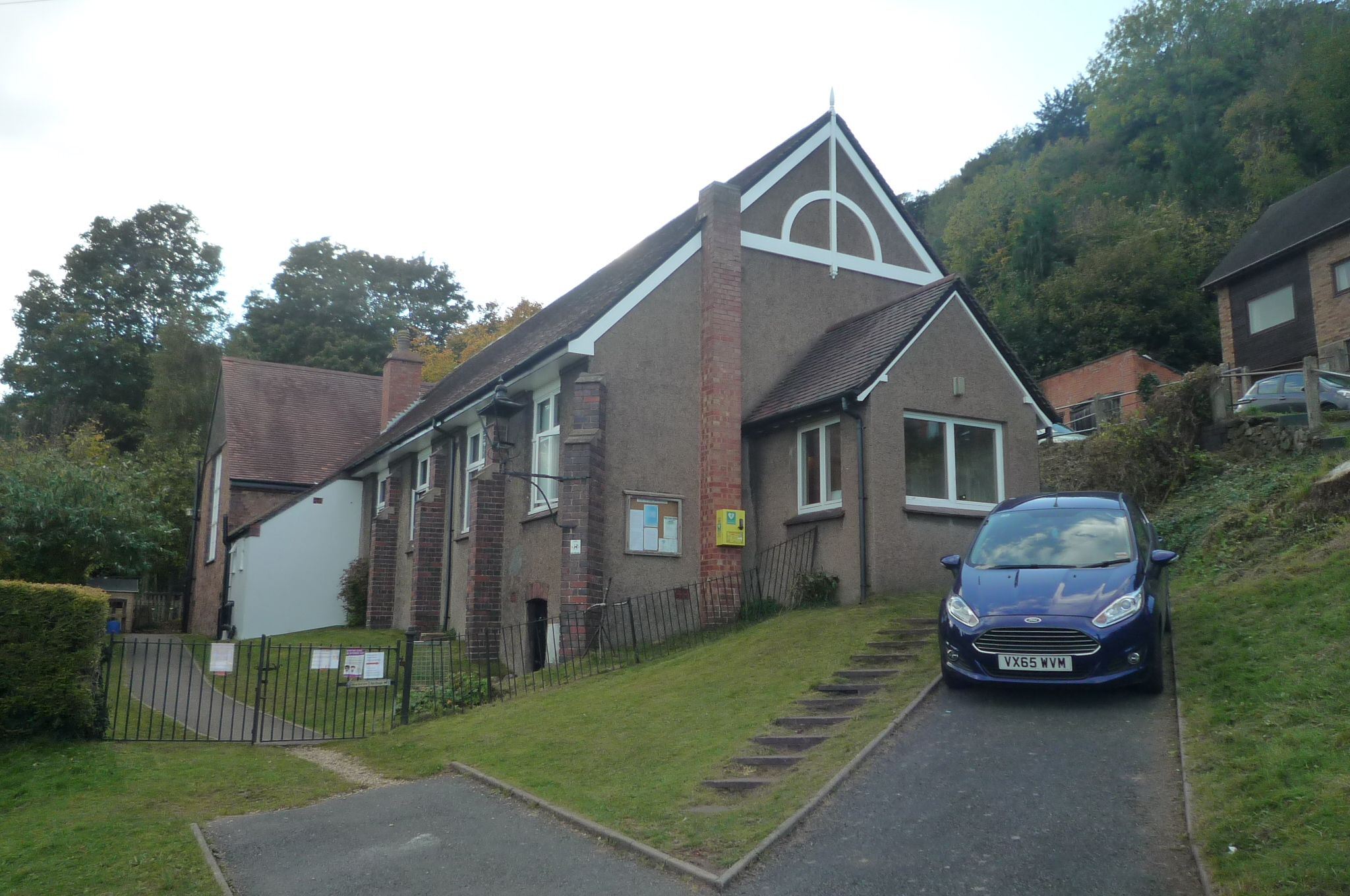
Wyche Institute

- All Saints Church, Malvern Wells
- Toposcope at the Worcestershire Beacon
- Wyche Institute
- Mulberry House

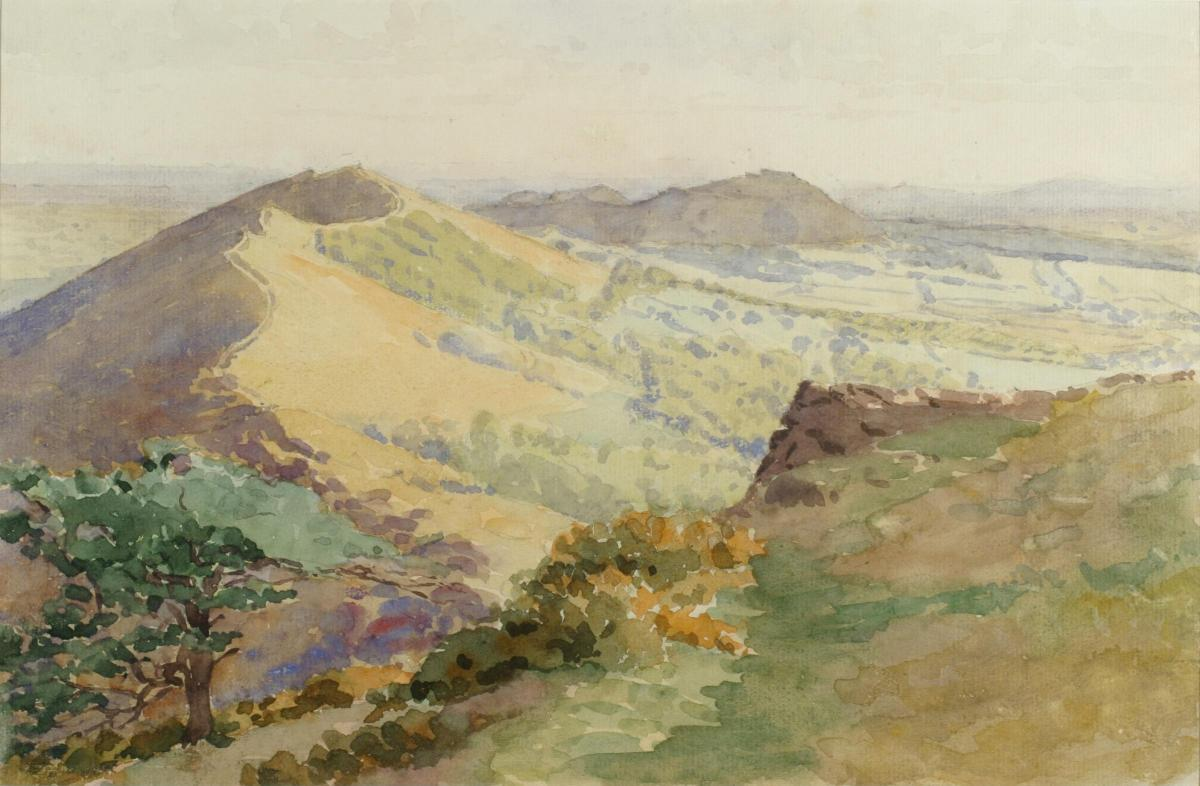
British Camp by Arthur Troyte Griffith

=== Paintings ===
- White Sands Bay Saint Davids
- Honfleur St. Catherines Church
- British Camp
- Priory stained glass
- Port Gaverne Cornwall 1928
- Abbey Archway
- Malvern Priory
- The Valley of Teme
- Fareham Mill
- Malvern Hills
- Watercolour of Coutances Cathedral in northern France
- Malvern Priory Gateway
- The River Severn near Upton upon Severn
- Willows on the River Avon, Tiddington House Garden, Stratford-on-Avon
- Great Malvern Priory and Churchyard
- Worcester Cathedral

== See also ==
- Enigma Variations
- Edward Elgar

== Sources ==
Hardie, Jeremy (2012). Troyte Griffith: Malvern Architect and Elgar's Friend (1st ed.). Malvern, Worcestershire, United Kingdom: Aspect Design (published January 1, 2012). ISBN 978-1908832108.
