= Little Malvern Priory =

Grade I listed historic house museum in Malvern Hills, United Kingdom

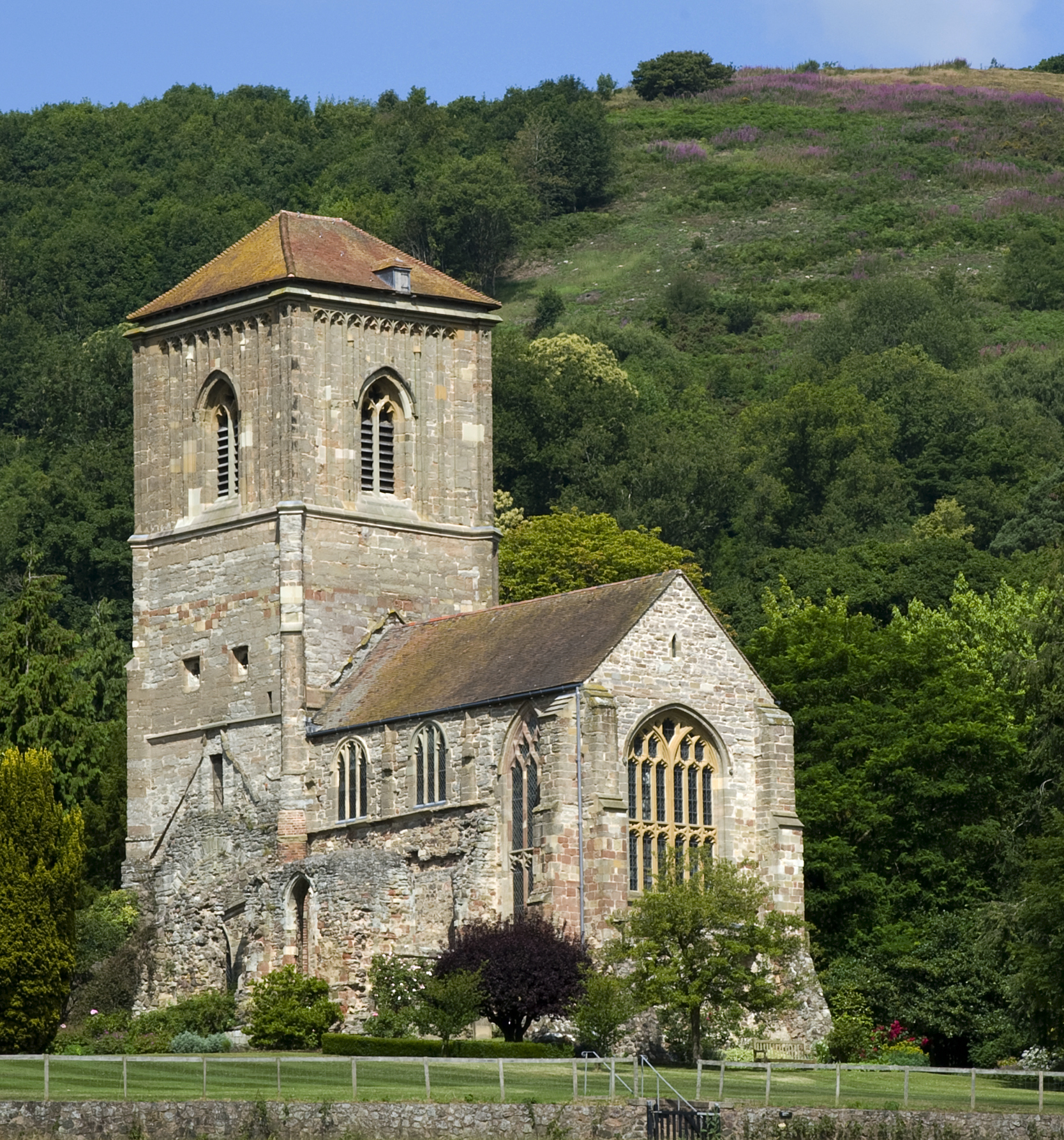
Little Malvern Priory Church.

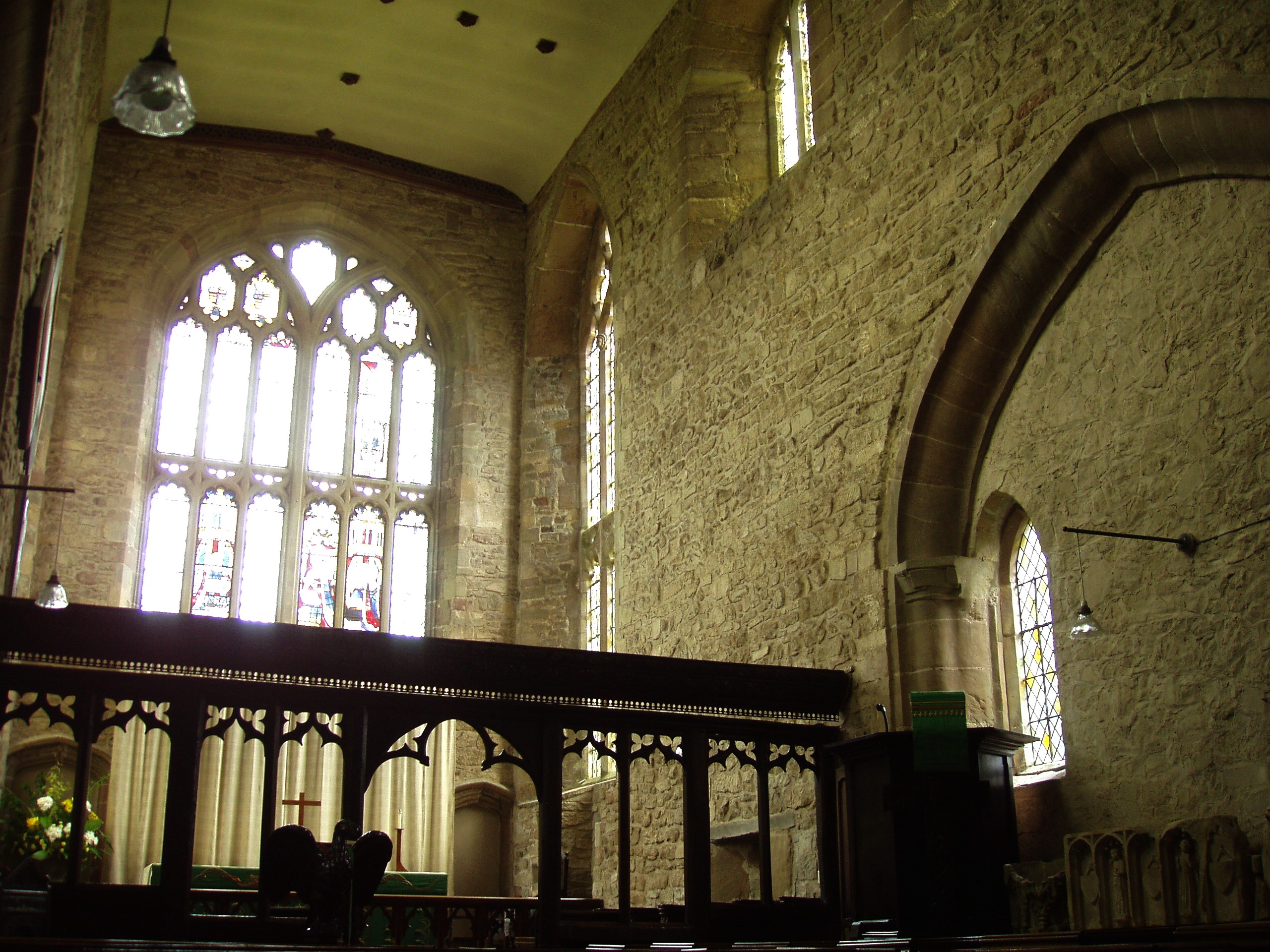
Interior details.

Little Malvern Priory, in the village of Little Malvern near Malvern, Worcestershire, was a Benedictine monastery c. 1171–1537. It was founded from Worcester Cathedral. Little remains of the 12th-century church, which was rebuilt in 1480–1482. The site is now occupied by a house named Little Malvern Court, which has limited public opening. The present building comprises a medieval chancel and crossing tower, and a modern west porch on the site of the east bays of the nave. The transepts and the two chapels flanking the choir are in ruins. The grade I listed Little Malvern Priory church, dedicated to St Giles, is adjacent.

See Abbeys and priories in England for a complete list of English abbeys and priories. National Grid reference: SO770404.

== Royal window at Malvern Priory Church ==
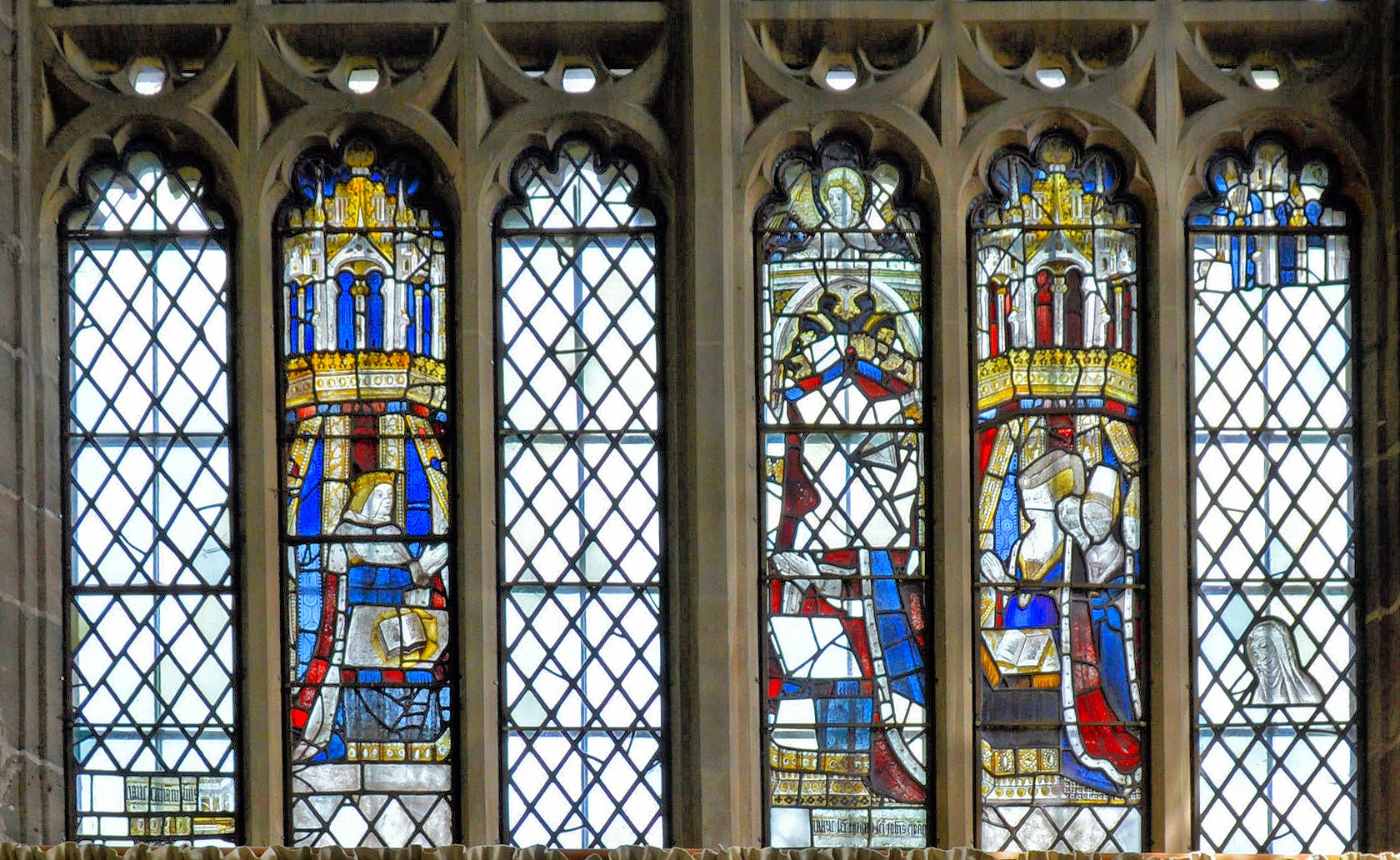
Little Malvern Priory - geograph.org.uk - 5783494

When the church was rebuilt in 1480-1482, a stained glass window depicting King Edward IV and his family was placed behind the altar in the most prominent position. It is of similar design to the York Royal Window at Canterbury Cathedral. Unfortunately, here most of the window has not survived. Originally the window would have likely depicted the entire royal family, in 6 panels.

The two princes were on the left, each in a separate window panel:

- Richard of Shrewsbury, Duke of York - currently missing.
- Edward, prince of Wales (the later Edward V) - still in place, believed to be one of a few surviving contemporary depictions.

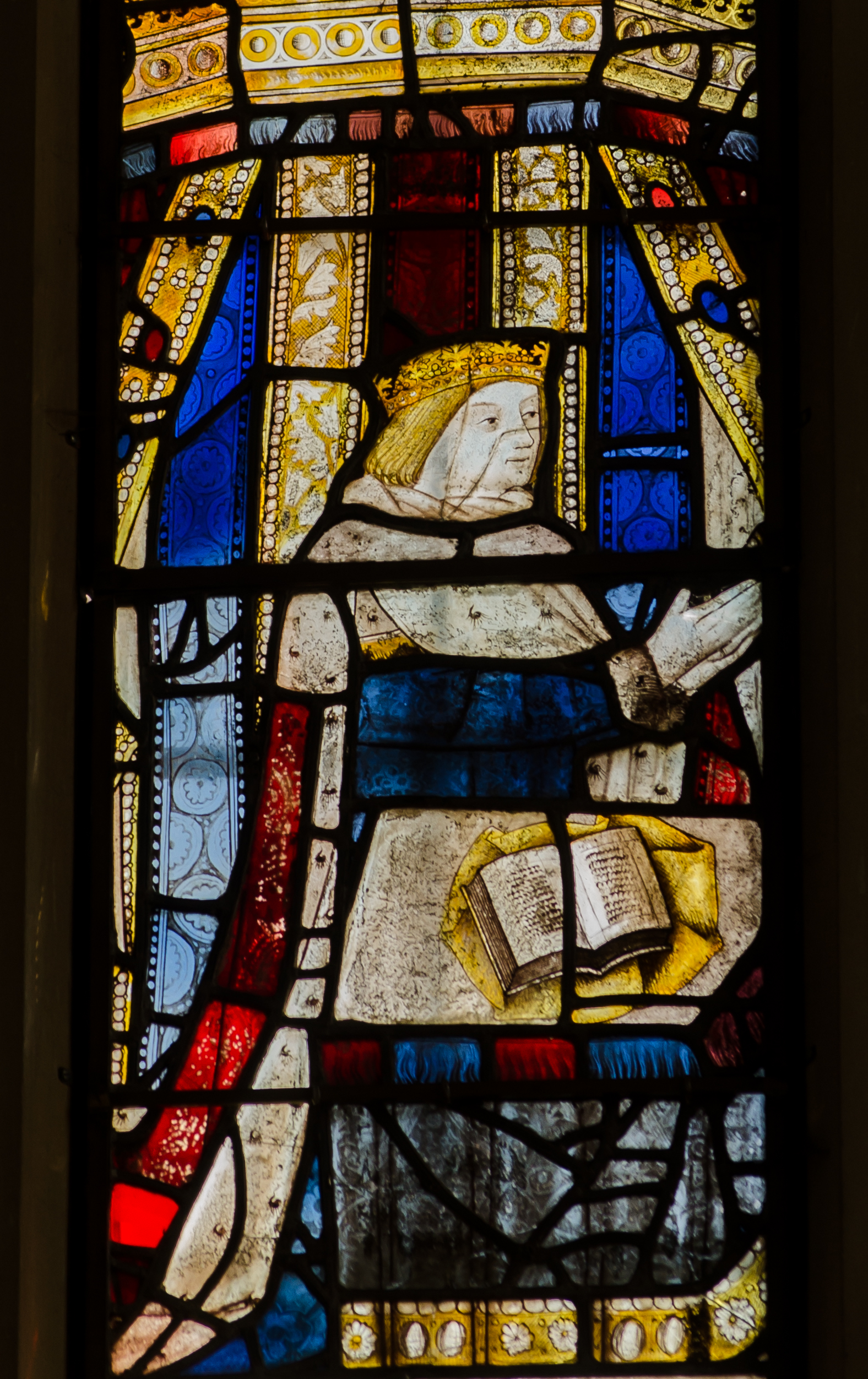
Edward Prince of Wales window, Little Malvern Priory - geograph.org.uk - 4144924

Then the royal couple in the middle :

- King Edward IV - currently missing.
- Queen Elizabeth Woodville - her head, headwear, and part of her torso are all missing.

And finally all the York Princesses in two panels to the right of their parents:

- Elizabeth of York - still in place.
- Mary of York - still in place.
- Cecily of York - currently unknown.
- Anne of York - currently unknown.
- Catherine of York - currently unknown.
- Bridget of York - currently unknown; possibly not yet born

Only one of two panels is still at place and heads of two younger girls were added to the panel of their older sisters (thus making it impossible to say who they are). Originally they would have been in the second panel.

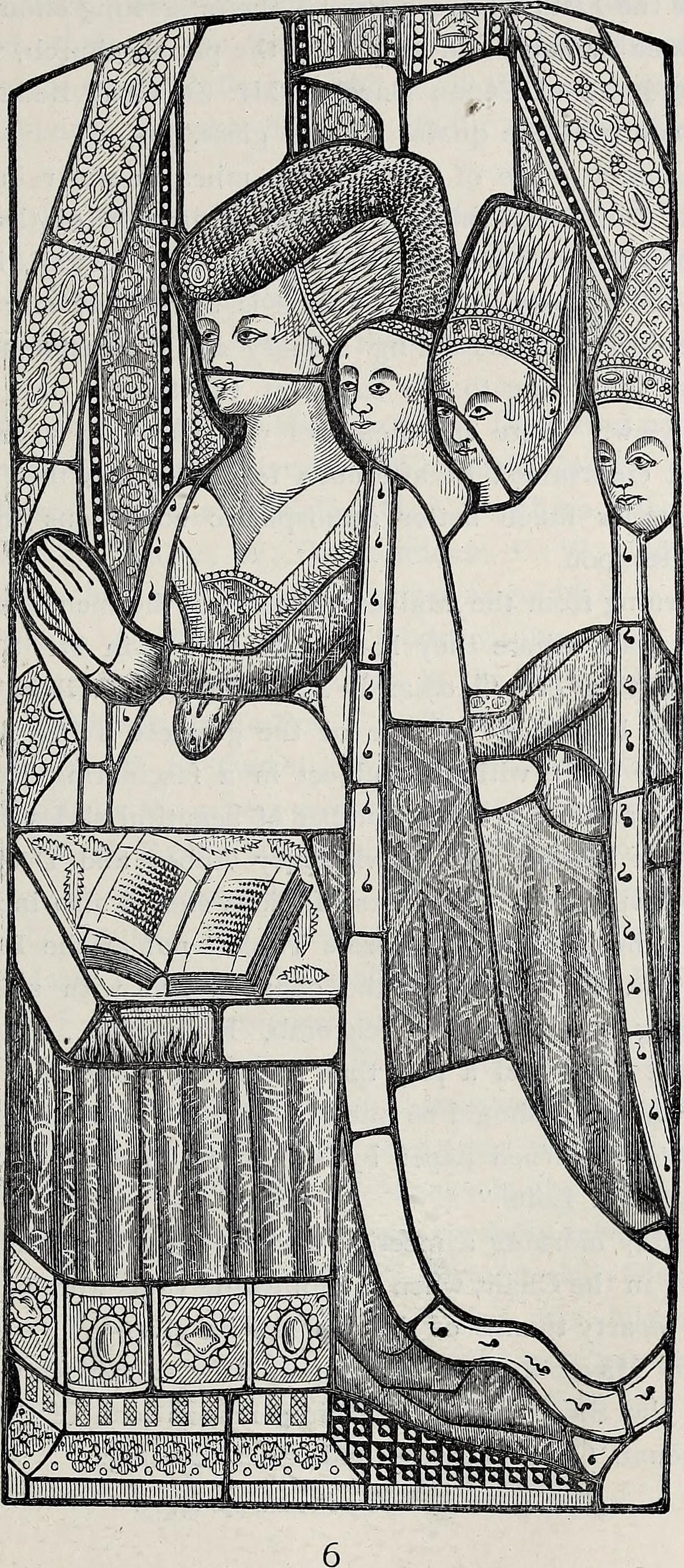
Transactions of the Bristol and Gloucestershire Archaeological Society (1902) (14760260126)

== See also ==
- List of English abbeys, priories and friaries serving as parish churches
- Places of worship in Malvern, Worcestershire
