= Danny Driver =

British pianist (born 1977)

Danny Driver (born 1977) is a British classical pianist.

== Career ==
He was born and grew up in London. His mother is Israeli, and his first language was Hebrew. His father was a keen amateur violinist who studied at Oxford University. Through his mother, he is descended from the Baal Shem Tov (also an ancestor of his wife, the American conductor Rebecca Miller). He studied Natural Sciences at the University of Cambridge before moving to the Royal College of Music. In 2001 he won both the Royal Over-Seas League Competition Keyboard Award and the BBC Radio 2 Young Musician of the Year Competition.

Danny has performed with the BBC Scottish Symphony Orchestra, Royal Philharmonic Orchestra, Orchestra of the Age of Enlightenment, Minnesota Orchestra, and Bournemouth Symphony Orchestra, among many others. He has made two appearances at the BBC Proms, most recently with the Royal Philharmonic Orchestra and their Artistic Director Charles Dutoit. His performance of Saint-Saëns' 'Egyptian' Concerto at the 2012 Bard Music Festival was released by the American Symphony Orchestra on its own ASO live label.

Driver's recordings for the Hyperion Records label include music by Robert Schumann, C. P. E. Bach, George Frideric Handel, Mily Balakirev, as well as neglected British composers such as Benjamin Dale, York Bowen, and Erik Chisholm. He has also recorded all of the Beethoven violin sonatas with British violinist Chloe Hanslip. His recording of York Bowen's complete Piano Sonatas was nominated for a Gramophone Award in 2010; his recording of Handel's Eight Great Suites was voted Instrumental Recording of the Year 2014 by Australia's Limelight magazine.

In 2016, Driver was appointed Professor of Piano at the Royal College of Music, London.

The couple has a daughter and a son.
