= Lower Broadheath =

Village in Worcestershire, England

Coordinates: 52.209171°N 2.273226°W

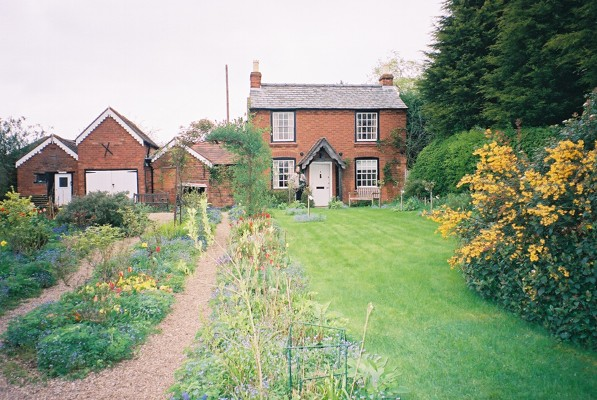
- Edward Elgar's birthplace in Broadheath

- Location within Worcestershire
- Population: 1,728 (2011 Census)
- OS grid reference: SO8156
- Civil parish: Lower Broadheath
- District: Malvern Hills
- Shire county: Worcestershire
- Region: West Midlands
- Country: England
- Sovereign state: United Kingdom
- Post town: WORCESTER
- Postcode district: WR2
- Dialling code: 01905
- Police: West Mercia
- Fire: Hereford and Worcester
- Ambulance: West Midlands
- UK Parliament: West Worcestershire

Lower Broadheath is a village and civil parish in the Malvern Hills district of Worcestershire, England. According to the 2011 census it had a population of 1,728, slightly increased from the 1,713 recorded in 2001. The parish also includes Upper Broadheath.

The village is about 3 miles north-west of Worcester.

== History ==
In 1848, the village population was 482 people. The village was originally in the parish of Hallow, until Christchurch church was consecrated in 1904. There was a chapel of ease or secondary Anglican church dating from 1836, and an independent chapel belonging to Lady Huntingdon's connection, dating from 1825. The church bell is thought to be 500 years old.

Broadheath is the birthplace of the English composer Edward Elgar. The cottage in which he was born is now the Elgar Birthplace Museum.

== Amenities ==
There are many housing estates in the village, including the Jacomb estate (Jacomb Road, Jacomb Drive, Jacomb Close and Rectory Close).

The village has a village hall, church, post office and shop, a village green (containing a football pitch, running track and many children's play areas) and a large village common. There is also a primary school (Broadheath C.E. Primary School). The school, which dates from the 19th century, serves around 150 children, from the age of four up to eleven. There are also two pubs in the village.

== Local government ==
Lower Broadheath has a Parish Council which meets monthly at the Village Hall. Lower Broadheath ward on Malvern Hills District Council is represented by Cllr Daniel Walton (Independent), who was elected in 2019 and re-elected in 2023. It is in the Hallow division of Worcestershire County Council, represented by Cllr Mel Fordington (Conservative).

== Notable people ==
- Edward Elgar (1957-1934), composer
- Tommy Harfield (born 2009), racing driver
