= Little Malvern =

Village in Worcestershire, England

Coordinates: 52.06178°N 2.33713°W

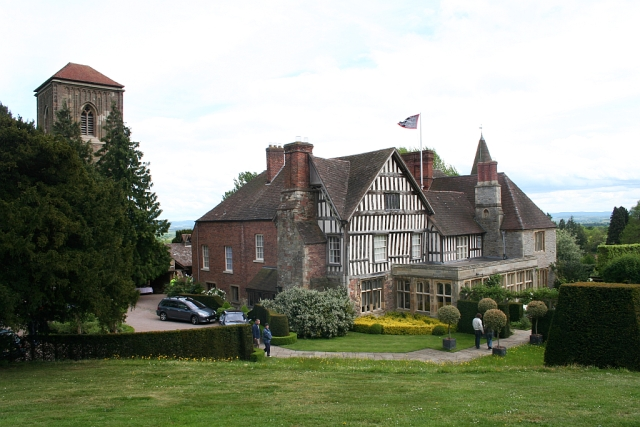
- Little Malvern Court

- Location within Worcestershire
- OS grid reference: SO770403
- Civil parish: Little Malvern
- District: Malvern Hills
- Shire county: Worcestershire
- Region: West Midlands
- Country: England
- Sovereign state: United Kingdom
- Post town: MALVERN
- Postcode district: WR14
- Dialling code: 01684
- Police: West Mercia
- Fire: Hereford and Worcester
- Ambulance: West Midlands
- UK Parliament: West Worcestershire

Little Malvern is a small village and civil parish in Worcestershire, England. It is situated on the lower slopes of the Malvern Hills, south of Malvern Wells, near Great Malvern, the major centre of the area often referred to as The Malverns. Little Malvern shares a parish council with Welland, with 2 of the 11 councillors.

== Etymology ==
The name Malvern is first attested in a charter of around 1030, as Mælfern, and then in the Domesday Book of 1086 as Malferna. The name derives from the Common Brittonic words that survive in modern Welsh as moel ("bare") and bryn ("hill"); thus it once meant "bare hill". The name perhaps applied originally to the hill now called Worcester Beacon, after which Great Malvern and Little Malvern were then named. Additions corresponding to the Little part of Little Malvern, made to distinguish the settlement from Great Malvern, are first attested in 1232 and 1275, using the Latin words parve and minor and the French word petite.

== History and features ==
The village contains a Romanesque church called Little Malvern Priory, after a Benedictine monastery that existed on the site c.1171-1537. Next to the church is the historic house, Little Malvern Court, home to the Berington family for over four centuries. The gardens of Little Malvern court are occasionally open to the public.

According to a book published in 1848, an important find of brass Roman coins was unexpectedly made in 1847 in Little Malvern by a Mr Commissioner Mayne and his sons who were out walking in search of geological items of interest.

== Transport ==
The nearest railway station is Colwall, however Great Malvern is more typically more direct to reach; both are on the same line.

== Notable people ==
Rear Admiral Basil Place VC, recipient of the Victoria Cross, was born in Little Malvern.

The composer Edward Elgar and his wife Alice are buried at St Wulstan's Roman Catholic Church, and singer Jenny Lind lived at Wynd's Point, behind the priory, during her final years.
