= Stretton-on-Fosse =

Village in Warwickshire, England

Coordinates: 52.043°N 1.677°W

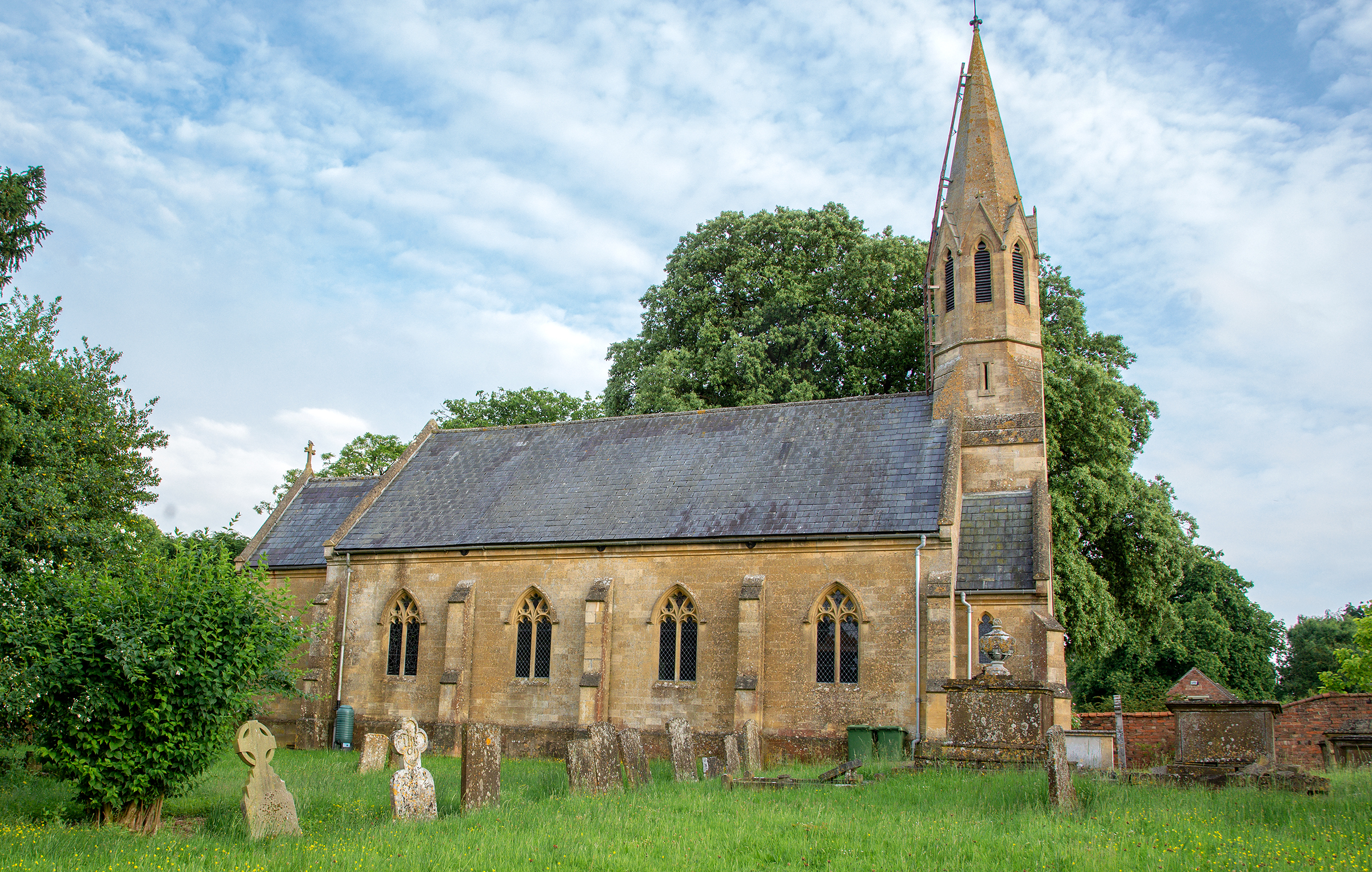
- St Peter's Church, Stretton-on-Fosse

- Location within Warwickshire
- Population: 439 (ward, 2011)
- OS grid reference: SP222384
- District: Stratford-on-Avon
- Shire county: Warwickshire
- Region: West Midlands
- Country: England
- Sovereign state: United Kingdom
- Post town: MORETON-IN-MARSH
- Postcode district: GL56
- Dialling code: 01789
- Police: Warwickshire
- Fire: Warwickshire
- Ambulance: West Midlands
- UK Parliament: Stratford-on-Avon

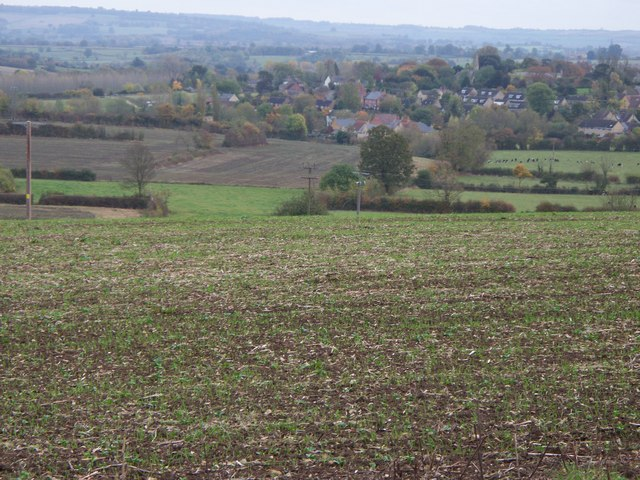
Skyline of Stretton-on-Fosse

Stretton-on-Fosse is a village in the Stratford-on-Avon District in Warwickshire, England. It is situated between the towns of Moreton-in-Marsh and Shipston-on-Stour. The village is situated along the ancient Fosse Way road which runs from Exeter in Devon to Lincoln in Lincolnshire. The road bypasses the village to the east and is now the modern-day A429 road. The village is close to the Gloucestershire and Warwickshire border. While the lower ground of the village is heavy clay the upper parts are composed of sand and shingle.

== History ==
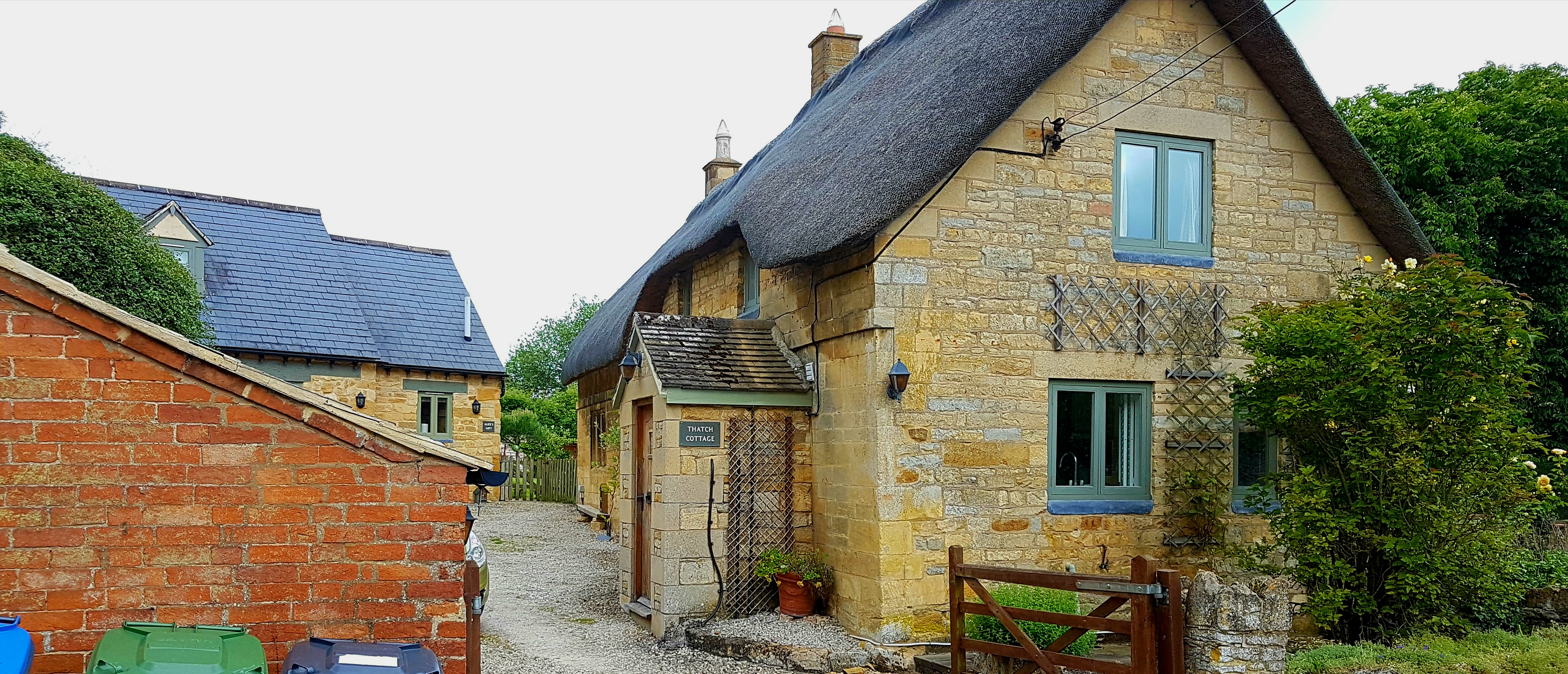
Some of the historic stone cottages feature thatched or slate roofs

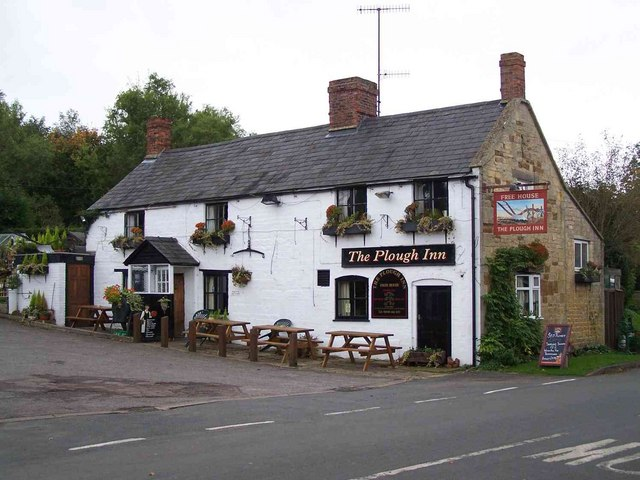
Exterior of the Plough Inn

Stretton means "settlement on a Roman road" (from the Old English stræt and tun). In this case the road is Fosse Way. During commercial extraction of sand important graves of the Roman-British and Anglo-Saxon periods were uncovered and interesting skeletons and personal belongings were unearthed. These burials were the result of internecine warfare between local tribal factions.

Two of the manors in Stratone, as Stretton-on-Fosse was then called, using its Saxon name are listed in the Domesday Book of 1086. Two significant manor houses still remain. The Manor House was built in 1886 and is a Grade II listed property. Stretton House, also Grade II listed, was built in the early 1600s but was substantially altered in the early 1800s. By comparison, the 1931 population was 282. The village has about 200 buildings, made of Cotswold stone or locally made red bricks. Of these, 18 are Grade II listed by Historic England. At one time, the village was known as Stretton upon Fosse.

== Amenities ==
Some of the current cottages were previously used for other purposes, such as Tea Cosy Cottage which was the village post office in the early 1900s and The Bakery cottage which retains its old bread oven. The village website indicates that until recently, the community consisted of several farms, with housing for local residents occupied in cultivation of the land and the trade association of the rural economy, such as, shops, Post office, school, inns, blacksmith, and three religious buildings. However, of these, only the Church of St Peter and the 17th-century Plough Inn are still used for their intended purpose.

The village also had another pub/lodging, the Golden Cross Inn (or Hotel) across the tracks from the railway station; photographs of the two establishments suggests that the Plough Inn is not the same building. A new village hall was built in 1990 to replace the postwar wooden hut. The old railway line and station are now gone. The four acres of gardens of Court House in the village have been opened under the National Garden Scheme.

== Religion ==
The site contained a church since the late 12th century when it was presented to residents by Ralph le Breton. Originally, it was a chapel of the nearby village of Blockley. The current Grade II listed building, St Peter church, made of Cotswold stone and roofed with slate, was erected in the late 16th Century. Since then, it has been extensively modified; in 1841, for example, it was rebuilt and enlarged. A 1949 description of the building provides these specifics:

The parish church of ST. PETER ... consists of a chancel with a south vestry, nave (50 ft. long), and a west porch and bell turret. No ancient architectural features remain. The small chancel has a traceried east window of four lights; the nave, divided by buttresses into four bays, has a two-light window in each bay in the north and south walls. The entrance is at the west end from a porch that is flanked by a small north chamber and a south staircase to a gallery. Over the porch is an octagonal bell turret lighted by windows in gables, the whole crowned by a small stone spire. The walls are of ashlar, the roofs covered with slates.

A recent report describes the interior of this Grade II listed church:

The interior is simple and unpretentious, and darker than one might expect despite it's [sic] cream-washed walls. The furnishings are mostly of a piece with the building, including the west gallery which supports a modest organ. The only later additions appear to be the mural painting that enlivens the paneling behind the altar and the two stained glass windows at the east end of the nave.

The now deserted medieval village of Ditchford Frary (1066 to 1539) stood about a mile southeast of St Peter church on the Paddle Brook stream. In 1086, Ditchford Frary was held by Robert de Stafford. At one time, the settlement included St. Giles chapel. In 1410, its "mother church" was Great Wolford; the chapel was a ruin by the 17th century and the rectory was annexed to Stretton in 1642. Earthwork evidence of the chapel still existed at the time of the Ordnance Survey of 1967.

== Transportation ==
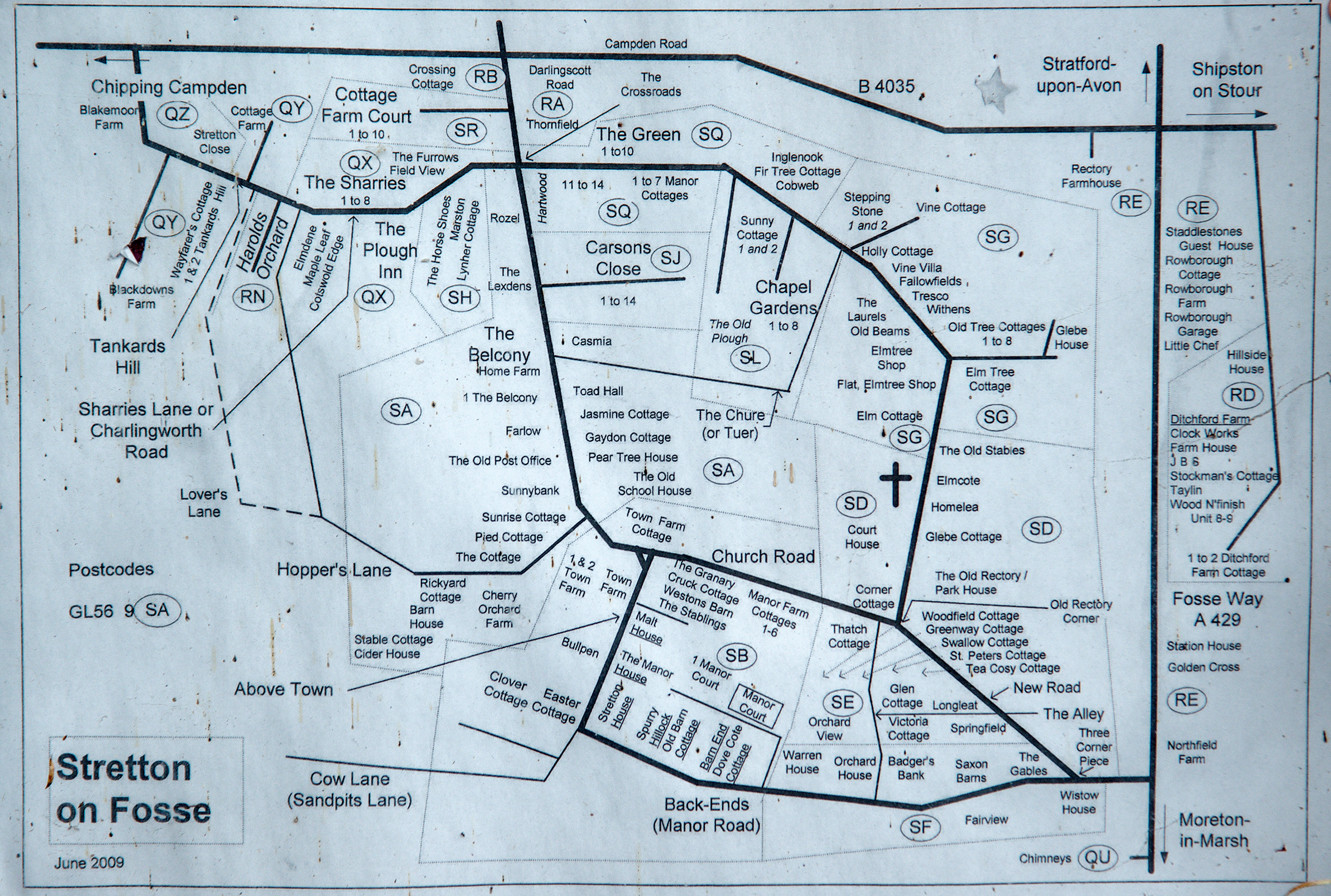
This June 2009 map, posted in the village, defines the use and name of the buildings

By 1825 the Great Western Railway operated a train between Shipston-on-Stour and Moreton-in-Marsh. The Stretton-on-Fosse railway station was not built until November 1892, in the northeastern part of the village near the Fosse Way. Before completion of construction, the train would stop on request at the nearby Golden Cross Inn. Passenger services were discontinued in 1929 and freight services in 1941. A branch line was constructed to Shipston-on-Stour which was used for passengers until 1929 and goods until 1960. The Stratford & Moreton Tramway also stopped at Stretton. The station survives as a guest house. In 2019, there is a direct non-stop Great Western train service from London Paddington to Moreton-in-Marsh which takes under 2 hours.

In 1826 a tram with horse-drawn cars began passing through the village, operated by the Stratford & Moreton Tramway on a four-feet gauge rail. The village is served by bus no's 6 and 51 which give the village connections to the towns of Stratford-upon-Avon, Shipston-on-Stour and Moreton-in-Marsh. The highway route from London to Stretton was via the M4 motorway to the M25 then to the M40 and then to the A429, approximately a two-hour drive.
