= Longdon Road railway station =

Railway station in Warwickshire, England

Longdon Road
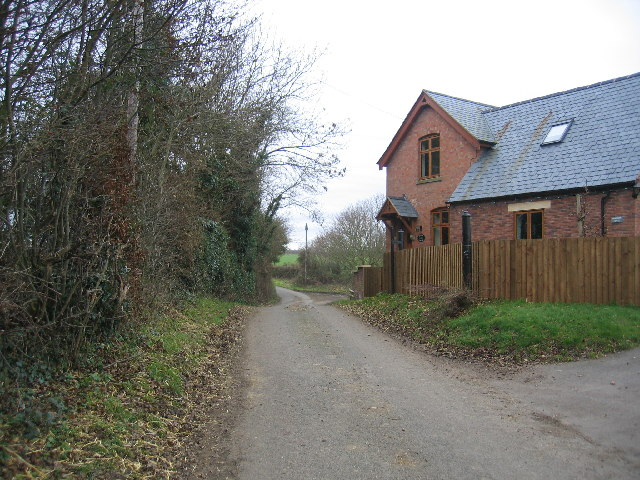
- Site of Longdon Road station level crossing with the station was on the left.

General information
- Location: Darlingscott, Warwickshire; England
- Coordinates: 52.0758°N 1.6699°W
- Platforms: 1

Other information
- Status: Disused

History
- Original company: Stratford and Moreton Tramway
- Post-grouping: Great Western Railway

Key dates
- 11 February 1836 (as tramway station), 1 July 1889 (as railway station): Opened
- 8 July 1929: Closed to passenger services
- 2 May 1960: Closed to freight traffic
Location

Longdon Road railway station served the hamlet of Darlingscott, Warwickshire. It was on the branch line from Moreton-in-Marsh to Shipston.

== History ==
The station was originally opened on the Moreton in Marsh and Shipston Tramway, which was converted to a railway in 1889. The railway closed to passengers in 1929 but remained open for freight until 1960. The track has been dismantled.

== Present day ==
As at 2023 the station platform is in situ but heavily covered by undergrowth.

Preceding station	Disused railways	Following station
Stretton-on-Fosse	Stratford and Moreton Tramway; Later O,W&WR, finally GWR; Shipston-on-Stour branch	Shipston-on-Stour
