= Stretton-on-Fosse railway station =

Railway station in Warwickshire, England

Stretton-on-Fosse

General information
- Location: Stretton-on-Fosse, Stratford; England
- Coordinates: 52.0440°N 1.6681°W
- Platforms: 1

Other information
- Status: Disused

History
- Original company: Great Western Railway
- Post-grouping: Great Western Railway

Key dates
- 1 October 1892: Opened
- 1 January 1917: closed
- 1 January 1919: reopened
- 8 July 1929: Closed to passenger services
- 2 May 1960: Closed to freight traffic
Location

Stretton-on-Fosse railway station was a railway station which served the village of Stretton-on-Fosse, Warwickshire, England. It was located north-east of the village near the Fosse Way road.

== History ==
In 1836 a tram with horse-drawn cars began passing through the village, operated by the Stratford and Moreton Tramway on a four-feet gauge rail. After the company's insolvency in 1868 the line was purchased by The Great Western Railway.

The tramway was converted into a steam operated branch line by the Great Western railway in 1889, between Moreton-in-Marsh and Shipston-on-Stour which was used for passengers until 1929 and goods until 1960. A railway station was not built at Stretton-on-Fosse until October 1892, in the north-east part of the village near the Fosse Way road. Before completion of construction, the train would stop on request at the nearby Golden Cross Inn.

== Present day ==
The site is now in private ownership with the former station masters house still standing. The trackbed has since been returned to agricultural use.

Preceding station	Disused railways	Following station
Moreton-in-Marsh	Stratford and Moreton Tramway; Later O,W&WR, finally GWR; Shipston-on-Stour branch	Longdon Road
