= Chipping Campden railway station =

Former railway station in Gloucestershire, England

Chipping Campden
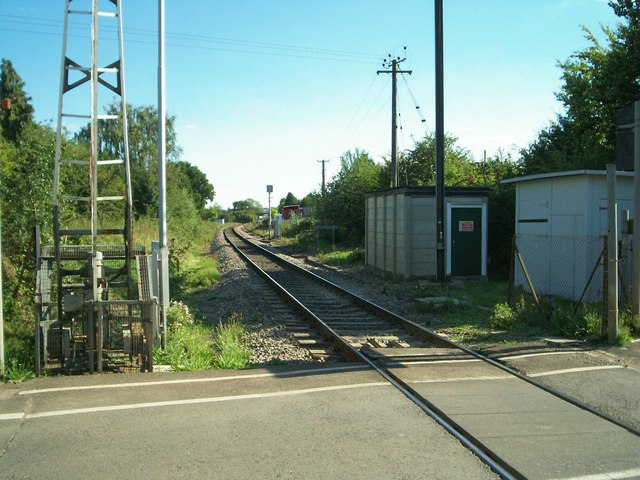
- The station site in 2006.

General information
- Location: Chipping Campden, Cotswold; England
- Coordinates: 52.0550°N 1.7552°W
- Grid reference: SP168397
- Platforms: 2

Other information
- Status: Disused

History
- Original company: Oxford, Worcester and Wolverhampton Railway
- Pre-grouping: Great Western Railway
- Post-grouping: Great Western Railway

Key dates
- 4 June 1853: Opened as Mickleton
- ?: Renamed Campden
- February 1952: Renamed Chipping Campden
- 3 January 1966: Closed
Location

Chipping Campden, or for most of its existence simply Campden, is a former railway station on the Cotswold Line, which served the town of Chipping Campden in Gloucestershire, England.

== History ==
The Oxford, Worcester and Wolverhampton Railway was opened in stages. The section between Evesham and Wolvercot Junction, to the north of Oxford, was opened on 4 June 1853; the station at Campden was opened at the same time and was named Mickleton. It was later renamed Campden and became Chipping Campden in February 1952. It closed on 3 January 1966.

Preceding station	Historical railways	Following station
Mickleton Halt; Line open, station closed	Great Western Railway; Oxford, Worcester and Wolverhampton Railway	Blockley; Line open, station closed

== The site today ==
The Cotswold Line is still in operation, with trains between Oxford and Hereford passing through the former station site; all buildings and platforms have been demolished.

There are proposals for a new station at Chipping Campden.
