= Shipston-on-Stour railway station =

Railway station in Warwickshire, England

Coordinates: 52.0682°N 1.6256°W

Shipston-on-Stour
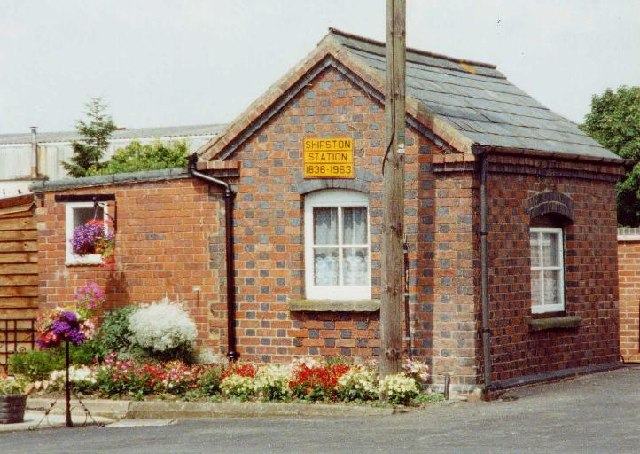
- The former weighbridge at Shipston on Stour station

General information
- Location: Shipston-on-Stour, Stratford-on-Avon; England
- Platforms: 1

Other information
- Status: Disused

History
- Original company: Oxford, Worcester and Wolverhampton Railway
- Post-grouping: Great Western Railway

Key dates
- 11 February 1836 (as tramway station), 1 July 1889 (as railway station): Opened
- 8 July 1929: Closed to passenger services
- 2 May 1960: Closed to freight traffic
Location

Shipston-on-Stour railway station was a railway station which served the town of Shipston-on-Stour, Warwickshire. It was the terminus of the Shipston-on-Stour branch.

== History ==
The station was originally opened in 1836 as part of the Moreton and Shipston Tramway, which was converted to railway use in 1889. The carrying of passengers ceased on 8 July 1929, following which the Great Western Railway instituted a bus service between Banbury and Chipping Norton that ran 8 times daily in each direction. The facility to handling freight was retained until the line closed completely in 1960, after which the track was lifted.

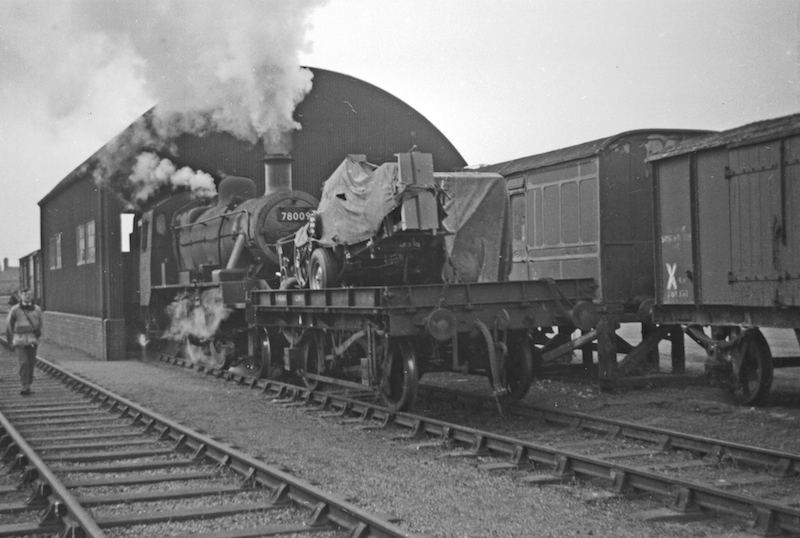
Shipston station during use as a railway

== Present day ==
The wooden passenger station building was demolished sometime in the late 1970s. Portions of the platforms however remained in place and - along with the complete goods station building, livestock pens and engine shed - were utilized by a number of small businesses well into the late 1990s. However, all the buildings were eventually demolished as the site was cleared and built on by a large housing development which also built onto the track formation and goods yard. There are only sections of track bed traceable and the weigh office is now in private use.

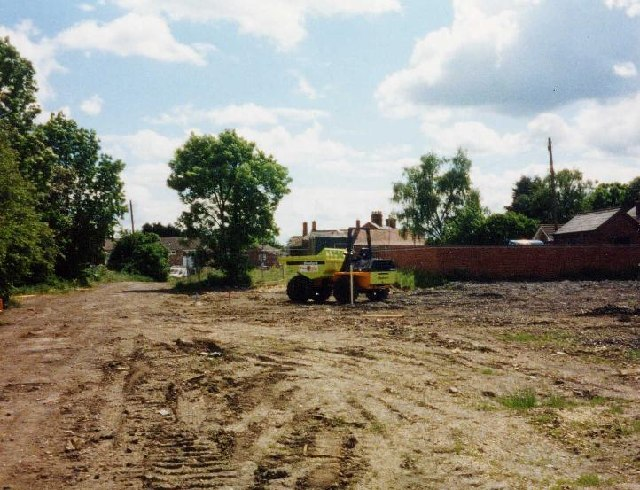
Shipston station site after demolition

Preceding station	Disused railways	Following station
Longdon Road	Stratford and Moreton Tramway; Later O,W&WR, finally GWR; Shipston-on-Stour branch	Terminus
