= Mickleton Halt railway station =

Former railway station in England

Mickleton Halt
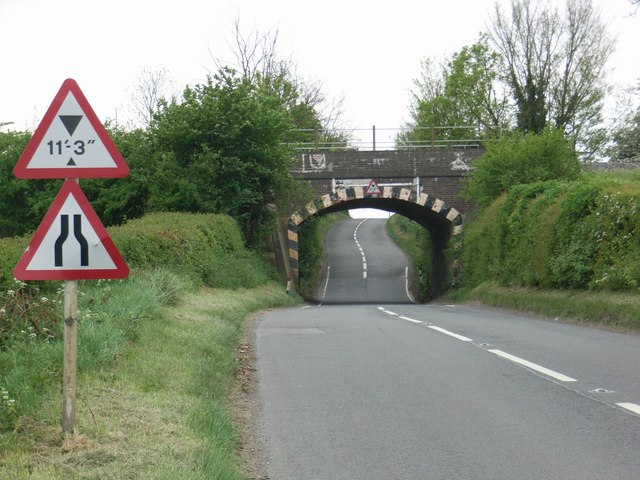
- Station site in 2007; the platforms were to the left of the bridge.

General information
- Location: Mickleton, Gloucestershire, Cotswold; England
- Coordinates: 52.0813°N 1.7832°W
- Grid reference: SP149426
- Platforms: 2

Other information
- Status: Disused

History
- Original company: Great Western Railway
- Post-grouping: Great Western Railway

Key dates
- 4 June 1853: Evesham to Oxford line opened
- 8 November 1937: Opened
- 6 October 1941: Closed
Location

Mickleton Halt was a railway station on the Great Western Railway line between Oxford and Worcester Shrub Hill serving Mickleton and the surrounding villages. The route is now known as the Cotswold Line.

The construction of halt was first announced in June 1937. It featured two platforms with shelters and cost £512 to build. The halt opened on Monday, 8 November 1937, with six daily services in each direction on weekdays and an additional service on Saturdays.

The halt was closed on 6 October 1941.

Preceding station	Historical railways	Following station
Honeybourne; Line and station open	Great Western Railway; Oxford, Worcester and Wolverhampton Railway	Chipping Campden; Line open, station closed
