= Blockley railway station =

Disused railway station in Blockley, Gloucestershire

Blockley
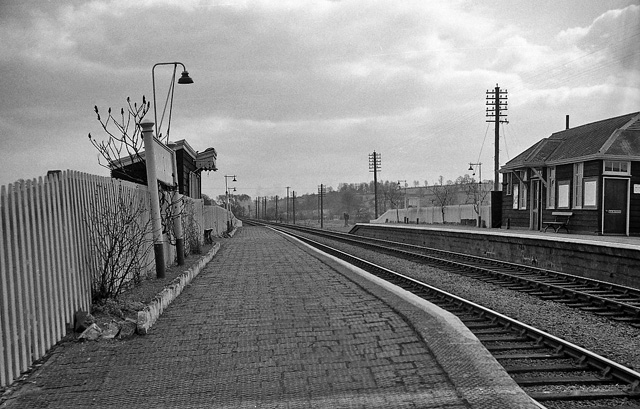
- The station in 1962

General information
- Location: Blockley, Gloucestershire; England
- Coordinates: 52.0304°N 1.7328°W
- Grid reference: SP184369
- Platforms: 2

Other information
- Status: Disused

History
- Original company: Oxford, Worcester and Wolverhampton Railway
- Pre-grouping: Great Western Railway

Key dates
- 4 June 1853: Opened
- 3 January 1966: Closed
Location

Blockley railway station served the village of Blockley, Gloucestershire, England from 1853 to 1966 on the Oxford, Worcester and Wolverhampton Railway.

== History ==
The station opened on 4 June 1853 by the Oxford, Worcester and Wolverhampton Railway. It closed on 3 January 1966 and was demolished shortly after.

Preceding station	Historical railways	Following station
Chipping Campden; Line open, station closed	Oxford, Worcester and Wolverhampton Railway	Moreton-in-Marsh; Line and station open
