= Tredington, Warwickshire =

Village in Warwickshire, England

Coordinates: 52.091°N 1.626°W

Tredington
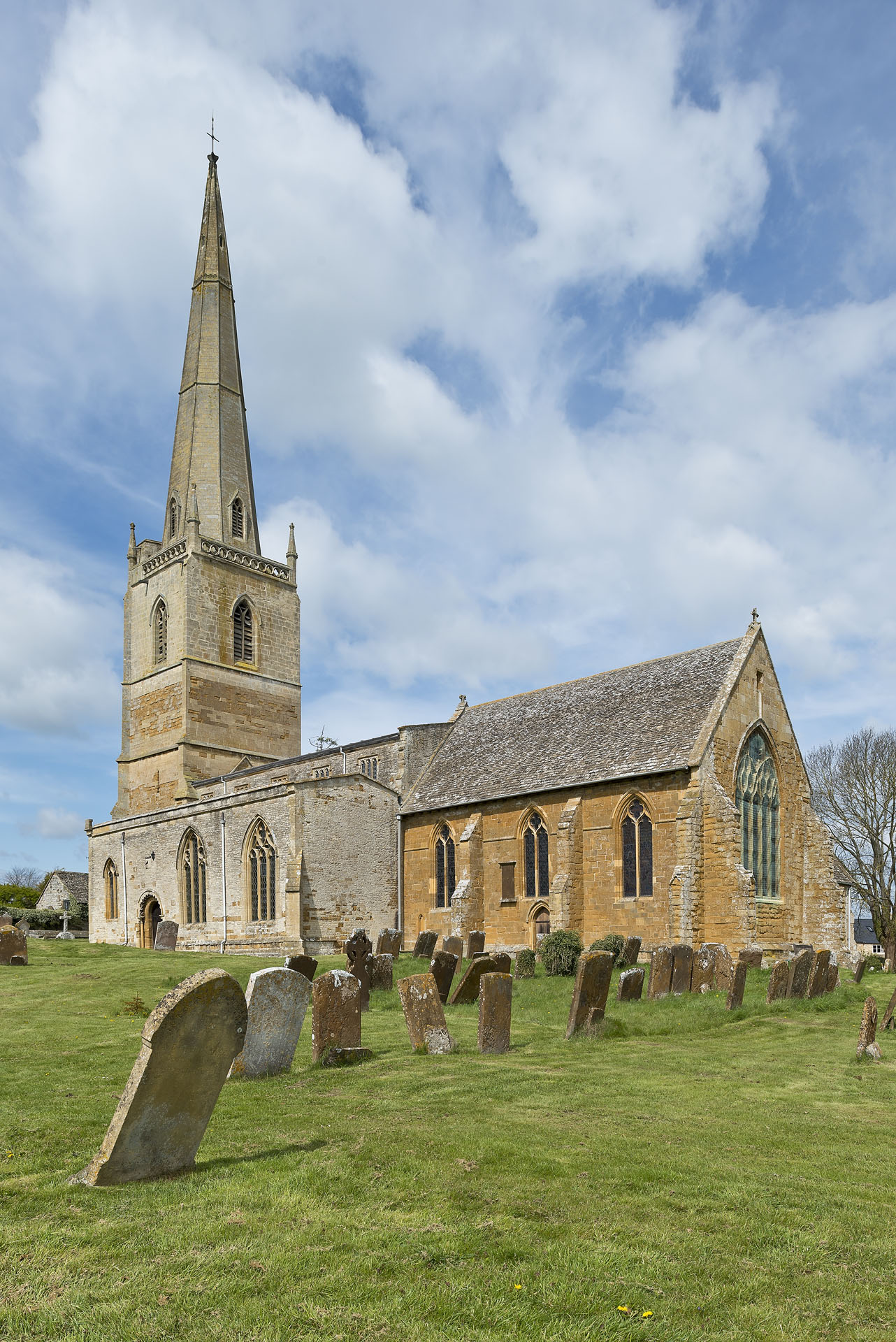
- St Gregory's parish church seen from the southeast

- Location within Warwickshire
- Population: 1,422 (2011 Census)
- OS grid reference: SP257437
- District: Stratford-on-Avon
- Shire county: Warwickshire
- Region: West Midlands
- Country: England
- Sovereign state: United Kingdom
- Post town: Shipston-on-Stour
- Postcode district: CV36
- Dialling code: 01608
- Police: Warwickshire
- Fire: Warwickshire
- Ambulance: West Midlands
- UK Parliament: Stratford-on-Avon
- Website: Tredington Parish Council

Tredington is a village and civil parish on the River Stour in Warwickshire, England. The village is 2 miles (3 km) north of Shipston-on-Stour. The civil parish includes the village of Newbold on Stour and hamlets of Armscote, Blackwell and Darlingscott. The 2011 Census recorded the parish population as 1,422. Tredington civil parish was part of Worcestershire until 1931. The River Stour runs through Tredington.

== History ==
=== Parish church ===
The oldest parts of the Church of England parish church of St Gregory are Anglo-Danish, built around 1000. The building has subsequent phases of work from the 12th, 14th, 15th and 17th or 18th centuries. The building was restored in the 19th century. The west tower is 14th-century and has a tall spire. The church is a Grade I listed building. The west tower has a ring of six bells. George Purdue of Taunton, Somerset cast the third, fourth and tenor bells in 1622. Robert Atton of Buckingham cast the fifth bell in 1624. Matthew I Bagley of Chacombe, Northamptonshire cast the treble bell in 1683. G Mears and Company of the Whitechapel Bell Foundry in London cast the second bell in 1858.

=== Quaker arrest ===
In the years after the Restoration, Nonconformist religious groups were suppressed, including Quakers. Quaker leader George Fox was arrested on a visit to Tredington in 1673.

== Amenities ==
Tredington had an 18th-century pub, the White Lion. that was closed 2019, until It was open again in 2022 after it had a major renovation. Newbold on Stour and Tredington primary school is in Tredington. Tredington no longer has a village shop or filling station. Tredington previously had a Little Chef restaurant, until this was taken over by Channings Diner (circa 1997).

== Bibliography ==
- Lloyd, David (1993), A History of Worcestershire, Chichester: Phillimore, ISBN 9780850336580, LCCN 94109314, OCLC 30027275, OL 1140253M
- Pevsner, Nikolaus; Wedgwood, Alexandra (1966). Warwickshire. The Buildings of England. Harmondsworth: Penguin Books. pp. 434–435.
- Willis-Bund, JW; Page, William, eds. (1913). "Tredington". A History of the County of Worcester. Victoria County History. Vol. III. Westminster: Archibald Constable & Co. pp. 541–551.
