= Shipston-on-Stour branch =

The Shipston-on-Stour branch was a 9-mile (14 km)-long single-track branch railway line that ran between a junction near Moreton-in-Marsh, on the present day Cotswold Line, to Shipston-on-Stour, via two intermediate stations, Longdon Road, and Stretton-on-Fosse.

== History ==
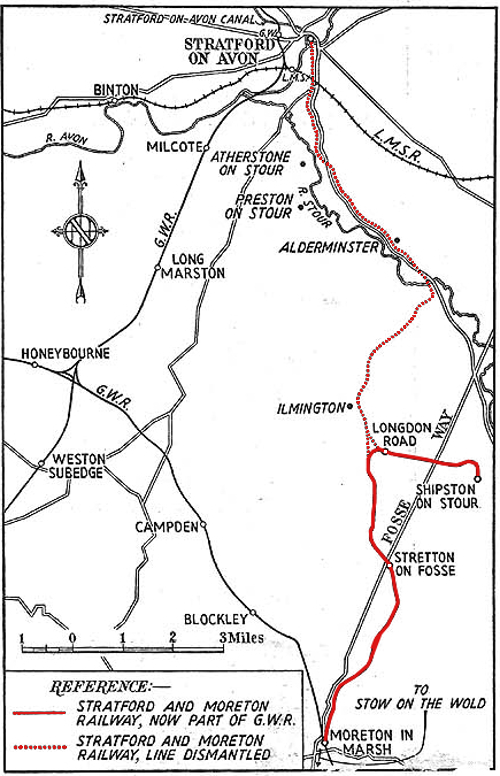
Map from the 1930s of the Stratford and Moreton Tramway; the southern section in use as a railway, and the northern section by this stage abandoned.

The line started life as part of the horse-drawn Stratford and Moreton Tramway that ran between Moreton-in-Marsh and Stratford-Upon-Avon, with a branch to Shipston-on-Stour, which opened on 11 April 1836. The Oxford, Worcester and Wolverhampton Railway (OW&WR) arrived at Moreton-in-Marsh in 1853, and they took over the tramway on a lease. The OW&WR upgraded the line to carry main-line wagons, but because the original authorising legislation prohibited the use of steam, it remained horse powered.

In 1863, the Great Western Railway (GWR) took over the line, and in the 1880s set about converting the southern part of the route from Moreton-in-Marsh to Shipston-on-Stour into a steam operated railway, with the remainder of the route to Stratford allowed to fall into disuse. In order to do this, a new south facing spur had to be constructed near Longdon Road in 1882 to allow trains from Shipston to run south, as previously there was only a north-facing connection to the branch from the Stratford direction. The GWR obtained powers to allow the use of steam locomotives on the line, and finally it was reopened as a steam operated branch on 1 July 1889.

Passenger services ended on 8 July 1929 and goods services on 2 May 1960.

== Operations ==
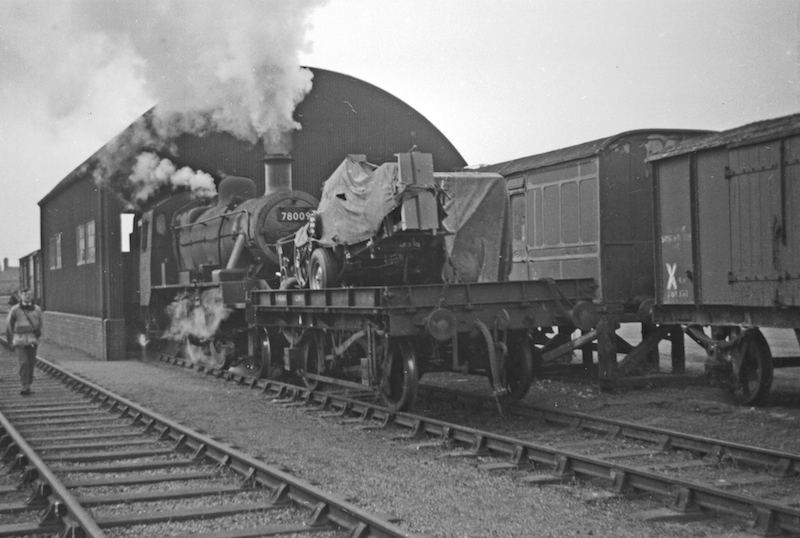
Shipston on Stour station, 26 April 1960, shortly before final closure

The line was single track throughout, without any passing loops, and so it was operated on the 'one engine in steam' principle, with only one train allowed on the branch at any one time. The branch had sharp curves and was steeply graded, and so had stiff speed restrictions, with passenger trains taking 45 minutes to run the 9 miles from Moreton to Shipston.

There were originally four passenger trains, and one goods train per day. From 1922 this was reduced to three passenger trains, until the service was withdrawn and replaced by buses in 1929. The daily goods service continued until the late 1940s when it was reduced to running only a few times per week, until it was withdrawn in 1960.
