= Darlingscott =

Coordinates: 52.07°N 01.66°W

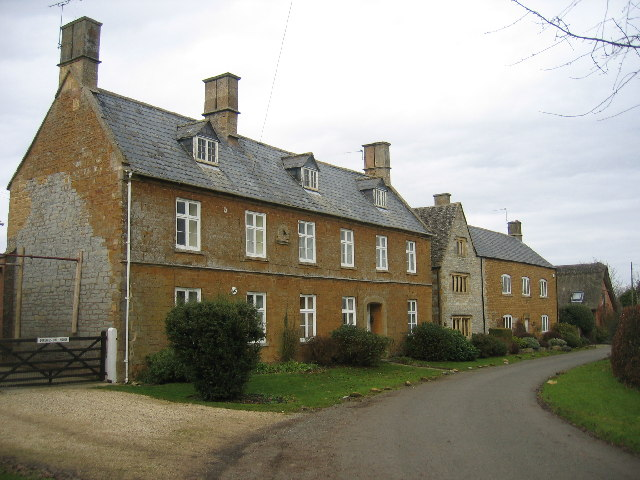
- Darlingscott House (left) and Lower Farmhouse (right), Darlingscott

- Location within Warwickshire
- OS grid reference: SP2342
- Shire county: Warwickshire
- Region: West Midlands
- Country: England
- Sovereign state: United Kingdom
- Post town: Shipston-on-Stour
- Postcode district: CV36
- Police: Warwickshire
- Fire: Warwickshire
- Ambulance: West Midlands

Darlingscott is a hamlet in the civil parish of Tredington, in Warwickshire, England. It is near the A429 road and is 7 miles (11 km) south of the town of Stratford-upon-Avon. Its population is included under Tredington.
