= Armscote =

Coordinates: 52.099808°N 1.646101°W

- Location within Warwickshire
- OS grid reference: SP243446
- District: Stratford-on-Avon
- Shire county: Warwickshire
- Region: West Midlands
- Country: England
- Sovereign state: United Kingdom
- Post town: STRATFORD-UPON-AVON
- Postcode district: CV37
- Police: Warwickshire
- Fire: Warwickshire
- Ambulance: West Midlands

Armscote is a small village three miles north of Shipston-on-Stour in Warwickshire, England. It is a mile off the A429 road, which is the modern line of the Fosse Way Roman road. In 1673 George Fox, the Quaker founder, visited the village. He preached and was then arrested.
