= Moreton-in-Marsh railway station =

Railway station in Gloucestershire, England

Moreton-in-Marsh
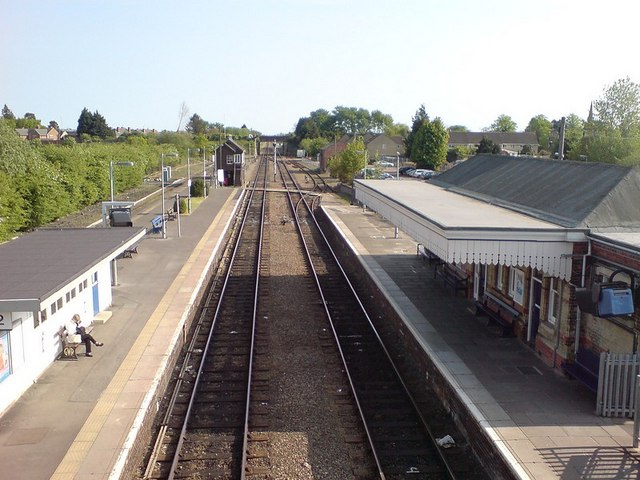

General information
- Location: Moreton-in-Marsh, Cotswold; England
- Coordinates: 51.992°N 1.700°W
- Grid reference: SP207326
- Manager: Great Western Railway
- Platforms: 2

Other information
- Station code: MIM
- Classification: DfT category E

History
- Original company: Oxford, Worcester and Wolverhampton Railway
- Pre-grouping: Great Western Railway
- Post-grouping: GWR

Key dates
- 4 June 1853: Station opened

Passengers
- 2020/21: ▼50,588
- 2021/22: ▲0.200 million
- 2022/23: ▲0.269 million
- 2023/24: ▲0.296 million
- 2024/25: ▲0.376 million
Location
Notes
- Passenger statistics from the Office of Rail and Road

Moreton-in-Marsh railway station serves the town of Moreton-in-Marsh in Gloucestershire, England, and is on the Cotswold Line between Kingham and Honeybourne. The station and all passenger trains serving it are operated by Great Western Railway.

== History ==
The station was opened by the Oxford, Worcester and Wolverhampton Railway (OWW) on 4 June 1853, the day that the southern section of the OWW's main line, between Evesham and Wolvercote Junction (just north of Oxford), was opened. It was once the southern end of the Stratford-upon-Avon to Moreton tramway.

In the early 1970s, 25 miles (40 km) of track from Moreton-in-Marsh to Norton Junction, Worcester, were converted from double to single track, and the station became a passing place. Reduplication of the line was completed in 2011, and Moreton-in-Marsh is once again a station on normal double track, with two side platforms. Between 2000 and 2010, the station was the base of Cotswold Rail, a spot-hire company for shunting and mainline locomotives, which went into liquidation.

In August 2019, the direct Great Western train service from London Paddington station to the Moreton-in-Marsh railway station (code MIM) was expected to take under two hours. The average time to get to the station from Birmingham was 2.75 hours.

== Bilingual signs ==
Several information and direction signs around the station are printed in both English and Japanese. The bilingual signs are for the benefit of tourists because Japanese television promotes the Cotswolds as a holiday destination. The signs were the idea of station manager Teresa Ceesay, who had noticed the popularity of the town with Japanese tourists, and that many asked for information at the station's ticket office. The cost of £350 was met by train operator First Great Western.

== Services ==
Great Western Railway operates all services at Moreton-in-Marsh. The typical off-peak service in trains per hour is:

- 1 tph to London Paddington
- 1 tph to Worcester Foregate Street of which some continue to Great Malvern and Hereford

Preceding station	National Rail	Following station
Honeybourne	Great Western Railway; Cotswold Line	Kingham
	Historical railways	
Blockley	Great Western Railway; Oxford, Worcester and Wolverhampton Railway	Adlestrop
Terminus	Stratford and Moreton Tramway	Stretton-on-Fosse
Terminus	Shipston-on-Stour branch	Stretton-on-Fosse

== In popular culture ==
The station was used in the filming of the BBC2 situation comedy, Butterflies.
