= Shipston-on-Stour =

Town in Warwickshire, England

Coordinates: 52.060°N 1.623°W

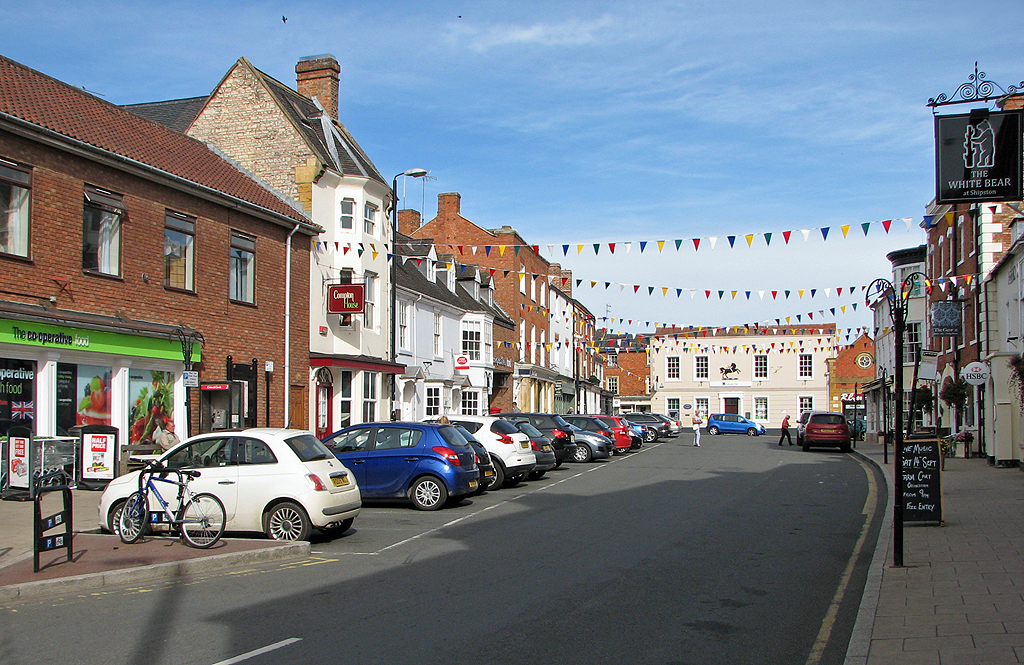
- High Street, Shipston-on-Stour.

- Location within Warwickshire
- Area: 4.92 km^{2} (1.90 sq mi)
- Population: 5,849 (2021 Census)
  - Density: 1,189/km^{2} (3,080/sq mi)
- OS grid reference: SP2540
- Civil parish: Shipston-on-Stour
- District: Stratford-on-Avon
- Shire county: Warwickshire
- Region: West Midlands
- Country: England
- Sovereign state: United Kingdom
- Post town: SHIPSTON-ON-STOUR
- Postcode district: CV36
- Dialling code: 01608
- Police: Warwickshire
- Fire: Warwickshire
- Ambulance: West Midlands
- UK Parliament: Stratford-on-Avon
- Website: Shipston-on-Stour Town Council

Shipston-on-Stour is a town and civil parish in the Stratford-on-Avon District in southern Warwickshire, England. It is located on the banks of the River Stour, 9 miles (15 km) south-southeast of Stratford-upon-Avon, 10 miles (16 km) north-northwest of Chipping Norton, 14 miles (22 km) south of Warwick and 14.5 miles (23 km) west of Banbury. In the 2021 census, Shipston-on-Stour had a population of 5,849.

This area is sometimes termed the Vale of Red Horse, close to the Oxfordshire and Gloucestershire borders.

== History ==
=== Etymology linked to sheep and wool trade ===
In the 8th century, the toponym was Scepwaeisctune, Old English for Sheep-wash-Town. It had a sheep marketplace for many centuries. The name evolved through Scepwestun in the 11th century, Sipestone, Sepwestun and Schipton in the 13th century and Sepestonon-Sture in the 14th century.

=== Church (vestry) administration, township and parish formation ===
It was a township in the parish of Tredington until 1720: when they were separated by a Local Act of the 6th year of George I. The town proved prosperous and generous to its church community: the Church of England parish church of Saint Edmund has a 15th-century tower. The Gothic Revival architect G.E. Street designed the rebuilding of the rest of the church in 1855. The tower had a ring of five bells until 1695 when they were recast and rehung as a ring of six. Since then all the bells have been recast and rehung from time to time, notably in 1754 and by John Taylor & Co. in 1979.

=== A staging post for stagecoaches and regional market ===
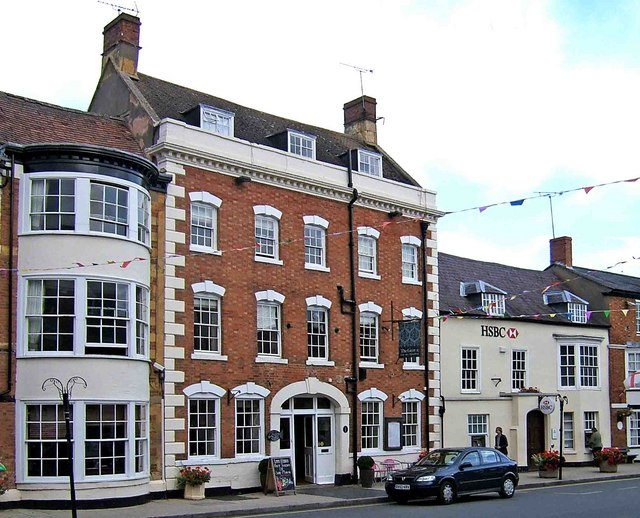
The George Hotel, a Georgian former coaching inn on High Street

Shipston is on the A3400 (formerly part of the A34) between Stratford-upon-Avon and Oxford; it was from the 1600s to 1800s a staging place for stagecoaches. There are former coaching inns, such as the Coach and Horses, in the High Street, which has many listed buildings.

From 1836, agricultural produce and manufactured goods were brought by a branch line from the horse-drawn Stratford and Moreton Tramway, which had been built ten years before to link Moreton-in-Marsh with Stratford on Avon. In 1889 the Great Western Railway upgraded the line to allow the operation of steam trains from Moreton to Shipston. Passenger services to the town's railway station were withdrawn in 1929 and goods services ceased in 1960.

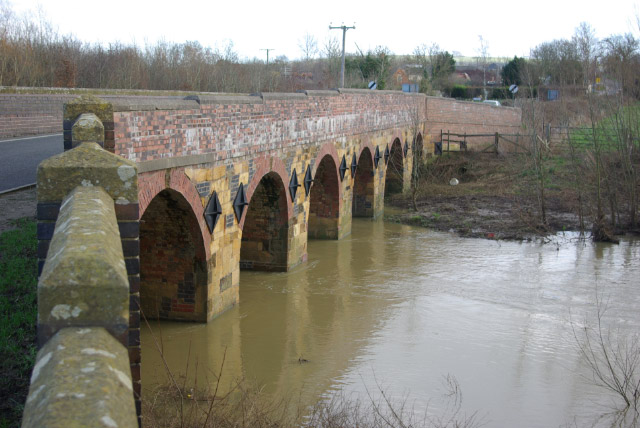
Shipston Bridge, over the River Stour

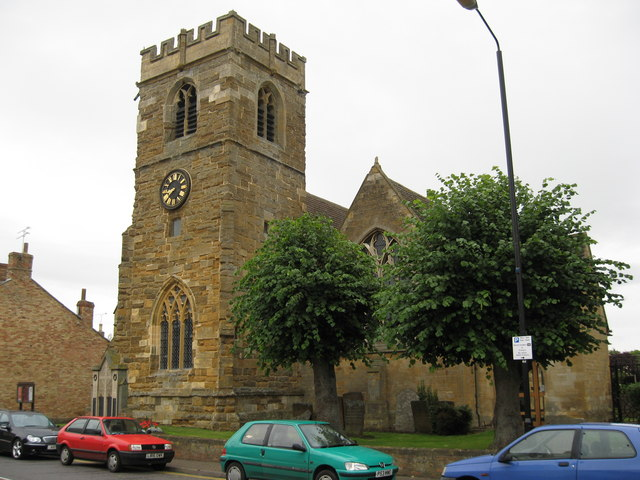
St Edmund's Church, Shipston

=== Early Victorian times ===
The town's first library and reading room were founded in 1837. Manufacture of shag fabric for deep-pile carpets was for some decades an important business, but by 1848 the town had little manufacture or commerce even though it had more than 1800 residents. Worcester Cathedral owned the manorial rights for centuries, and even in the 1840s held a court annually, at which a town constable was appointed. Powers of the short-lived county debt court, established in 1847, extended over Shipston's civil registration district (established 1837). In that era the market was on Saturday and fairs in April, June, August and October. The rectory had Tidmington annexed and received net income of £700. The patrons were Worcester Cathedral and Jesus College, Oxford, the former presenting (appointing the priest) to every third vacancy. The church had extra seats, a gallery, erected in 1790. Baptists, the Society of Friends, and Wesleyans each had a place of worship; and at Foxcote, in the parish, was a Roman Catholic chapel. A National school was endowed with about £130 per annum; and "various small bequests" were distributed among the poor.

=== Poor law union and rural district ===
Shipston poor law union (c.1830–1894) administered those functions in 37 parishes or places: 20 in Warwickshire, 13 in Gloucestershire, and 4 in Worcestershire; across in the 1840s a population of 19,685 people.

From 1894, until 1974, the offices and Council meetings of Shipston-on-Stour Rural District were in Shipston.

=== County exclave ===
Shipston was in an exclave of Worcestershire (as part of Oswaldslow hundred) until 1931, when it was transferred to Warwickshire.

== Amenities ==
The Sports Club has football, cricket, bowls, tennis and angling clubs. Shipston First Scout Group has Beaver (ages 6–8), Cub (ages 8–10½) and Scout (ages 10½–14) sections. Shipston on Stour Rugby Football Club currently plays in the Midlands 3 West (South) league. Shipston has a brass band.

Shipston has a small museum located off Telegraph Street. The museum was set up, and is run by local people. It is stocked with artefacts and memorabilia relating to the town and the surrounding villages.

=== Public services ===
The two schools serving the town are Shipston Primary School, and Shipston High School. The town also has a library, operated by the county council.

There is a small NHS community hospital serving the town; the Ellen Badger Hospital.

The Warwickshire Fire and Rescue Service operate a retained fire station in Shipston-on-Stour.

== Transport ==
The A3400 road runs through Shipston, and links it with Stratford-upon-Avon to the north-west, and to Chipping Norton and Oxford to the south-east. The A429 road passes to the west, using part of the historic Fosse Way, which connect Shipston with Warwick to the north, and Tewkesbury to the south-west.

The nearest railway station to Shipston today is Moreton-in-Marsh railway station on the Cotswold Line around 6 miles (9.7 km) to the south. Shipston once had its own railway station at the end of a branch line, which had its passenger services withdrawn in 1929, and goods services in 1960.

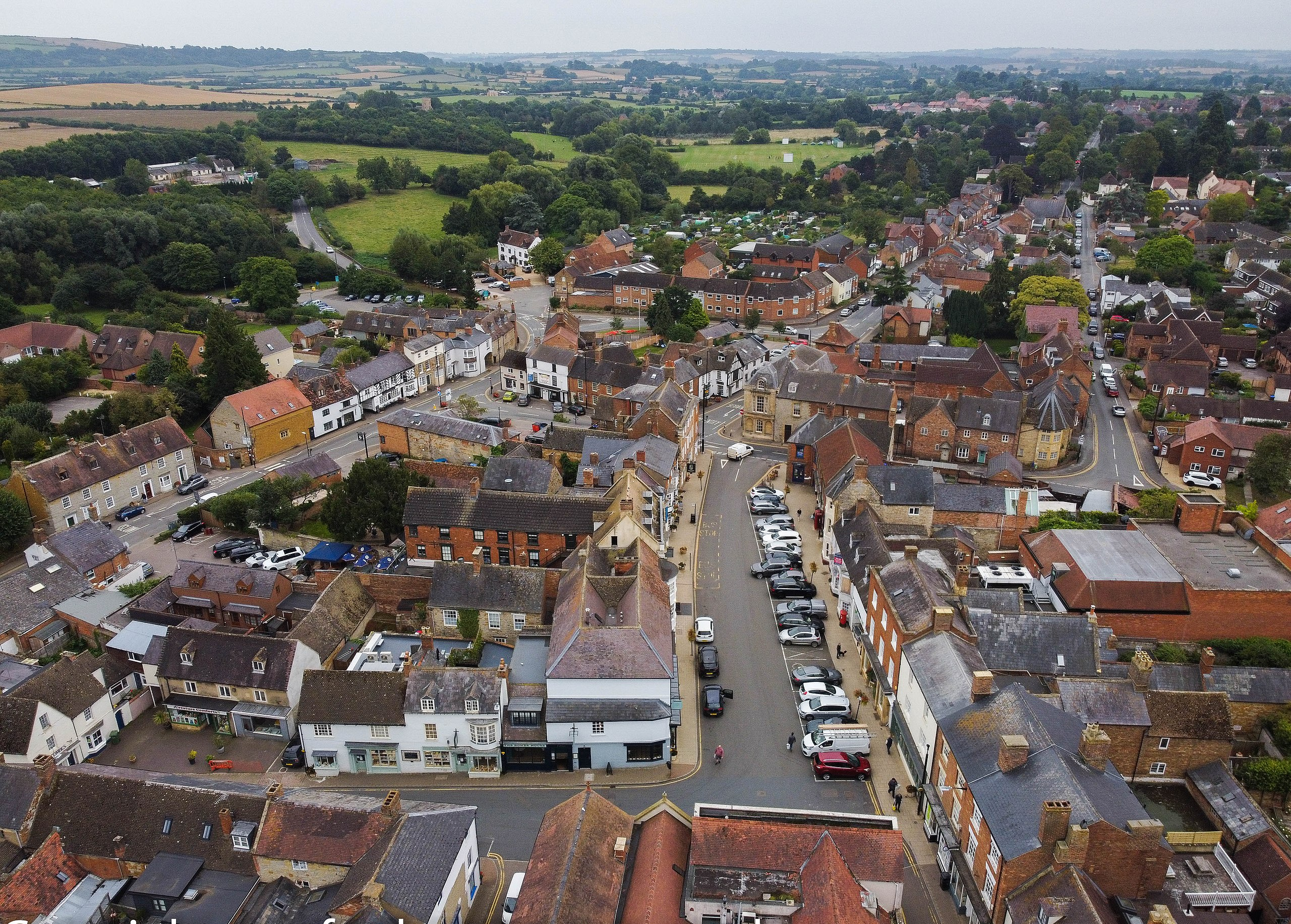
Aerial view of Shipston town centre

== Media ==
Local TV coverage is provided by BBC West Midlands and ITV Central. Television signals are received from either the Lark Stoke or Sutton Coldfield TV transmitters.

Local radio stations are BBC CWR, Capital Mid-Counties, Heart West Midlands, Hits Radio Coventry & Warwickshire, Fresh (Coventry & Warwickshire), and Radio Warneford which broadcast to patients at the Ellen Badger Hospital in the town.

The town is served by these local newspapers, Evesham Journal and Coventry Telegraph.

== Governance ==
Shipton-on-Stour is a civil parish which falls within areas of Stratford-on-Avon District Council and Warwickshire County Council, each responsible for different aspects of local government. The lowest tier of local government is Shipston Town Council, a parish council, which has 13 elected councillors.

Shipston is within the Parliamentary constituency of Stratford-on-Avon.

== Notable people ==
Notable people connected with Shipston include:

- Cy Endfield (1914–1995) American-born director of such notable films as Hell Drivers and Zulu; he had emigrated to England and lived and died in Shipston after being blacklisted as a Communist during the McCarthy era.
- Francis J. Haverfield (1860–1919) - 19th-century archaeologist, born in Shipston.
- Tessa Jowell (1947–2018) - former Labour politician and government minister, lived at Shipston-on-Stour at the time of her death in 2018.
- Joseph Mawle (1974) film and TV actor, born in Oxford, but grew up in Shipston.
- Richard Morant (1945–2011) - film and TV actor, born in Shipston.
- Edward William Mountford (1855–1908) architect, born in Shipston.

== Cultural references ==
Robin Gibb of the Bee Gees mentioned Shipston in his song "Cold Be My Days", which contains the lyrics "Cold be my days in Shipston-on-Stour": The song was recorded in 1970, but not released until 2015 for the unfinished album Sing Slowly Sisters. He stated in a BBC Radio 4 interview in May 2007 that this relates to his youthful experiences, riding horses with his brother Barry.

- A traditional Warwickshire ballad was reharmonised by Ralph Vaughan Williams and, entitled Shipston, is used for the hymn 'Firmly I believe and truly' by Cardinal John Henry Newman 1801-1890 (New English Hymnal #360).

== Sources ==
- Allen, Geoff (2000). Warwickshire: Towns and Villages. Towns & villages of Britain. Sigma Leisure. ISBN 1-85058-642-X.
- Pevsner, Nikolaus; Wedgwood, Alexandra (1966). Warwickshire. The Buildings of England. Harmondsworth: Penguin Books. pp. 395–396.
- "Shipston-on-Stour". A History of the County of Worcester, Volume 3. Victoria County History. London. 1913. pp. 521–524.
