= Stratford and Moreton Tramway =

Horse-drawn wagonway in England

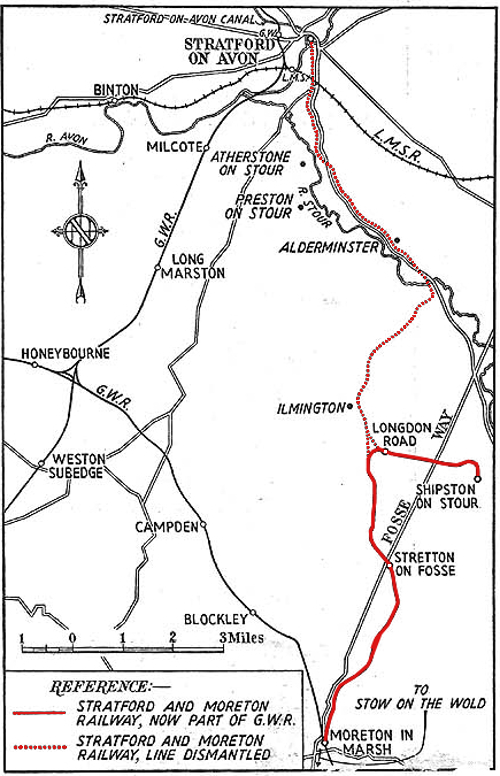
Map of the tramway, from 1930s; the northern section having been dismantled by this stage, and the Moreton-Shipston section in use as a railway

The Stratford and Moreton Tramway was a 16-mile (25-km) long horse-drawn wagonway which ran from the canal basin at Stratford-upon-Avon in Warwickshire to Moreton-in-Marsh in Gloucestershire, with a branch to Shipston-on-Stour. The main line opened in 1826, whilst the branch to Shipston opened in 1836.

The tramway was used to carry Black Country coal to the rural districts of southern Warwickshire via the Stratford-on-Avon Canal, and limestone and agricultural produce northwards.

The northern part of the tramway had fallen into disuse by the early 1900s and was dismantled in 1918. The southern section between Moreton-in-Marsh and Shipston-on-Stour was converted into a steam railway in 1889 and continued in use as a minor branch line until 1960.

== Background ==
Stratford and Moreton Railway Act 1821
- Act of Parliament
- Parliament of the United Kingdom
- Long title: An Act for making and maintaining a Railway or Tramroad from Stratford upon Avon in the County of Warwick to Moreton in Marsh in the County of Gloucester, with a Branch to Shipston upon Stour in the County of Worcester.
- Citation: 1 & 2 Geo. 4. c. lxiii

Dates
- Royal assent: 28 May 1821

Text of statute as originally enacted

The act of Parliament for the line, the Stratford and Moreton Railway Act 1821 (1 & 2 Geo. 4. c. lxiii), was passed in May 1821 and construction was completed in 1826, the route having been surveyed by the railway promoter William James and engineered by John Urpeth Rastrick.

The tramway was built as part of an early and ambitious scheme known as the Central Junction Railway promoted by William James, to link the Midlands with London via canal between Birmingham and Stratford-upon-Avon, tramway to Oxford, and finally by river barge down the River Thames to London. However, only part of this route, to Moreton-in-Marsh, and one of the three planned branches was ever built. Sources disagree on the gauge of the tramway; several cite a gauge of 4 ft (1,219 mm), while one states it was built to the 1,435 mm (4 ft 8 1/2 in) gauge adopted by George Stephenson in the north-east of England.

Stratford and Moreton Railway (Shipston-upon-Stour Branch) Act 1833
- Act of Parliament
- Parliament of the United Kingdom
- Long title: An Act for enabling the Stratford and Moreton Railway Company to make a new Branch of Railway to Shipston-upon-Stour in the County of Worcester.
- Citation: 3 & 4 Will. 4. c. lxx

Dates
- Royal assent: 10 June 1833

Text of statute as originally enacted

The branch to Shipston-on-Stour, was authorised by the Stratford and Moreton Railway (Shipston-upon-Stour Branch) Act 1833 (3 & 4 Will. 4. c. lxx) on 10 June 1833, and opened on 11 February 1836.

== Operational history ==
Wagon of the former Stratford and Moreton Tramway, on display in Stratford-upon-Avon

Goods traffic was conveyed by licensed carriers in their own wagons. They could also purchase a further licence costing £12 per annum, to carry passengers.

By 1829, the tramway was making an operating profit, although the profits were not sufficient to pay off the considerable debts which the tramway had accrued.

The steam hauled Oxford, Worcester and Wolverhampton Railway (OW&WR) opened in 1853 serving Moreton-in-Marsh with a new railway station, which severed the terminal buildings from the branch. This had compelled the OW&WR to take over the tramway on a perpetual lease from 1 May 1847. The OW&WR itself became part of the Great Western Railway (GWR) in 1863. The OW&WR upgraded the line all the way to Stratford to carry main-line wagons, albeit still horse-drawn, as the original act of Parliament forbade the use of steam locomotives; although this enabled some through traffic to operate, it did not do much to improve the fortunes of the line, and in 1859 the OW&WR opened a branch to Stratford from Honeybourne which took most of the through traffic, and which ended any hopes of the tramway becoming a financial success. Although the tramway continued to carry some traffic, by 1904, the northern section of the tramway to Stratford had become disused, and the tracks were lifted in 1918 as a wartime economy measure. The line was formally abandoned by the Great Western Railway Act 1926 (16 & 17 Geo. 5. c. lxxxviii), exactly 100 years after it had been opened.

The southern portion of the tramway between Moreton and Shipston-on-Stour however lasted longer: The GWR upgraded the line to allow it to be converted it into a conventional steam railway; to do this they had to obtain authority in section 64 of the Great Western Railway (No. 1) Act 1884 (47 & 48 Vict. c. ccxxxv) to allow the use of steam locomotives. The line reopened in its new form on 1 July 1889 with locomotive operation, It therefore became the Shipston-on-Stour branch of the Great Western Railway. The sharp curves of the tramway alignment made it a slow journey. A passenger service of four trains each way per-day operated until 8 July 1929. Goods operation continued until closure on 2 May 1960.

== Remains ==
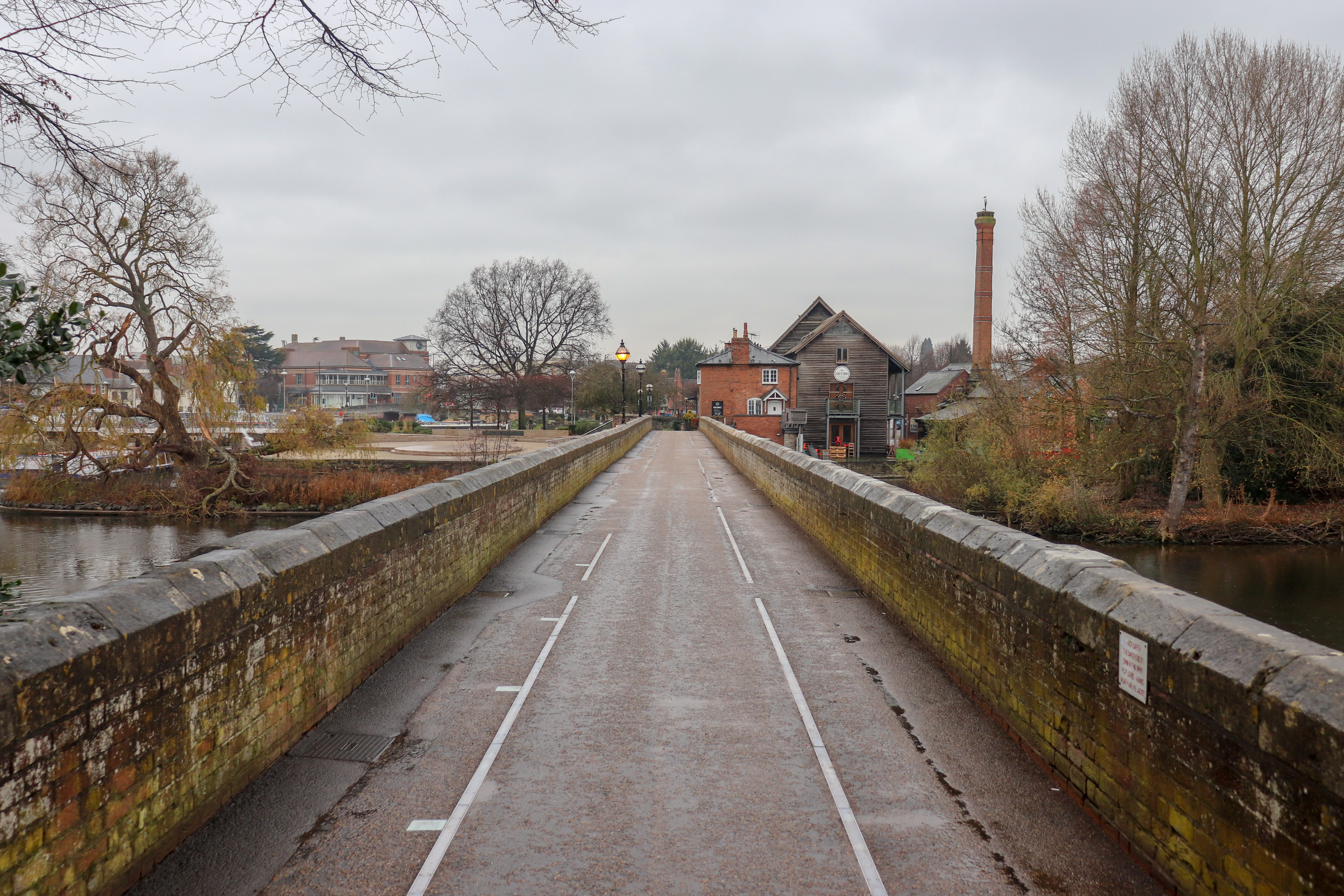
The Tramway Bridge at Stratford-upon-Avon. The 'rail lines' seen are illuminated strips.

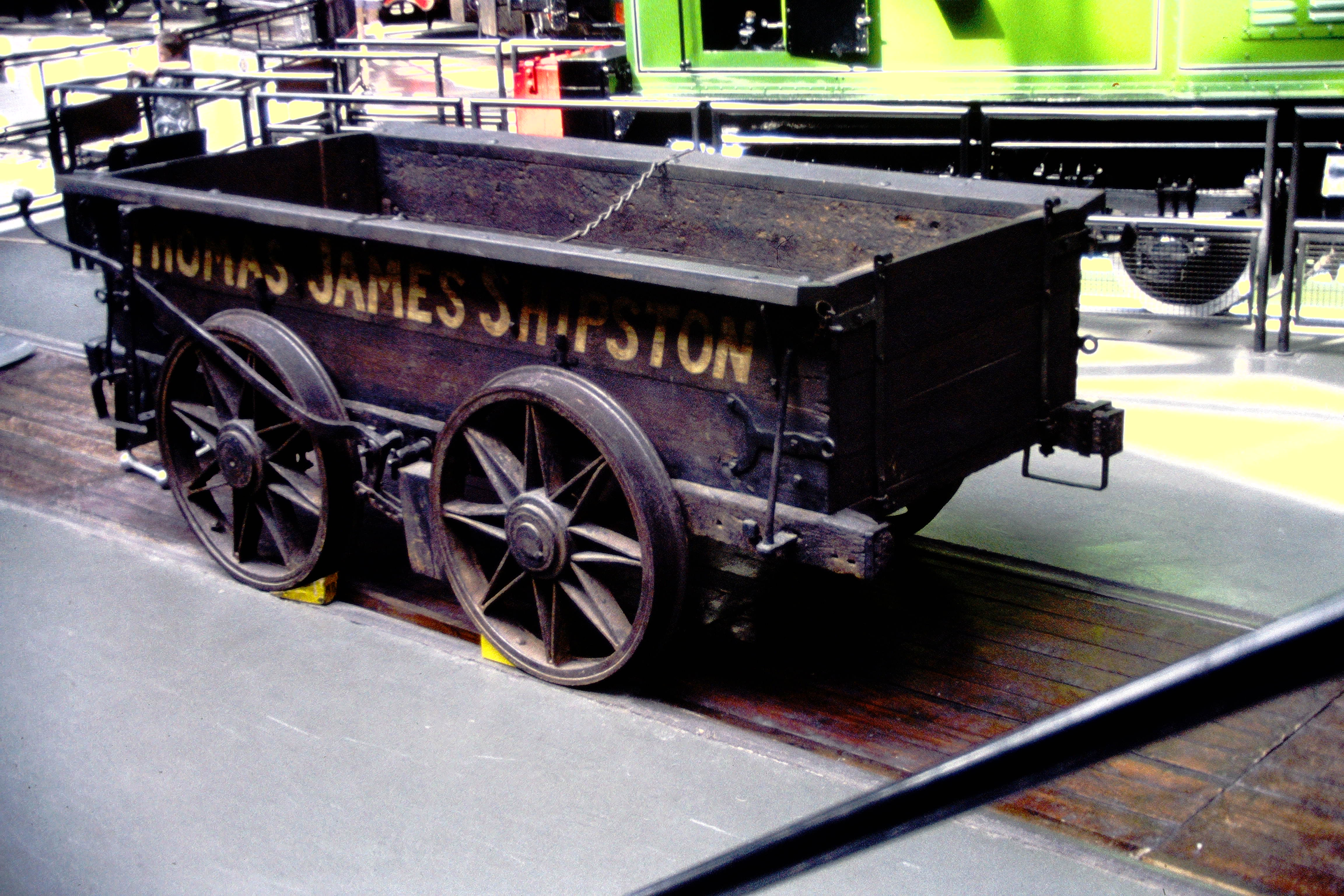
Old wagon, dating from c 1840 used by Thomas James, coal merchant, Shipston-on-Stour, at the National Railway Museum at York

The most prominent remaining piece of infrastructure, is the tramway's brick arch bridge across the River Avon at Stratford, which remains in use as a public footbridge, and is still known as the Tramway Bridge.

One of the horse-drawn wagons, which belonged to Thomas Hutchings of Newbold Lime Works, is preserved a short distance north of the Tramway Bridge, near the Shakespeare Memorial Theatre in Stratford-on-Avon, which sits on a short stretch of preserved tramway track on stone blocks. Newbold Lime Works would have been at Newbold on Stour.

Another old coal wagon from the tramway is preserved at the National Railway Museum at York. This dates from c. 1840, and was formerly used by Thomas James, Coal Merchant, Shipston-on-Stour.

== Uses since closure ==
In 2020, as a result of more people walking and cycling during the COVID-19 pandemic, a community interest company called Old Tramway Revived was set up with the aim to reopen more of the old tramway route south from Stratford-upon-Avon alongside the A3400 as an active transportation corridor towards Shipston. The company has already received support from several of the local councils, and in a presentation to the Stratford Society it was noted that there was a previous abandoned attempt to reopen the route in the mid 1980s that used Manpower Services Commission labour to clear some of the line.
