= List of railway stations in Worcestershire =

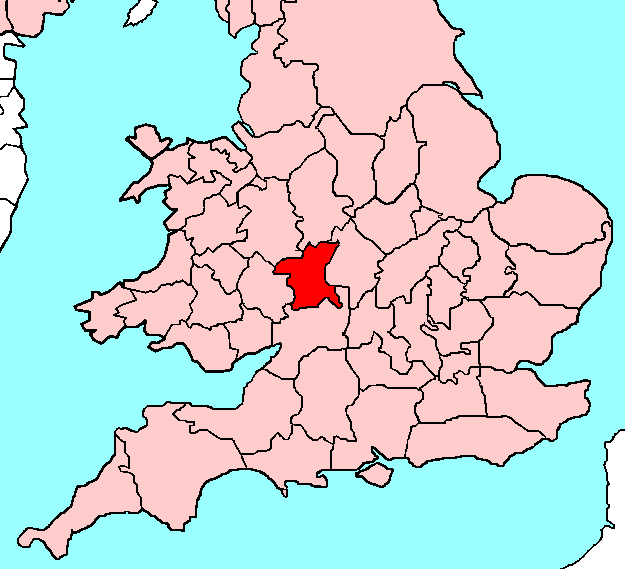
Map showing the location of Worcestershire within the United Kingdom

This is a list of railway stations in Worcestershire, one of the counties of the United Kingdom. It includes all railway stations in Worcestershire that form part of the British National Rail network that currently have timetabled train services. It does not include stations on heritage railways, except for those stations which are shared with those on the National Rail Network.

The main train operating company is West Midlands Railway who operate the majority of services in the county. However Great Western Railway operates the Worcester - London service. CrossCountry operates some services at Worcestershire Parkway.

The main rail routes in Worcestershire include:

- Birmingham to Worcester via Bromsgrove line
- Birmingham to Worcester via Kidderminster line
- Cotswold Line
- Cross-City Line

== Stations ==
The following table lists the name of each station, along with the year it first opened, and the district in which it is situated. The table also shows the train operating companies who currently serve each station and the final three columns give information on the number of passengers using each station in recent years, as collated by the Office of Rail and Road, a government body. The figures are based on ticket sales.

Station	Year opened	District	Served by	Station users 2024–25	Station users 2023–24	Station users 2022–23
Alvechurch	1852	Bromsgrove	West Midlands Railway	163,368	151,042	123,554
Barnt Green	1840	Bromsgrove	West Midlands Railway	327,146	297,650	246,496
Blakedown	1852	Wyre Forest	West Midlands Railway	96,472	88,008	72,972
Bromsgrove	1840	Bromsgrove	West Midlands Railway	695,994	591,650	513,174
Droitwich Spa	1852	Wychavon	West Midlands Railway	519,318	463,582	397,054
Evesham	1852	Wychavon	Great Western Railway	287,118	258,370	245,142
Great Malvern	1859	Malvern Hills	Great Western Railway; West Midlands Railway	428,770	400,852	367,552
Hagley	1862	Bromsgrove	West Midlands Railway	494,246	440,434	361,810
Hartlebury	1852	Wyre Forest	West Midlands Railway	66,184	50,794	44,184
Honeybourne	1852	Wychavon	Great Western Railway	113,180	92,244	85,768
Kidderminster	1852	Wyre Forest	West Midlands Railway	1,242,114	1,128,558	915,886
Malvern Link	1859	Malvern Hills	Great Western Railway; West Midlands Railway	320,672	317,688	302,128
Pershore	1852	Wychavon	Great Western Railway	115,878	101,244	103,874
Redditch	1859	Redditch	West Midlands Railway	910,428	848,484	685,240
Worcester Foregate Street	1860	Worcester	Great Western Railway; West Midlands Railway	1,914,248	1,747,674	1,582,976
Worcester Shrub Hill	1852	Worcester	Great Western Railway; West Midlands Railway	577,194	526,970	477,310
Worcestershire Parkway	2020	Worcester	CrossCountry; Great Western Railway	456,184	339,060	334,658
Wythall	1908	Bromsgrove	West Midlands Railway	65,636	58,554	51,570

== See also ==
- List of railway stations in the West Midlands
- List of railway stations in Merseyside
- List of railway stations in Greater Manchester
- List of railway stations in Wales
- List of London railway stations
