= Hatfield, Worcestershire =

Hamlet in Worcestershire, England

Coordinates: 52.149°N 2.182°W

Hatfield
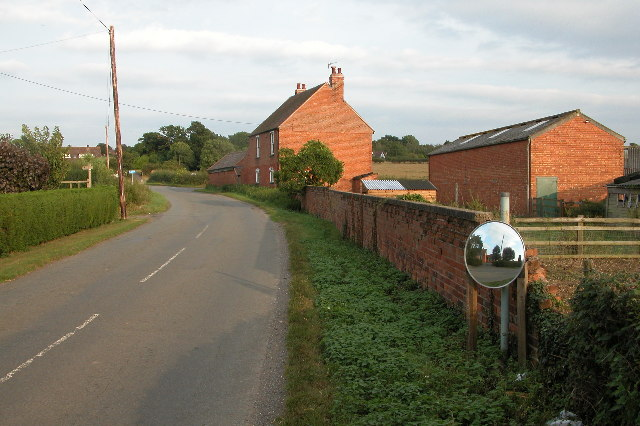

- Location within Worcestershire
- OS grid reference: SO876500
- District: Wychavon
- Shire county: Worcestershire
- Region: West Midlands
- Country: England
- Sovereign state: United Kingdom
- Post town: WORCESTER
- Postcode district: WR5
- Dialling code: 01905
- Police: West Mercia
- Fire: Hereford and Worcester
- Ambulance: West Midlands

Hatfield is a small hamlet in the district of Wychavon near the city of Worcester, in England. It is surrounded by the villages of Littleworth, Norton, Pirton & Kempsey.

A regular bus service operates through the nearby village of Littleworth, allowing riders to travel west into Worcester or east into Pershore. The village is close to junction 7 of the M5 motorway.

A Norton-Juxta-Kempsey Church of England First School is located in the bordering village of Littleworth. Places of social interest near Hatfield include the two country pubs which sit between it, 'The Inn' along 'Stonehall Common and 'The Retreat' on the outskirts of Littleworth. Littleworth possess a typical 'Parish Hall', home to children's playgroup sessions and various evening/weekend clubs.
