= Astwood Halt railway station =

Former railway station in Worcestershire, England

Astwood Halt

General information
- Location: Worcester, Worcestershire; England
- Coordinates: 52.2070°N 2.2041°W
- Grid reference: SO861565
- Platforms: 2

Other information
- Status: Disused

History
- Original company: Great Western Railway
- Post-grouping: Great Western Railway

Key dates
- 1936: Opened
- 25 September 1939: Last Train
- 1940: Officially closed
Location

Astwood Halt railway station was a station in Worcester, Worcestershire, England. The station was opened in 1936 and closed in 1940.

Preceding station	Disused railways	Following station
Blackpole Halt; Line open, station closed	Great Western Railway; Oxford, Worcester and Wolverhampton Railway	Worcester Shrub Hill; Line and station open
Blackpole Halt; Line open, station closed	Great Western Railway; Oxford, Worcester and Wolverhampton Railway	Worcester Foregate Street; Line and station open
