= Henwick (disambiguation) =

Henwick is a suburb of Worcester, England.

Henwick may also refer to:

- Henwick railway station, a former station in Henwick, Worcester
- Jessica Henwick (born 1992), English actress
