= Norton-juxta-Kempsey =

Civil parish in Worcestershire, England

Coordinates: 52.151°N 2.174°W

- St James' Church, Norton in 2025

- Location within Worcestershire
- Population: 2,458 (2021)
- OS grid reference: SO879509
- Civil parish: Norton-juxta-Kempsey
- District: Wychavon
- Shire county: Worcestershire
- Region: West Midlands
- Country: England
- Sovereign state: United Kingdom
- Post town: WORCESTER
- Postcode district: WR5
- Police: West Mercia
- Fire: Hereford and Worcester
- Ambulance: West Midlands
- UK Parliament: Droitwich and Evesham

Norton-juxta-Kempsey is a civil parish to the south of Worcester in the United Kingdom. It contains the villages of Norton and Littleworth. The parish had a population of 2,458 at the 2021 census. As the parish name suggests, it adjoins Kempsey to the west.

The local primary school takes the name of the civil parish and is located in Littleworth. The east of the parish contains Worcestershire Parkway railway station.

"Juxta" is Latin for "next to, alongside".
