= Bransford =

Village in Worcestershire, England

Coordinates: 52.166667°N 2.316667°W

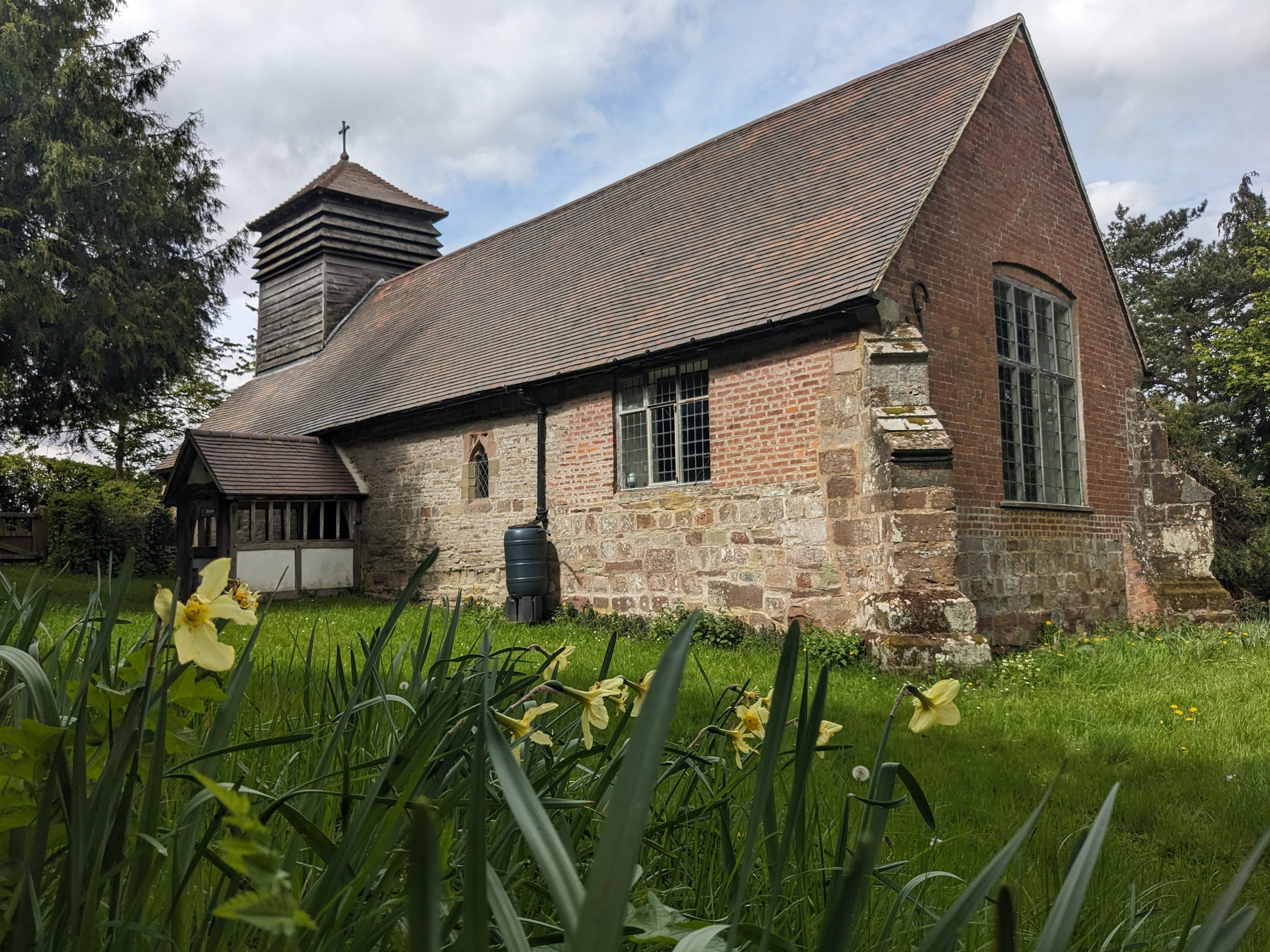
- Church of St John the Baptist

- Location within Worcestershire
- Population: 527 (Parish, 2021)
- OS grid reference: SO791525
  - London: 105 miles (169 km)
- Civil parish: Bransford
- District: Malvern Hills
- Shire county: Worcestershire
- Region: West Midlands
- Country: England
- Sovereign state: United Kingdom
- Post town: WORCESTER
- Postcode district: WR6
- Dialling code: 01886
- Police: West Mercia
- Fire: Hereford and Worcester
- Ambulance: West Midlands

Bransford is a village and civil parish in the Malvern Hills district of Worcestershire, England. It lies 3 miles (5 km) west of Worcester and 4 miles (6 km) north of Malvern. The village is on the A4103, the main road linking Worcester and Hereford. The River Teme forms the northern boundary of the parish. Bransford shares a grouped parish council with the neighbouring parish of Leigh.

== History ==
The origins of the name 'Bransford' are uncertain. It may mean 'hill-top ford' or 'ford at Bragen', derived from the Old English term 'braegen', literally meaning 'crown of the head' but also used topographically to refer to a hill.

Bransford was anciently a manor in the Pershore hundred of Worcestershire. It is listed in the Domesday Book of 1086 as "Bradnesforde".

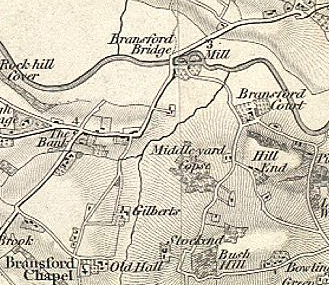
A map showing Bransford in the 19th century

A church dedicated to John the Baptist was built at Bransford in the 13th century. It was never a parish church, being instead a chapel of ease. There is some evidence that Bransford was anciently part of the parish of Powick, but it subsequently became part of the parish of Leigh, and St John's therefore served as a chapel of ease to St Eadburga's Church at Leigh.

Bransford gave its name to Wulstan Bransford, who was born at Bransford and served as Bishop of Worcester from 1338 to 1349. He commissioned the construction of Bransford Bridge across the Teme in 1338, improving the main road from Worcester to the west. The main part of Bransford village now lies on this road, a little way north of St John's and the nearby medieval Manor House, which are relatively isolated from the modern village.

Parish functions under the poor laws from the 17th century onwards were exercised separately for the chapelry of Bransford and the rest of Leigh parish. As such, Bransford became a separate civil parish in 1866 when the legal definition of 'parish' was changed to be the areas used for administering the poor laws. It remained a chapelry of Leigh parish for ecclesiastical purposes. From 1836, both Bransford and Leigh formed part of the Martley Poor Law Union, created under the Poor Law Amendment Act 1834 to collectively deliver certain aspects of the poor laws, including the provision of a workhouse to serve the area at Martley.

Bransford Road railway station opened in 1860 on the Worcester and Hereford Railway, which was later taken over by the Great Western Railway. The station stood a short distance to the east of the village, just over the parish boundary in the neighbouring parish of Powick. The station closed in 1965.

In the 1870s, Bransford was described as

"...a chapelry in Leigh parish, Worcestershire; on the river Teme, adjacent to the Malvern railway, 4½ miles SW by W of Worcester."

St John's remains in use as a chapel; the small building is lit by candlelight. The chapel is now also used by a Greek Orthodox congregation.

=== Occupation ===
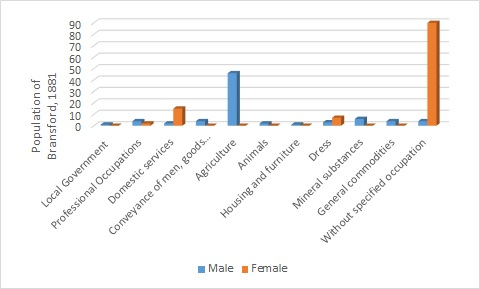
1881 occupational structure of Bransford, Worcestershire, as reported by 1881 census

Bransford was once devoted to pasture and had 2,366 acres of arable land as well as a further 1,062 separate acres of land. There was once a clothing factory by the Teme, explaining why 7 women worked in dress in 1881. There was also a snuff-mill, which then became a corn-mill. When the clothing factory and snuff-mill disappeared, people became involved heavily in agriculture, which explains why in 1881 at least 46 people were engaged in agriculture as their occupation. It was at this time that men were involved in agriculture, whilst women were working in occupations such as domestic services (12 women) and dress services (4 women). Ninety women that lived in Bransford had an unspecified occupation, which was representative of the time. Today, there are 186 residents in employment. 8 people now work in agriculture, compared to 46 in 1881. Wholesale and retail trade now has the highest level of works in Bransford, with 35 people (18.8% of employment) working in this field. Human health and social work has the second highest level of employment in Bransford with jobs in education being third highest. This shows a huge change from 1881 where the majority of jobs were in agriculture, mining and domestic services.

=== Population and age ===
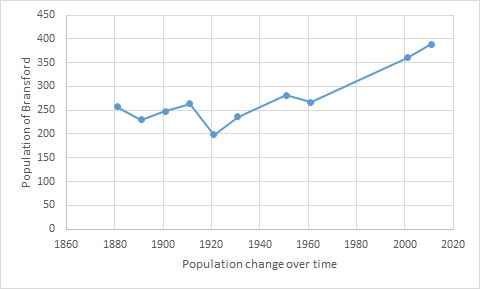
Total Population of Bransford Civil Parish, Worcestershire, as reported by the Census of Population from 1881 to 2011

The population of Bransford has steadily increased since 1881. There was a slight decrease in 1891 but then it continued to increase until 1911. In 1911, the population was at 263 but this then steeply dropped to 198 in 1921. This was most likely due to World War 1 leading to a vast decrease in population. Since 1961, there has been a sharper increase in population, going from 267 to 389 today. There was no census information between 1961 and 2001, so there may have been changes here that were not recorded. Today, the population may be increasing due to a growing population, as well as the growing number of businesses in Bransford. In 1881 there were 129 males and 128 females living in Bransford. This has changed quite drastically today, as there are 266 males and 264 females. Due to this rise in population there was an increase in housing, going from 62 houses in 1881 compared with the 171 households there are in Bransford today.

The mean age in Bransford is 49.4 and the median age is 53. The largest age bracket is 45–59 years old, as 23.9% of people in Bransford are of this age.

== Governance ==
There are three tiers of local government covering Bransford, at parish, district and county level: Leigh and Bransford Parish Council, Malvern Hills District Council, and Worcestershire County Council. The parish council is a grouped parish council, also covering the neighbouring parish of Leigh.

Bransford is part of the West Worcestershire parliamentary constituency. and its current Member of Parliament is Harriett Baldwin, who is a Conservative representative.

== Transport ==
Bransford lies on the A4103 road. It is served by the 417 and 423 bus services and the nearest train station is Worcester Foregate Street. For many, having a car or van is the main method of transport as out of the 171 households, 161 own at least one car or van. The village is home to a petrol fuelling station/car dealership. Bransford's nearest motorway is the M5.

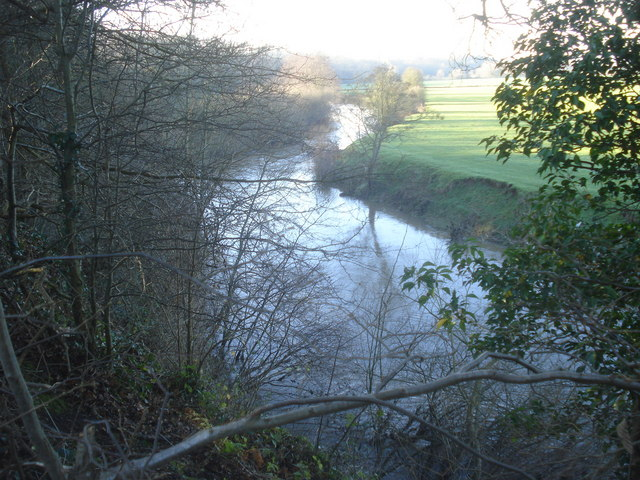
View of River Teme, situated in Bransford
