= Malvern Link railway station =

Railway station in Worcestershire, England

Coordinates: 52°07′31″N 2°19′10″W

Malvern Link
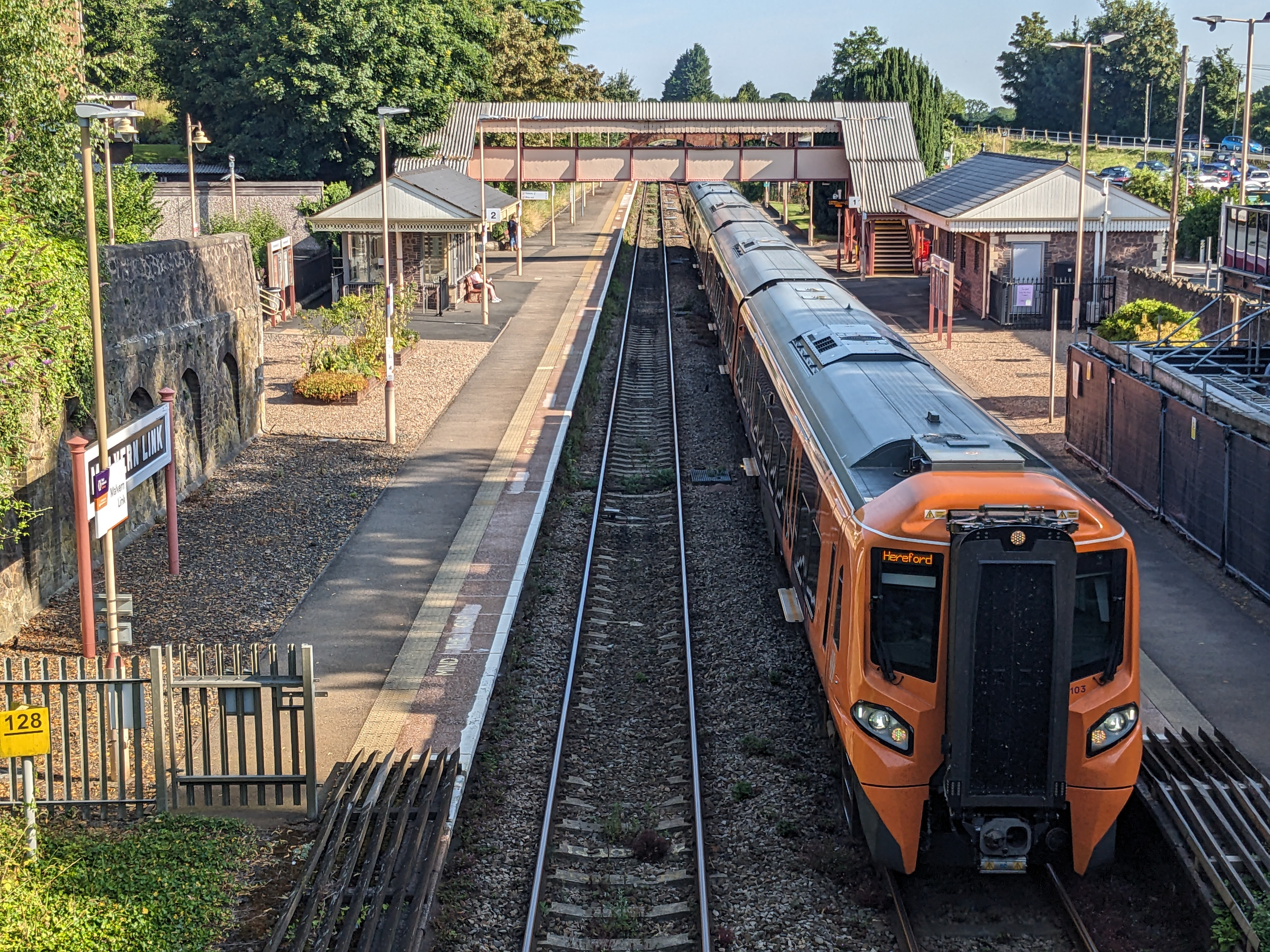

General information
- Location: Malvern Link, Malvern Hills; England
- Grid reference: SO782474
- Manager: West Midlands Railway
- Platforms: 2

Other information
- Station code: MVL
- Classification: DfT category E

Passengers
- 2021/22: ▲0.254 million
- Interchange: ▲14,780
- 2022/23: ▲0.302 million
- Interchange: ▼14,259
- 2023/24: ▲0.318 million
- Interchange: ▼10,334
- 2024/25: ▲0.321 million
- Interchange: ▲14,831
- 2025/26: ▲0.339 million
- Interchange: ▲15,546
Location
Notes
- Passenger statistics from the Office of Rail and Road

Malvern Link railway station serves Malvern Link in Worcestershire, England. It is one of two stations serving the town of Malvern, the other being Great Malvern station.

== History ==
A six-mile (9.7 km) railway from Henwick to Malvern Link opened in July 1859; in May 1860 the line was extended onward to Great Malvern and Malvern Wells.

Most of the original station buildings (on the down (eastern) side) had to be demolished in the 1960s after falling into poor repair, though the station house has survived.

== Development ==
A set of improvements, funded by Worcestershire County Council, Network Rail and the Railway Heritage Trust, was carried out in 2014 to replace the wooden 1960s station building and provide a new entrance to the up platform from Osborne Road. These improvements which cost around £500,000 were designed to harmonise with the heritage architecture of the area and were awarded the Malvern Civic Society's Civic Award in 2015. The remodeling of the station includes a new ticket office, a waiting rooms, and access for pedestrians to and from the nearby Community Hospital.

== Services ==
The station is located on the Cotswold Line and is served by West Midlands Railway and Great Western Railway.

West Midlands Railway run regular services westbound to Great Malvern and Hereford. Hourly services run to Birmingham New Street via Worcester Foregate Street, Bromsgrove and University. Some West Midlands Railway services also serve Worcester Shrub Hill.

Great Western Railway services run hourly services westbound to Great Malvern and Hereford. Hourly services also run to London Paddington via Worcestershire Parkway, Oxford and Reading. One or two services a day instead run to Bristol Temple Meads or Evesham.

| Preceding station | National Rail | Following station |
|---|---|---|
| Great Malvern | West Midlands Railway; Birmingham-Great Malvern/Hereford | Worcester Foregate Street |
| Great Malvern | Great Western Railway; Cotswold Line | Worcester Foregate Street |
| Great Malvern | Great Western Railway; Great Malvern - Bristol | Worcester Foregate Street |
| | Disused railways | |
| Great Malvern; Line and station open | Great Western Railway; Worcester and Hereford Railway | Newland Halt; Line open, station closed |
