= Littleworth, Worcestershire =

Village in Worcestershire, England

Coordinates: 52.149°N 2.170°W

Littleworth
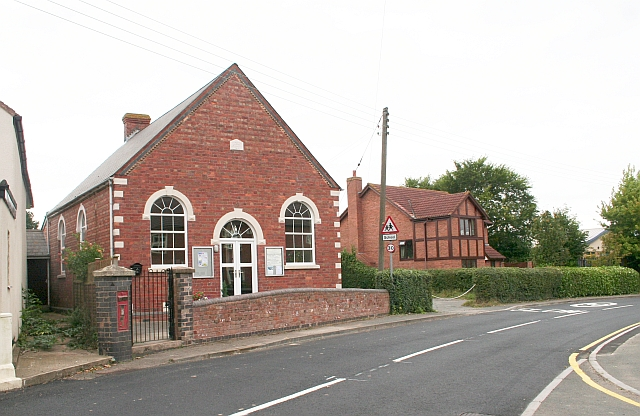
- Littleworth Methodist Chapel

- Location within Worcestershire
- OS grid reference: SO884501
- Civil parish: Norton-juxta-Kempsey
- District: Wychavon
- Shire county: Worcestershire
- Region: West Midlands
- Country: England
- Sovereign state: United Kingdom
- Post town: WORCESTER
- Postcode district: WR5
- Police: West Mercia
- Fire: Hereford and Worcester
- Ambulance: West Midlands
- UK Parliament: Droitwich and Evesham

Littleworth is a medium-sized village on the outskirts of Worcester. It forms the civil parish of Norton-juxta-Kempsey with its adjacent village Norton. Norton-juxta-Kempsey had a population of 2,458 at the 2021 census.

The village is the location of Norton Juxta Kempsey Primary School and the Norton Parish Hall. it is about 5 miles (8 km) southeast of Worcester city centre, and about 2 km by road from Worcestershire Parkway railway station. There is one bus service through the village.
