= Blackpole Halt railway station =

Former railway station in Worcestershire, England

Blackpole Halt

General information
- Location: North of Worcester, Worcestershire; England
- Coordinates: 52.2182°N 2.1990°W
- Grid reference: SO865577
- Platforms: 2

Other information
- Status: Disused

History
- Original company: Great Western Railway
- Post-grouping: Great Western Railway

Key dates
- 1917: Opened
- 1920: Closed
- 1940: Reopened
- 1946: Closed
Location

Blackpole Halt railway station was a station to the north of Worcester, Worcestershire, England.

The station was opened during World War I to serve a nearby munitions factory and closed afterwards, before reopening again between 1940 and 1946 for the same purpose in World War II.

Preceding station	Disused railways	Following station
Fernhill Heath; Line open, station closed	Great Western Railway; Oxford, Worcester and Wolverhampton Railway	Astwood Halt; Line open, station closed
