= Bransford Road railway station =

Former railway station in Worcestershire, England

Bransford Road
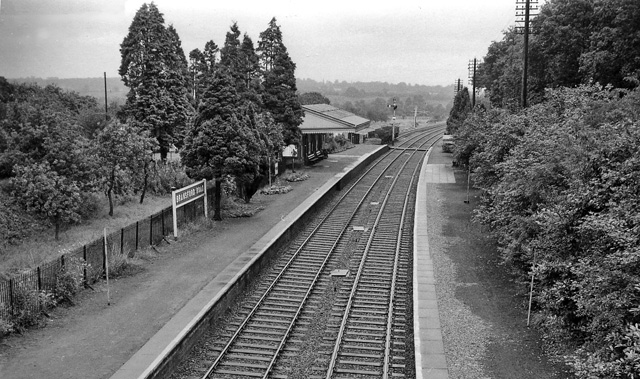
- Bransford Road station in 1963

General information
- Location: Bransford, Worcestershire; England
- Coordinates: 52.1686°N 2.2866°W
- Grid reference: SO804522
- Platforms: 2

Other information
- Status: Disused

History
- Original company: Worcester and Hereford Railway
- Pre-grouping: Great Western Railway
- Post-grouping: Great Western Railway

Key dates
- 1 September 1860: Opened
- 5 April 1965: Closed
Location

Bransford Road railway station was a station in Bransford, Worcestershire, England. The station was opened in 1860 and closed on 5 April 1965. The original station was replaced in 1911 by a standard GWR design with most facilities on the "up" platform.

The goods yard was closed in 1964.

Preceding station	Disused railways	Following station
Newland Halt; Line open, station closed	Great Western Railway; Worcester and Hereford Railway	Rushwick Halt; Line open, station closed
