= Butts Spur Line =

Railway line in the UK

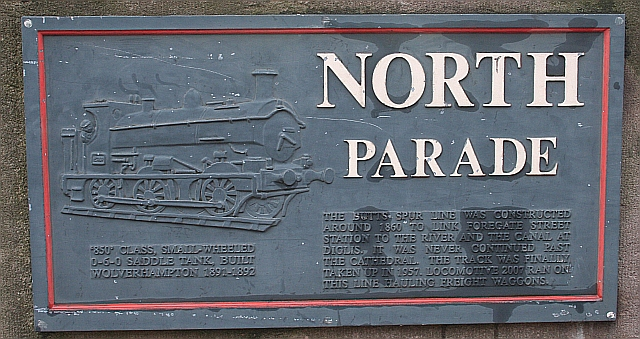
Butts Spur Railway Plaque

== History ==
The Butts Spur was a railway line constructed around 1860 with the aim of linking Worcester Foregate Street railway station to Diglis where the Worcester and Birmingham canal joined the river Severn. From around 1892 the line was worked by a small wheeled 0-6-0 saddle tank locomotive No. 2007 constructed in Wolverhampton.The line was proposed by the Oxford, Worcester and Wolverhampton Railway.

== Route ==
The line descended from Foregate street station on a viaduct to the north side of the Worcester to Hereford rail line into a headshunt where the locomotive would reverse direction. The train continued its journey under the Worcester to Hereford railway viaduct via the east bank of the river Severn under Worcester bridge, at the time referred to as Gwynne's bridge, towards Worcester cathedral.

The line's construction did not achieve its aim of reaching Diglis, instead finishing adjacent to Dent's factory and Stallard's Distillery which at the time were located on South Quay. This was due to Worcester cathedral authorities objecting to a railway running between the cathedral and River Severn.

With the rebuilding of the Worcester road bridge in 1931, the track was truncated to the north side of the bridge. The line was closed and the track removed in 1957.

Traces of the line remain visible in the descending gradient of the viaduct arches which are currently used as commercial and storage units.

== Usage ==
Primarily intended to convey freight, it was hoped that goods arriving at Diglis from the river Severn would be transhipped to the railway. Ultimately, the line was used by Dent's factory and Stallards's distillery located on South Quay and also brought cattle to the cattle market Passengers were also occasionally conveyed for excursions to Worcester Racecourse where the Butts Siding was constructed adjacent to the race course entrance on Pitchcroft.

== Incidents ==
An accident occurred on 6 July 1876 when carriages were being shunted from Worcester Foregate Street station to the Butts Siding adjacent to Worcester racecourse entrance for a returning racegoers excursion.

Possibly due to rain immediately prior to the accident, 13 or 14 carriages were reported to rapidly gain speed as they descended the steep gradient towards the racecourse. The first five carriages destroyed and passed through a substantial brick wall at the end of the line with three of the carriages falling down the embankment into the river Severn. The following four carriages were thrown on to their side and extensively damaged with the remaining 4 or 5 carriages being derailed but only sustaining minor damage. No injuries were reported.
