= Newland Halt railway station =

Former railway station in Worcestershire, England

Newland Halt

General information
- Location: Newland, Worcestershire; England
- Coordinates: 52.1470°N 2.3013°W
- Grid reference: SO794499
- Platforms: 2

Other information
- Status: Disused

History
- Original company: Great Western Railway
- Post-grouping: Great Western Railway

Key dates
- 18 March 1929: Opened
- 5 April 1965: Closed
Location

Newland Halt railway station was a station in Newland, Worcestershire, England. The station was opened on 18 March 1929 and closed on 5 April 1965.

Preceding station	Disused railways	Following station
Malvern Link; Line and station open	Great Western Railway; Worcester and Hereford Railway	Bransford Road; Line open, station closed
