= Droitwich Road railway station =

Disused railway station in Droitwich Spa, Worcestershire

Droitwich Road

General information
- Location: Droitwich Spa, Worcestershire; England
- Coordinates: 52.2632°N 2.1021°W
- Grid reference: SO931627

Other information
- Status: Disused

History
- Original company: Birmingham and Gloucester Railway
- Pre-grouping: Midland Railway

Key dates
- 24 June 1840: Opened as Droitwich
- 10 February 1852: Name changed to Droitwich Road
- 1 October 1855: Closed
Location

Droitwich Road railway station served the town of Droitwich Spa, Worcestershire, England, from 1840 to 1855 on the Birmingham and Gloucester Railway.

== History ==
The station was opened as Droitwich on 24 June 1840 by the Birmingham and Gloucester Railway. Its name was changed to Droitwich Road on 10 February 1852. It closed on 1 October 1855.

Preceding station	Disused railways	Following station
Droitwich Spa	Birmingham and Gloucester Railway	Dodderhill
