= Cutnall Green Halt railway station =

Former railway station in Worcestershire, England

Coordinates: 52.3083°N 2.1915°W

Cutnall Green Halt

General information
- Location: Cutnall Green, Wychavon, Worcestershire; England
- Line: Oxford, Worcester and Wolverhampton Railway
- Platforms: 2

Other information
- Status: Disused

History
- Original company: Great Western Railway
- Post-grouping: Great Western Railway

Key dates
- June 1928: Opened
- 5 April 1965: Closed
Location

Cutnall Green Halt was a railway station in Worcestershire, England, serving the nearby village of Hampton Lovett on the Oxford, Worcester and Wolverhampton Railway between Droitwich Spa and Hartlebury. It was opened in 1928, and closed in 1965. The main use of the halt was by the village schoolchildren, travelling to nearby Droitwich for their education.

Preceding station	Historical railways	Following station
Hartlebury; Line and station open	Great Western Railway; Oxford, Worcester and Wolverhampton Railway	Droitwich Spa; Line and station open
