= Henwick railway station =

Former railway station in Worcestershire, England

Henwick

General information
- Location: Henwick, Worcestershire; England
- Coordinates: 52.1910°N 2.2354°W
- Grid reference: SO840547
- Platforms: 2

Other information
- Status: Disused

History
- Original company: Worcester and Hereford Railway
- Pre-grouping: Great Western Railway
- Post-grouping: Great Western Railway

Key dates
- 25 July 1859: Opened
- 5 April 1965: Closed
Location

Henwick railway station was a station in Henwick, Worcestershire, England. The station was opened on 25 July 1859 and the last train called on 3 April 1965. It served one of the western suburbs of Worcester located the other side of the River Severn in an area that forms part of the wider St John's district. Today the next station west of Worcester Foregate Street is Malvern Link.

Preceding station	Disused railways	Following station
Boughton Halt; Line open, station closed	Great Western Railway; Worcester and Hereford Railway	Worcester Foregate Street; Line and station open
