= A4103 road =

Road in Worcestershire and Herefordshire

Coordinates: 52.11902°N 2.4563°W

A4103

Route information
- Length: 25 mi (40 km)

Major junctions
- East end: Worcester
- A44 A4440 A417 A465; A49 A4110 A480
- East end: Stretton Sugwas

Location
- Country: United Kingdom

Road network
- Roads in the United Kingdom; Motorways; A and B road zones
← A4102	→ A4104

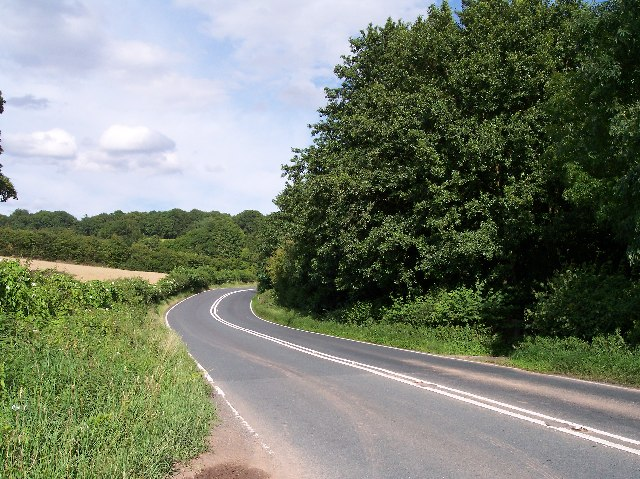
The A4103.

The A4103 is an A-road which runs from Worcester to the A480 in Stretton Sugwas, a village 2 miles (3.2 km) west of Hereford. The road is a primary route as far as the junction with the A465 east of Hereford, and is liable to flooding at Bransford, where it crosses the River Teme.
