= Boughton Halt railway station =

Former railway station in Worcestershire, England

Boughton Halt

General information
- Location: St Johns, Worcester, Worcestershire; England
- Coordinates: 52.1874°N 2.2494°W
- Grid reference: SO830543
- Platforms: 2

Other information
- Status: Disused

History
- Original company: Great Western Railway
- Post-grouping: Great Western Railway

Key dates
- 31 March 1924: Opened
- 5 April 1965: Closed
Location

Boughton Halt railway station was a station in St Johns, Worcester, Worcestershire, England. The station was opened on 31 March 1924 and closed on 5 April 1965.

Preceding station	Disused railways	Following station
Rushwick Halt; Line open, station closed	Great Western Railway; Worcester and Hereford Railway	Henwick; Line open, station closed
