= Fernhill Heath railway station =

Former railway station in Worcestershire, England

Fernhill Heath
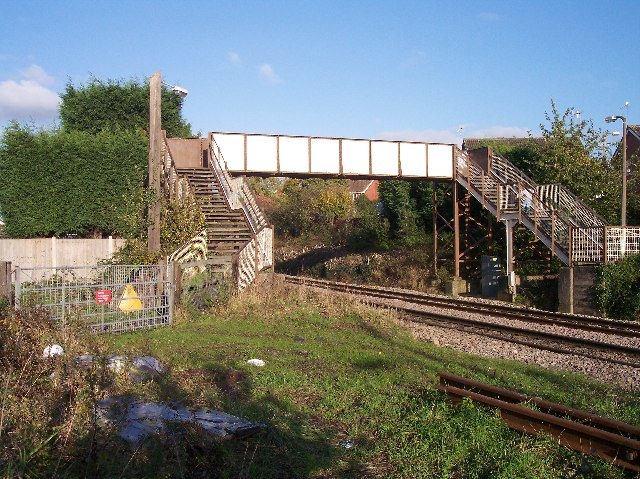
- The site of the former station

General information
- Location: Fernhill Heath, Worcestershire; England
- Coordinates: 52.2315°N 2.1920°W
- Grid reference: SO870592
- Platforms: 2

Other information
- Status: Disused

History
- Original company: Oxford, Worcester and Wolverhampton Railway
- Pre-grouping: Great Western Railway
- Post-grouping: Great Western Railway

Key dates
- 18 February 1852: Opened as Fearnall Heath
- 1 July 1883: Renamed Fernhill Heath
- 5 April 1965: Closed
Location

Fernhill Heath railway station was an intermediate railway station on the Oxford, Worcester and Wolverhampton Railway between Worcester (Tunnel Junction) and Droitwich Spa.

== History ==
The original station was opened by the Oxford, Worcester and Wolverhampton Railway on 18 February 1852; at first named Fearnall Heath, it was renamed Fernhill Heath on 1 July 1883.

The station was closed on 5 April 1965 due to the Beeching cuts, and little remains of the station. The footbridge was added in the early 1970s and was not part of the original station which operated a walk over crossing only.

In 2017, a document by Transport for West Midlands included Fernhill Heath as a 'possible a new station'.

Preceding station	Disused railways	Following station
Droitwich Spa; Station and Line Open	Oxford, Worcester and Wolverhampton Railway; Great Western Railway	Blackpole Halt; Station Closed and Line Open
