= Pershore railway station =

Railway station in Worcestershire, England

Coordinates: 52.130°N 2.072°W

Pershore
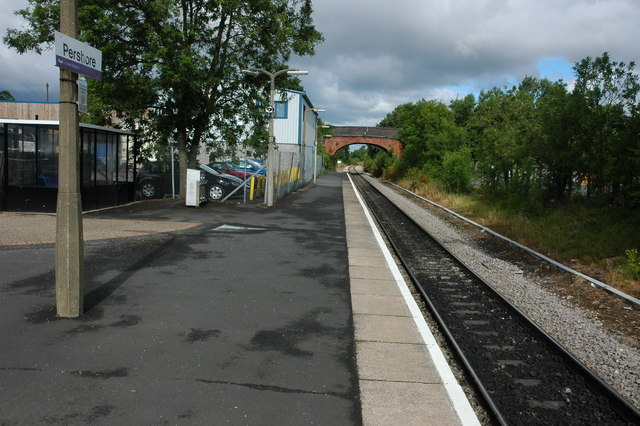

General information
- Location: Pershore and Pinvin, Wychavon; England
- Grid reference: SO951480
- Managed by: Great Western Railway
- Platforms: 1

Other information
- Station code: PSH
- Classification: DfT category F1

Passengers
- 2020/21: ▼37,112
- 2021/22: ▲88,116
- 2022/23: ▲0.104 million
- 2023/24: ▼0.101 million
- 2024/25: ▲0.116 million
Location
Notes
- Passenger statistics from the Office of Rail and Road

Pershore railway station serves both the town of Pershore and village of Pinvin in Worcestershire, England. The station is on a single-track section of the Cotswold Line. The station, and all trains serving it, are operated by Great Western Railway.

== History ==
The station was opened as part of the Oxford, Worcester and Wolverhampton Railway on 1 May 1852.

In 1964, British Rail put forward a plan to close 18 stations on the Stratford-upon-Avon to Worcester, and Oxford to Worcester line, including the station at Pershore, citing an annual loss on these routes of £59,000 (equivalent to £1,040,000 in 2025). There was significant opposition to these proposals.

British Rail put forward a new plan in 1967 to withdraw passenger services between Stratford, Evesham and Worcester, and close Pershore and Honeybourne stations. Demolition had started by January 1968 when Pershore Parish Council complained to Sir Gerald Nabarro. The Minister for Transport, Richard Marsh intervened, and agreed that the station would not close, but would remain open as an unstaffed halt in the interest of dozens of commuters who travelled daily to Worcester. The service to be provided was one train in the morning and another in the evening.

The station is the subject of a poem by John Betjeman called Pershore Station or A Liverish Journey First Class.

== Services ==
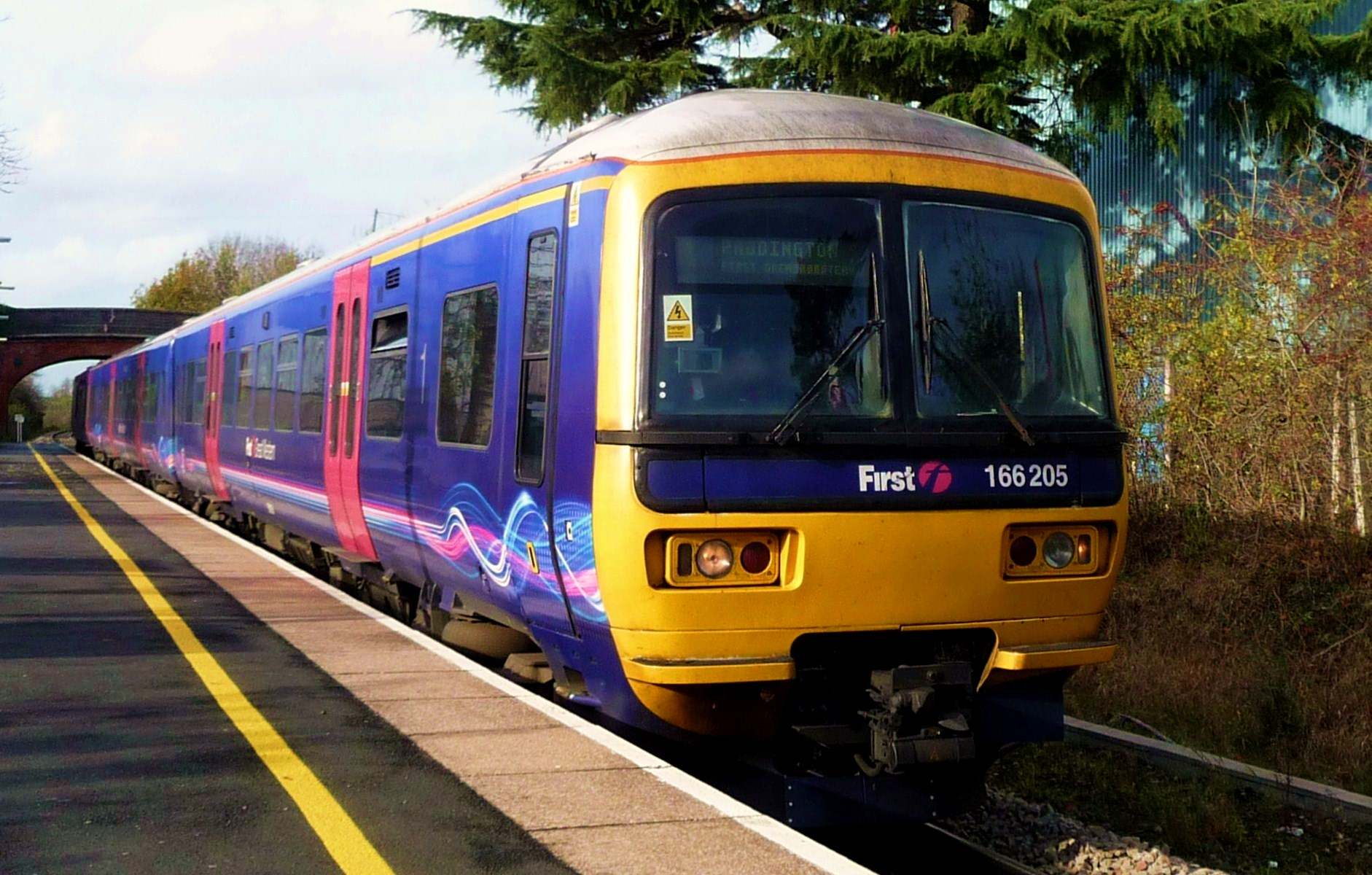
A Class 166 diesel multiple unit 166205 at Pershore, en route to London Paddington

Great Western Railway operate all services at Pershore. The off-peak service in trains per hour is:

- 1 tph to London Paddington
- 1 tph to Worcester Foregate Street; some of which continue to Great Malvern and Hereford.

| Preceding station | National Rail | Following station |
|---|---|---|
| Worcestershire Parkway | Great Western Railway; Cotswold Line | Evesham |
