= Rushwick Halt railway station =

Former railway station in Worcestershire, England

Rushwick Halt
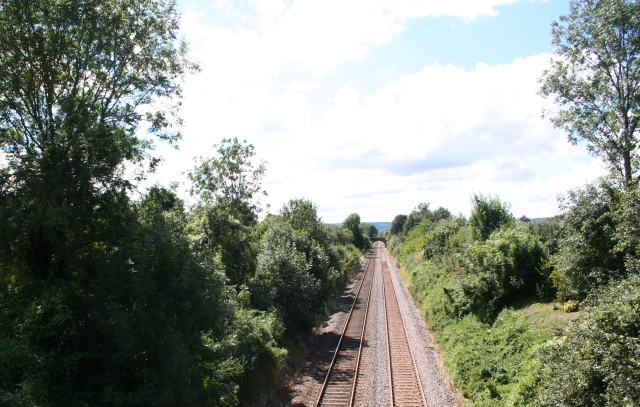
- The site of Rushwick Halt in 2007

General information
- Location: Rushwick, Worcestershire; England
- Coordinates: 52.1829°N 2.2602°W
- Grid reference: SO823538
- Platforms: 2

Other information
- Status: Disused

History
- Original company: Great Western Railway
- Post-grouping: Great Western Railway

Key dates
- 31 March 1924: Opened
- 5 April 1965: Closed
Location

Rushwick Halt railway station was a station in Rushwick, Worcestershire, England. The station was opened on 31 March 1924, and closed on 5 April 1965.

The station is planned to reopen to passengers in 2041, according to Worcestershire Council. It will serve approximately 1,000 homes.

Preceding station	Disused railways	Following station
Leigh Court; Line and station closed	Great Western Railway; Worcester, Bromyard and Leominster Railway	Terminus
Bransford Road; Line open, station closed	Great Western Railway; Worcester and Hereford Railway	Boughton Halt; Line open, station closed
