= Droitwich Spa railway station =

Railway station in Worcestershire, England

Coordinates: 52.268°N 2.158°W

Droitwich Spa
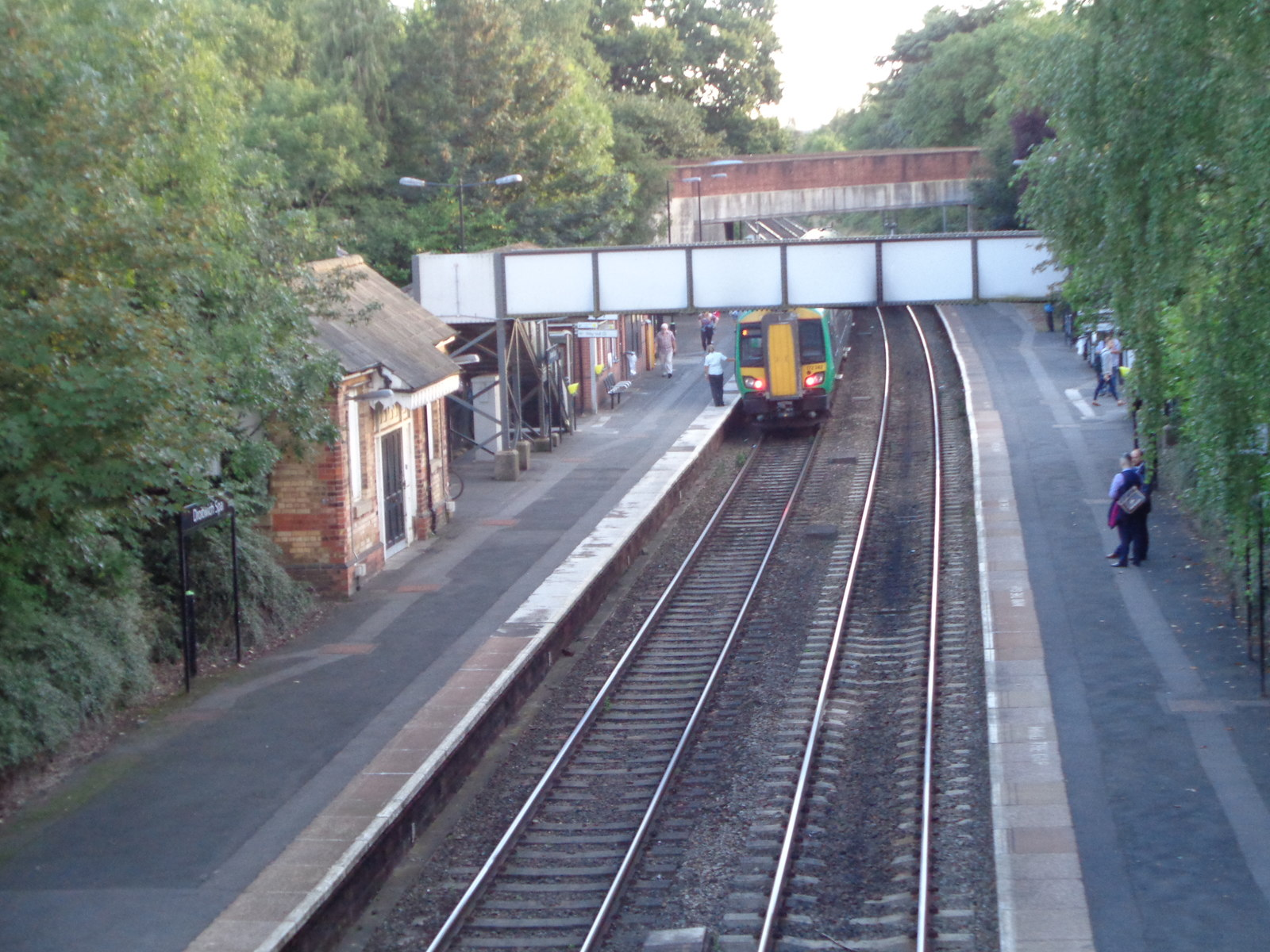

General information
- Location: Droitwich Spa, Wychavon; England
- Grid reference: SO892633
- Manager: West Midlands Railway
- Platforms: 2

Other information
- Station code: DTW
- Classification: DfT category E

History
- Opened: 1852

Passengers
- 2021/22: ▲0.326 million
- Interchange: ▲43,894
- 2022/23: ▲0.397 million
- Interchange: ▼34,666
- 2023/24: ▲0.464 million
- Interchange: ▲48,167
- 2024/25: ▲0.519 million
- Interchange: ▲64,673
- 2025/26: ▲0.581 million
- Interchange: ▲70,853
Location
Notes
- Passenger statistics from the Office of Rail and Road

Droitwich Spa railway station serves the town of Droitwich Spa in Worcestershire, England. It is located just to the south-west of Droitwich Spa Junction of the Worcester to Leamington Spa Line and the Worcester to Birmingham New Street line. The station is managed by West Midlands Trains, who also operate all trains serving it.

== History ==
Droitwich Spa railway station was opened in 1852 (then called simply 'Droitwich') as part of the Oxford-Worcester-Wolverhampton Line by the Oxford, Worcester and Wolverhampton Railway, which was soon to come under the auspices of the Great Western Railway.

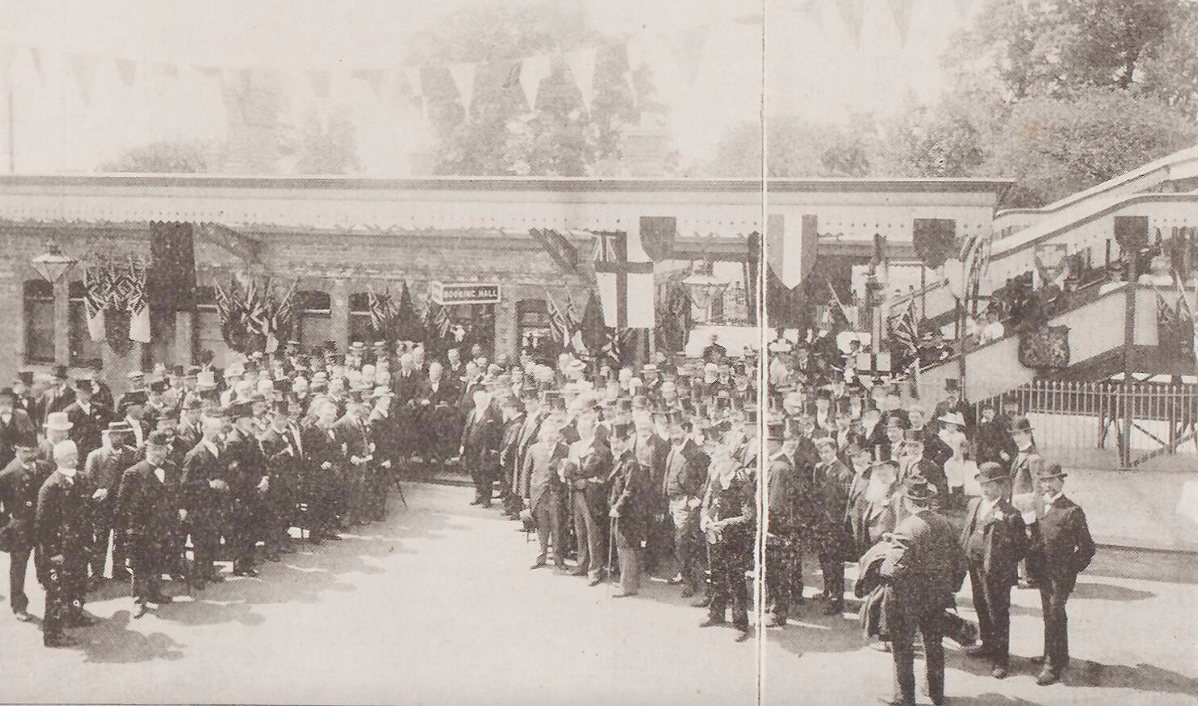
The opening ceremony of the new station in 1899 from the Bromsgrove & Droitwich Messenger 10 June 1899

Plans for a new station began around 1892. The Great Western Railway company put the construction of the new station out to tender in 1897 and the contractor was Mr. Bloxham. It was constructed on land given by John Corbett and the construction cost around £7,000 (equivalent to £780,000 in 2025). The platforms were 500 feet (150 m) long with sheltering verandahs in the station. The new station was opened on 3 June 1899 and this fulfilled the demands of providing accommodation for 200,000 passengers annually using the 16 G.W.R. trains and 12 Midland Railway trains in each direction per day. It was in 1899 that the 'Spa' suffix was added.

The station was linked into the Midland Railway's main line between Birmingham New Street and Gloucester by means of a short branch line to Stoke Works Junction, south of Bromsgrove. This also allowed trains from the Worcester direction to run to New Street (by means of running powers over MR metals) as well as the GWR station at Snow Hill. Originally built as a double line, it was singled in 1969 when Gloucester Power Signal Box took over control of the main line south of Barnt Green.

Before 2012 there was only a limited service (five trains each way) between New St and Worcester/Hereford. However, following the December timetable change on 9 December 2012, London Midland increased the frequency of services to Birmingham New Street to hourly in the afternoon, and bi-hourly in the mornings.

== Droitwich Spa Junction ==
Droitwich Spa Junction is a railway junction located 250 metres (800 ft) north-east of the station.

The junction sees the Birmingham to Worcester via Bromsgrove Line branch off from the main line - the Birmingham to Worcester via Kidderminster Line. Part of this line is a surviving section of the Oxford-Worcester-Wolverhampton Line and is these days used by trains heading towards Kidderminster, Stourbridge Junction and Birmingham Snow Hill. The branch meanwhile joins the main Birmingham to Bristol line at Stoke Works Junction, south of Bromsgrove - services over this line then continue via the famous Lickey Incline en route to Birmingham New Street.

Droitwich Spa signal box controls the junction and is located between the diverging lines. The whole of the junction is controlled by semaphore signals from the British Rail Western Region era. The box interfaces with the West Midlands Signal Control Centre, Stourbridge Desk (at Saltley) on the main line towards Kidderminster and West Midlands Signal Control Centre, Bromsgrove Desk (at Saltley) on the branch, using the Track Circuit Block system - the latter becomes a single line just beyond the junction and remains so until joining the main line at Stoke Works. To the south, the next box is located at Worcester Tunnel Junction, north of Worcester Shrub Hill, signalled via the Absolute Block system.

== Services ==
The service pattern from the station has varied somewhat over the years, particularly after most services via Kidderminster were diverted to New St in 1967 as part of the plans to close Snow Hill (the service via Bromsgrove subsequently becoming peak-hours only). Today though, travellers from the station once again have a choice of stations in Birmingham following the reopening of Snow Hill in 1995 and there are regular services on both routes into the city.

West Midlands Railway serve the station on both routes from Worcester to Birmingham, using the Snow Hill Lines via Kidderminster for services via Moor Street and Snow Hill, and the Cross-City Line after Bromsgrove on New Street bound services.

As of May 2023 the typical weekday off-peak service from the station is:

Birmingham to Worcester via Bromsgrove line:

- 1tph (train per hour) to Birmingham New Street via Bromsgrove and University
- 1tph to Hereford via Worcester Foregate Street and Great Malvern (some services go via Worcester Shrub Hill and either reverse or terminate there)
  - Additional services run at peak times.

Birmingham to Worcester via Kidderminster line:

- 2tph to Worcester (some services go via Worcester Shrub Hill and reverse or terminate there), with 3tph at peak times
- 2tph to Dorridge via Stourbridge Junction, Kidderminster, Smethwick Galton Bridge, Birmingham Snow Hill and Solihull with 1tph extending to Stratford-upon-Avon.
  - 1tph, 3tpd, on weekday evenings (first train departs 19:24, last train departs 21:20) the Stratford services run via Whitlocks End. These are 2tpd Saturday nighttime and 1tph from 09:36 to 17:36 on Sundays.

On Sundays, the Worcester to Stratford via Moor Street service runs every hour, continuing eastbound to Stratford-upon-Avon via Shirley.

On the Birmingham New Street to Hereford route, services to both Birmingham and Worcester remain hourly on Sundays, with two-hourly extensions to all stations south of Worcester.

Services on the Snow Hill line are generally served by Class 172 DMUs and services on the Hereford line are served by Class 196 DMUs.

Preceding station	National Rail	Following station
Hartlebury	West Midlands Railway; Birmingham to Worcester via Kidderminster line	Worcester Foregate Street
Kidderminster	West Midlands Railway; Birmingham to Worcester via Kidderminster line	Worcester Shrub Hill
Bromsgrove	West Midlands Railway; Birmingham to Worcester via Bromsgrove line	Worcester Foregate Street
University	West Midlands Railway; Birmingham to Worcester via Bromsgrove line	Worcester Shrub Hill
Disused railways
Stoke Works	Great Western Railway	Fernhill Heath
Cutnall Green Halt	Great Western Railway; Oxford, Worcester and Wolverhampton Railway	Fernhill Heath
Dunhampstead	Birmingham and Gloucester Railway	Droitwich Road
