= Norton, Worcestershire =

Village in Worcestershire, England

Coordinates: 52.163719°N 2.193146°W

Norton
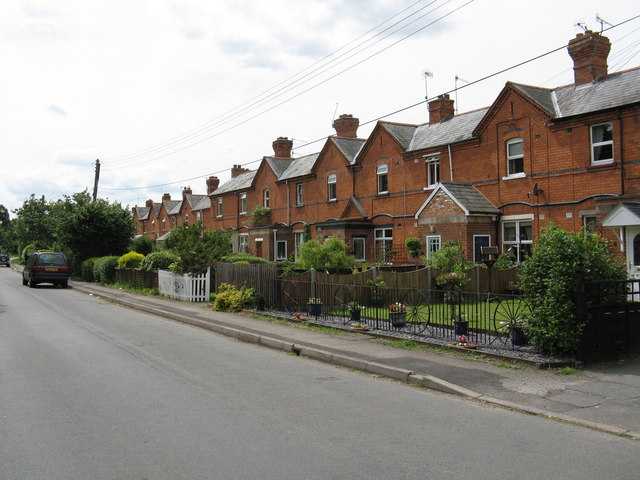
- Broomhall Cottages

- Location within Worcestershire
- OS grid reference: SO868517
- Civil parish: Norton-juxta-Kempsey
- District: Wychavon
- Shire county: Worcestershire
- Region: West Midlands
- Country: England
- Sovereign state: United Kingdom
- Post town: WORCESTER
- Postcode district: WR5
- Dialling code: 01905
- Police: West Mercia
- Fire: Hereford and Worcester
- Ambulance: West Midlands
- UK Parliament: Mid Worcestershire

Norton is a village in the Wychavon district of Worcestershire, 0.8 miles (1.3 km) from the boundary of the City of Worcester, England. The village sits within the Norton-juxta-Kempsey civil parish and is split in two by the M5 motorway, with the original village to the east. Norton-juxta-Kempsey had a population of 2,458 at the 2021 census.

The village saw considerable development in 1990s, mainly centred on the large decommissioned military Norton Barracks, which have been converted into apartments.

The village is the location of St Peter's Garden Centre and Worcester Cricket Club. Worcester Norton Hockey Club also originates from the village, but now play and train at nearby Nunnery Wood High School, Worcester.

== Economy ==
In 1939, Morganite Crucible, a subsidiary of Morgan Crucible, opened its works in the village. In 2010, the site, now closed, was sold for use as an industrial estate, but a Morgan presence remains in the form of Molten Metal Products Ltd, distributors of Morgan products, owned by two ex-Morgan employees, Dave Hill and Jim Ritchie.

A permanent military presence was established in the village with the completion of Norton Barracks in 1877.

== Transport ==
Worcestershire Parkway railway station opened on 23 February 2020. This has a platform on the Birmingham to Bristol line with CrossCountry services which link to Cardiff, Bristol to the south also Birmingham and Nottingham to the north. There is another platform on the Oxford route to Worcester with Great Western Railway services.
