= Henwick =

Suburb of Worcester in Worcestershire, England

Coordinates: 52.193031°N 2.253923°W

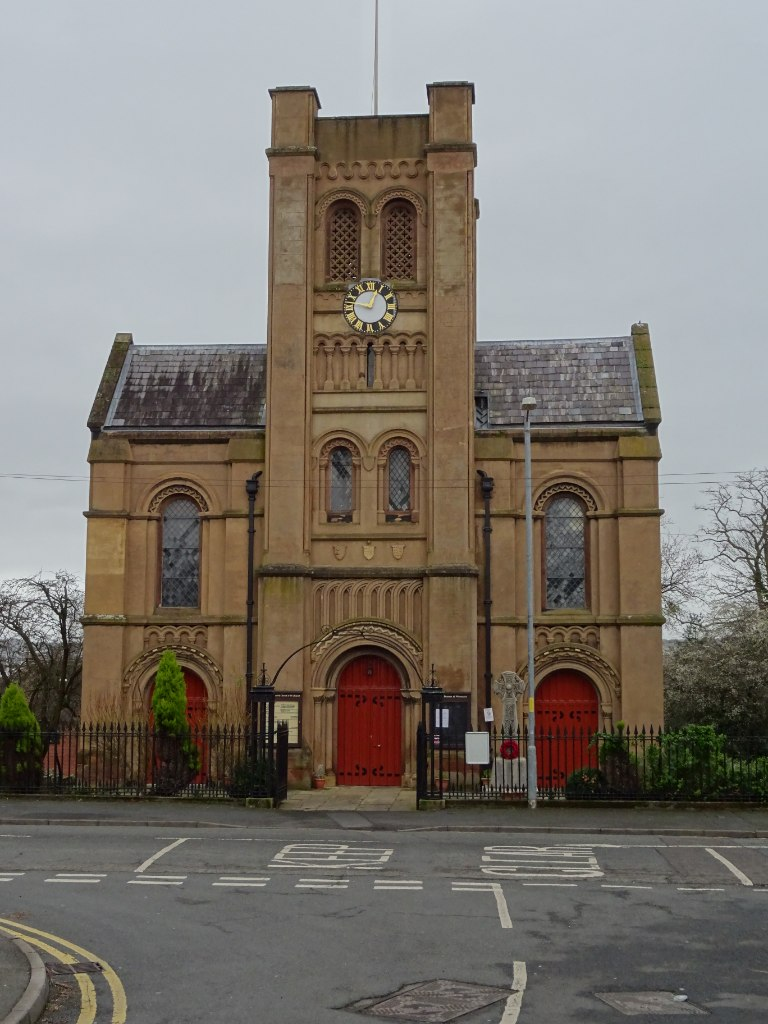
- St Clements Church, Henwick, Worcester

- Location within Worcestershire
  - London: 135 mi (217 km) SE
- District: Worcester
- Shire county: Worcestershire
- Region: West Midlands
- Country: England
- Sovereign state: United Kingdom
- Post town: Worcester
- Postcode district: WR2
- Dialling code: 01905
- Police: West Mercia
- Fire: Hereford and Worcester
- Ambulance: West Midlands
- UK Parliament: Worcester

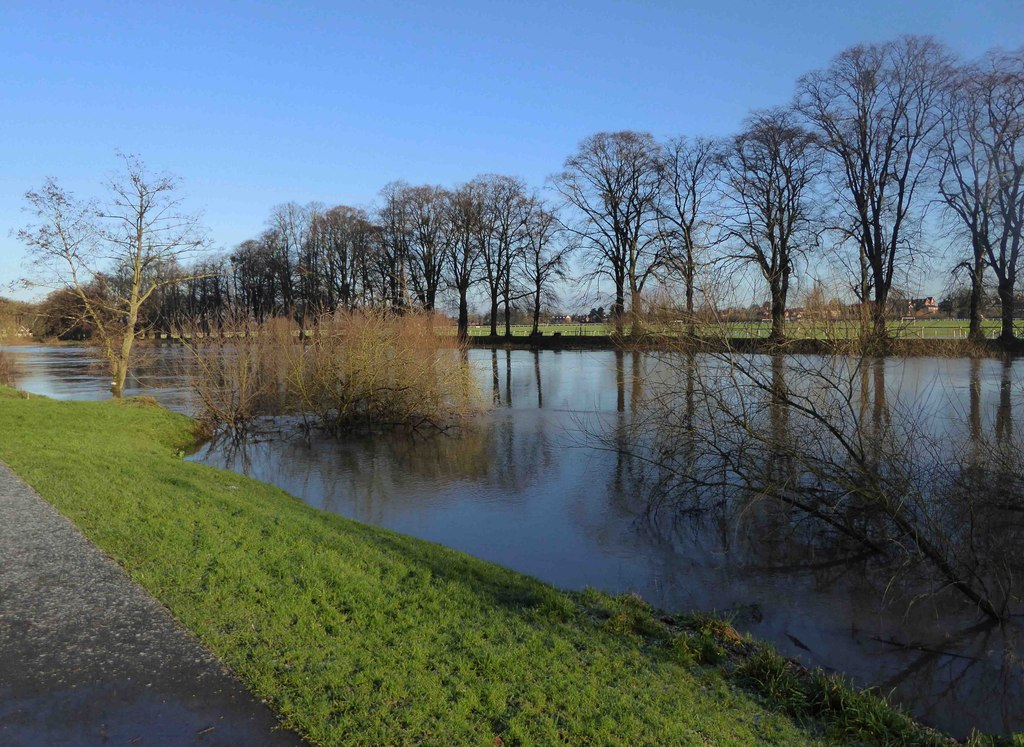
The River Severn in Henwick

Henwick is a western suburb of Worcester in Worcestershire, England. It is located to the west of the city and is separated from it by the River Severn. Henwick is also to the north of St. John's. Henwick was originally a separate village in the then-parish of Hallow (now North Hallow) with St John's Without. It is now a suburb of the city which is unparished. Its population was included under St John's Ward.
