= Worcestershire Parkway railway station =

Railway station in Worcestershire, England

Worcestershire Parkway
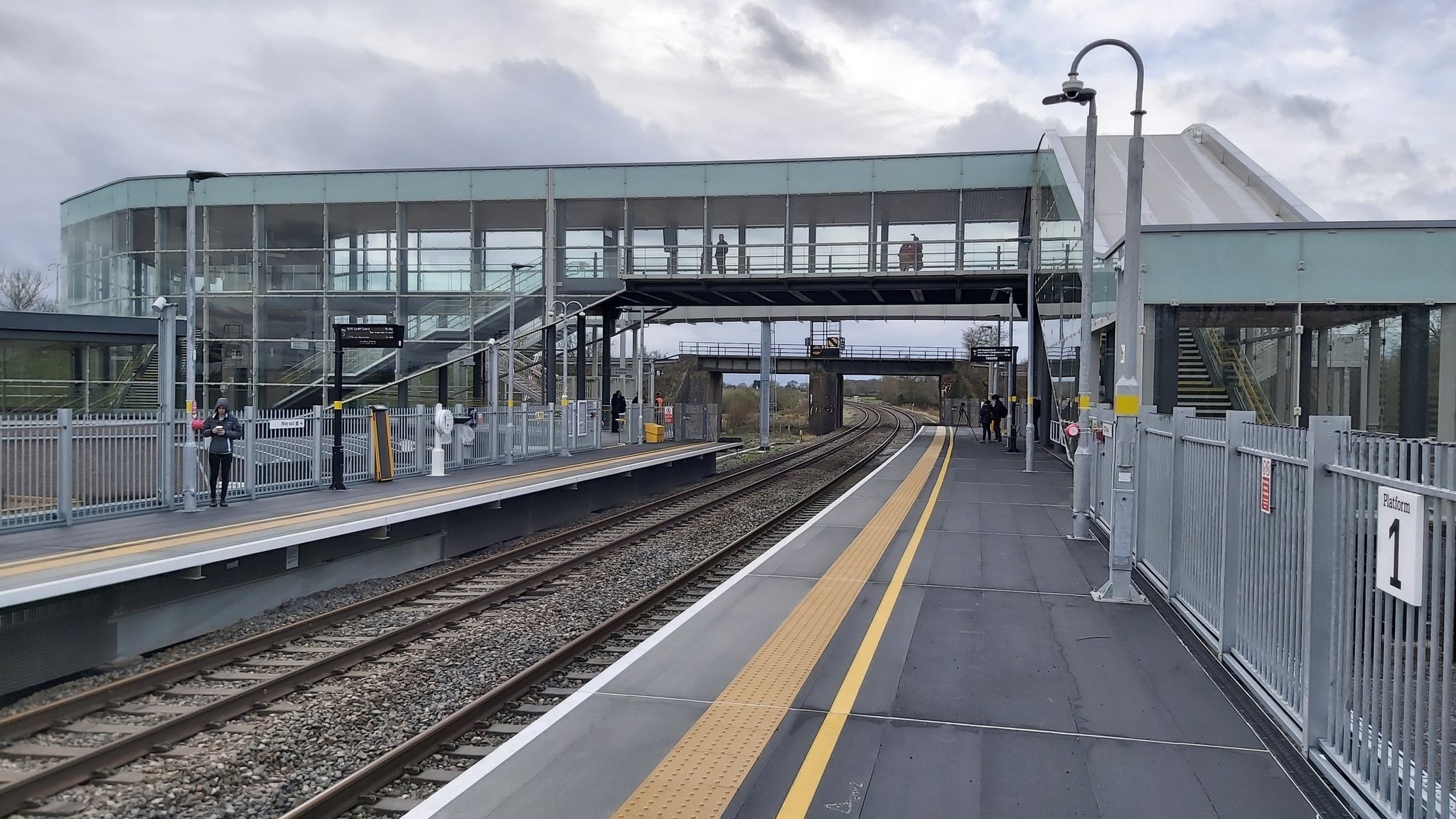
- The Cross Country Route platforms at Worcestershire Parkway

General information
- Location: Norton, Wychavon; England
- Coordinates: 52.1556°N 2.1609°W
- Grid reference: SO890508
- Manager: Great Western Railway
- Platforms: 3

Other information
- Station code: WOP

Key dates
- 23 February 2020: Opened

Passengers
- 2021/22: ▲0.315 million
- Interchange: ▲49,132
- 2022/23: ▲0.335 million
- Interchange: ▲85,405
- 2023/24: ▲0.339 million
- Interchange: ▲0.117 million
- 2024/25: ▲0.456 million
- Interchange: ▲0.134 million
- 2025/26: ▲0.757 million
- Interchange: ▲0.227 million
Location
Notes
- Passenger statistics from the Office of Rail and Road

Worcestershire Parkway is a split-level railway station where the Cotswold and Cross Country lines cross near Norton, Worcester, England. It opened on 23 February 2020.

== Purpose ==
The Cross Country Route from Birmingham to Cardiff, Bristol and the South West passes close to the east of Worcester; however there were no nearby stations on this line, and the CrossCountry trains passed through Worcestershire without stopping. Worcestershire County Council therefore sought for many years to have a station on this line built near Worcester.

The station is positioned a mile outside Worcester near the village of Norton, at the point where the Cross Country line passes under the Cotswold Line from Worcester to Oxford and London. It has two low-level platforms on the former, and one high-level platform on the latter (as it is single-track at this point), allowing interchange between the two lines. It is also close to Junction 7 on the M5, allowing Worcestershire residents to use the station as a 500-car park and ride to major cities, as well as into Worcester's Foregate Street and Shrub Hill stations, which is expected to relieve traffic and parking problems in Worcester itself.

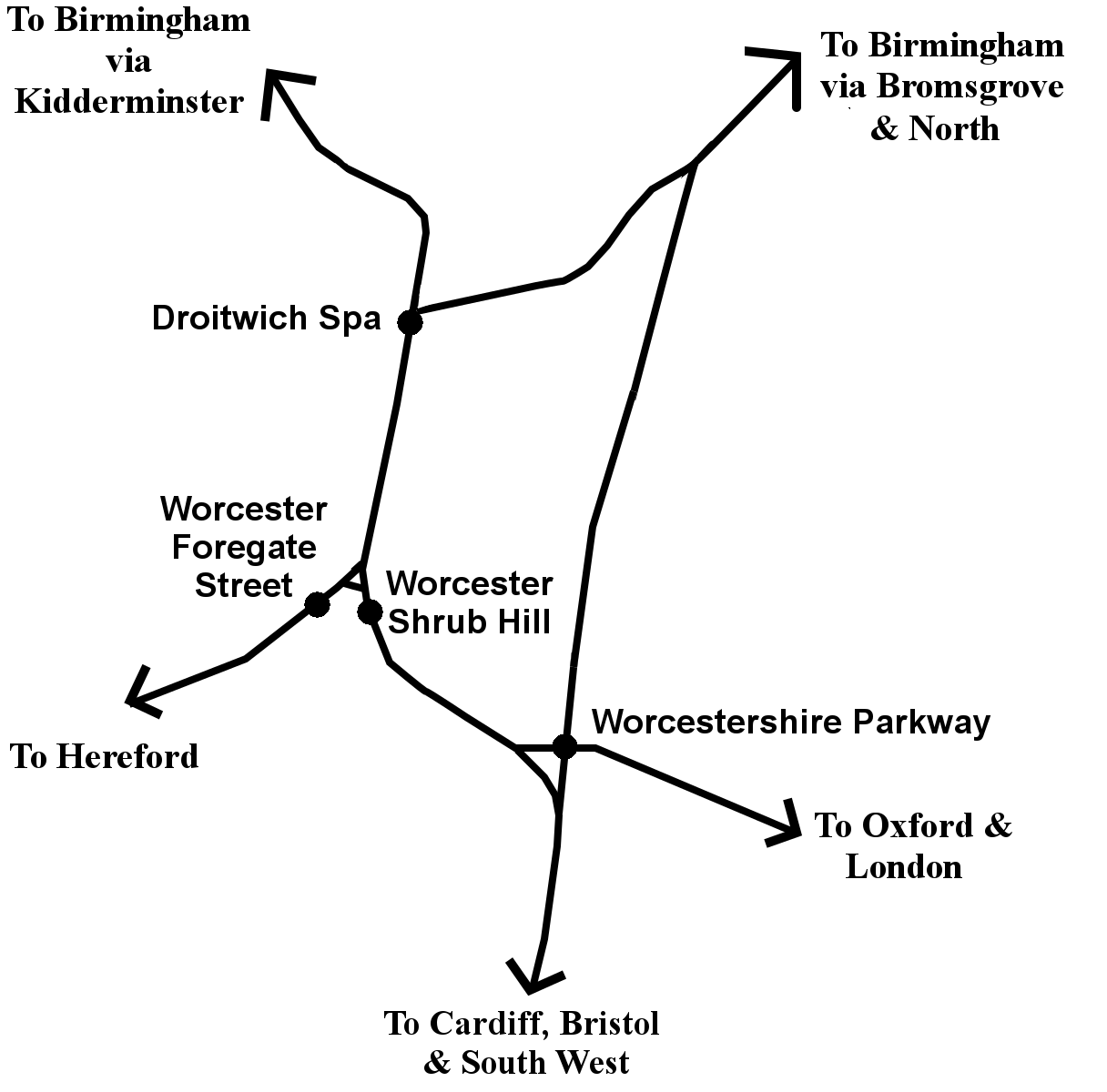
Map of railways around Worcester, showing location of station

Part of the purpose for the station's development is that Worcestershire Parkway will be the focus of strategic development up to 2041. The strategic growth area extends to approximately 1,130 hectares (2790 acres) and is bounded by the M5, A44, the North Cotswold and Birmingham to Bristol mainline railways and Stoulton to the east. It is expected that development around Worcestershire Parkway will deliver up to 10,000 new homes; 50 hectares (123 acres) of employment sites; a new town centre; two secondary schools and seven primary schools and other supporting infrastructure. Health and other community facilities, including for sport and recreation will also be provided. The area will also benefit from the delivery of in excess of 40% green infrastructure which will include a community park and other smaller neighbourhood parks that will contain several LAPs (Local Area for Play), LEAPs (Local Equipped Area for Play) and NEAPs (Neighbourhood Equipped Area for Play). Several neighbourhoods will be planned throughout the site which will be linked to the social and community facilities by a network of safe and convenient pedestrian and cycle paths. The ‘Living Locally’ concept will also be applied which means that everyone will be able to meet their daily needs within a walkable catchment of 20 minutes.

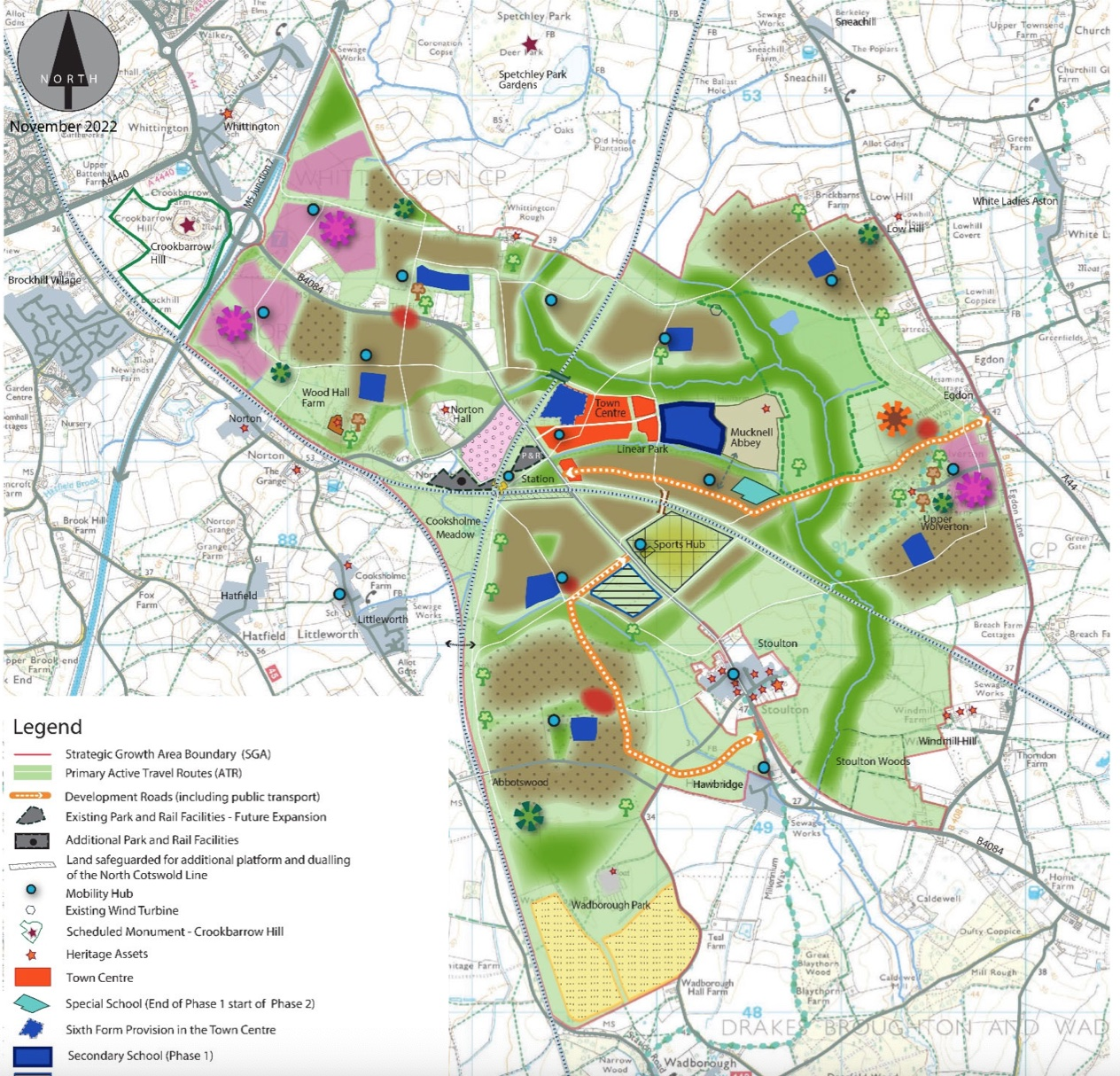
Concept plan for development of wider area

== Development ==
An outline business case was developed by Laing Rail in March 2006, which concluded in favour of the development of Worcestershire Parkway Regional Interchange. Worcestershire County Council set aside £3 million for park and ride facilities at the station in 2007. In October 2008 an e-petition was set up on the No 10 website calling for a Worcestershire Parkway. The Third Worcestershire Local Transport Plan (LTP3) cited Worcestershire Parkway Regional Interchange as the top transport priority for Worcestershire. It was also listed in the West Midlands Regional Spatial Strategy as a Sub Regional Priority, and featured in Policy T6 – Strategic Park and Ride. A revised business case was submitted to the Department for Transport's (DfT) Rail Office, who gave their formal support to the project in 2012.

In July 2014, the station was given funding as part of a government infrastructure fund distributed to local enterprise partnerships.

=== Concerns ===
Concerns were raised that the construction of Worcestershire Parkway would lead to reduced services at Worcester Foregate Street. However, this was rejected in 2014 by the deputy leader of Worcestershire County Council, Councillor Simon Geraghty, who said, "There has been no risk identified by Network Rail to existing railway stations."

=== Construction ===
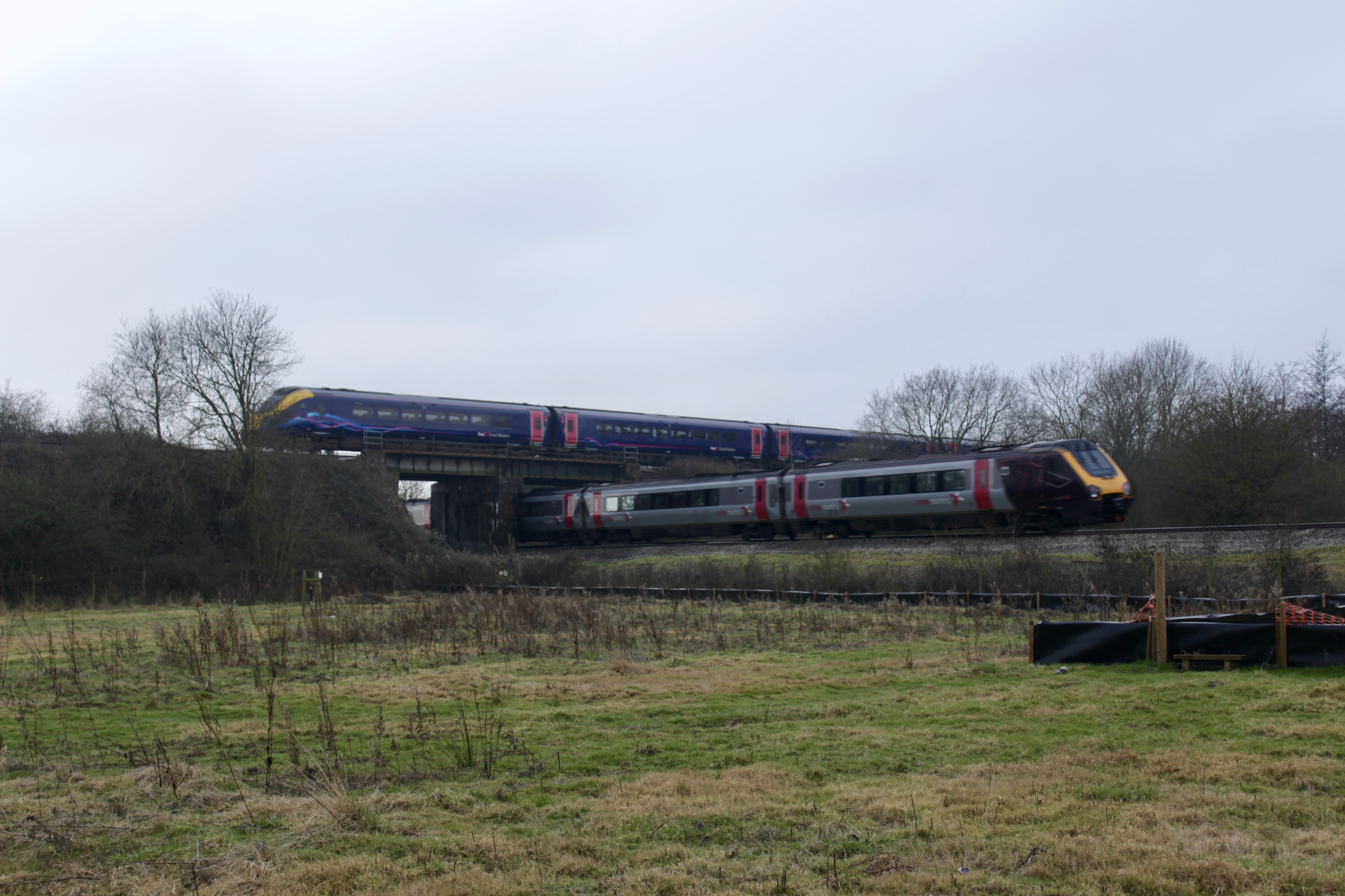
CrossCountry Plymouth-Edinburgh and GWR London services passing the proposed station site in 2017

Artist impressions were released in February 2015 and the council said that a planning application had been submitted, with a decision due to have been made during the summer of 2015. The plan was for work to commence by the spring of 2016 and the station was on track to open in summer 2017.

In February 2015, the council advertised for contractors for the construction of the railway station to include platforms, station building, passenger footbridge and lifts with a commencement date of late September 2015 with completion in May 2017. On 25 August 2015 planning permission was granted, with work expected to start in 2016. The cost of the scheme was estimated at £22 million.

A potential legal battle between Worcestershire County Council and Norton Parkway Developments, who owned the land, started in 2016. Norton Parkway Developments refused to hand over the land to the council as they felt that they were in a position to complete the development themselves.

In January 2017, WCC's plans for Worcestershire Parkway were approved by the DfT. In February 2017, clearance work on the site began, and Worcestershire County Council appointed Buckingham Group Contracting as the developer as part of a design and build deal. Construction work finally began in early 2018, with a planned opening date in 2019. In November 2019, it was announced that the station would open on 15 December 2019. This was later pushed back to an unspecified time "early in the New Year." In January 2020, it was announced that the station would be further delayed but opening was expected 'well before' the May timetable change.

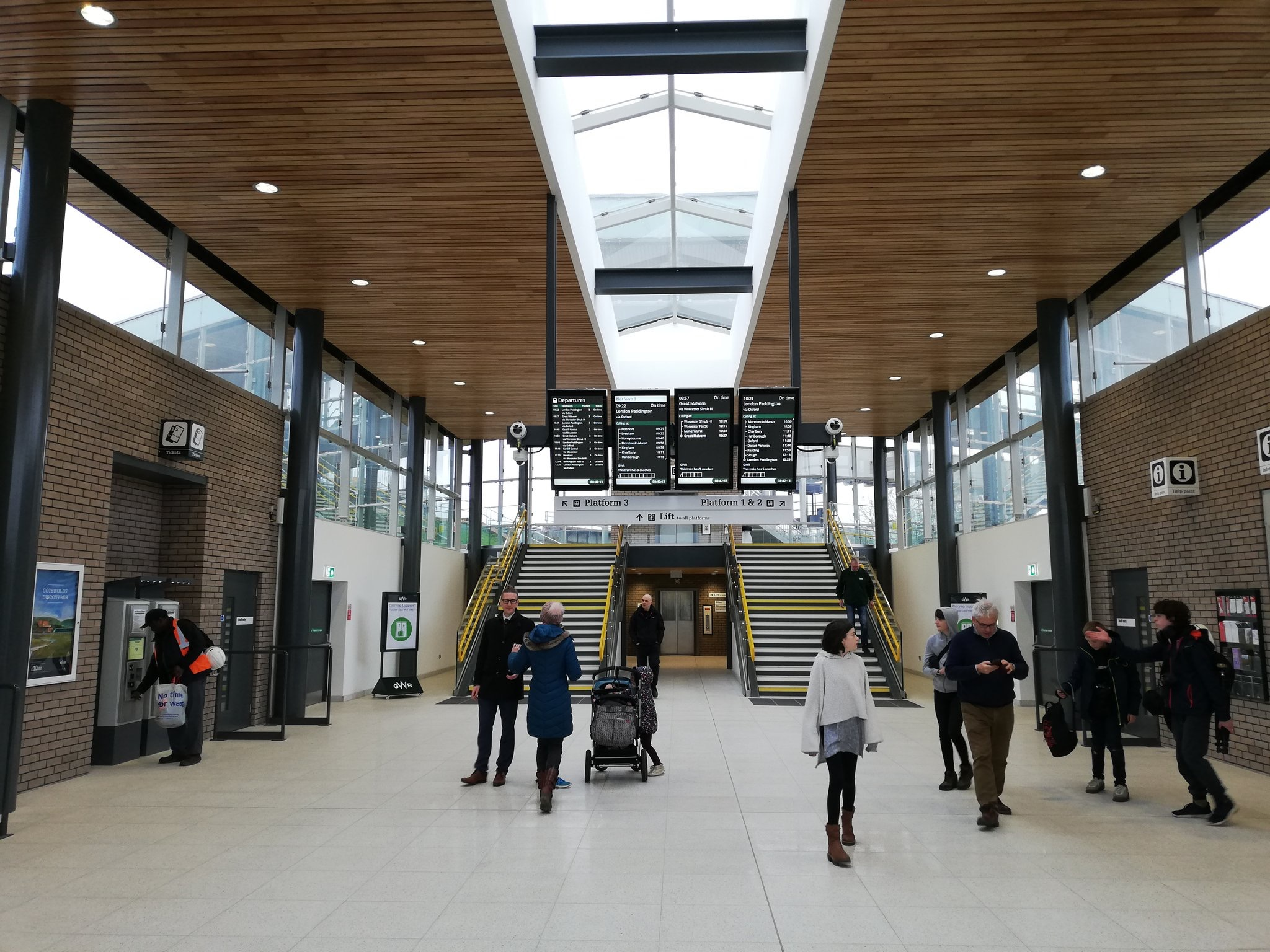
View of station atrium

Phase 1 construction included the Cotswold Line, station building, interchange facilities, 300-space car park, road access and infrastructure for phase 2. This second phase included two new platforms on the Birmingham – Bristol Main Line, a footbridge between the phase 1 and 2 platforms, and an additional 200 car parking spaces.

Worcestershire Parkway opened to the public on Sunday 23 February 2020. The first train to serve the new station was the 08:29 GWR service to London Paddington. At 9:57 the first train arrived from London Paddington. The first Cross Country service to serve the station was the 10:40 to Cardiff Central from Birmingham New Street.

== Response ==
According to Worcestershire County Council, the usage of the station has exceeded expectations with 544,270 journeys made from the station between April 2022 and March 2023, numbers not expected for another 11 years. A plaque was unveiled by Beatrice Grant to mark the occasion.

At a Cabinet meeting of the County Council on 23 November 2023, the Council recognised the station is now being used by over 500 000 passengers a year with associated car park demand which is now around 90% full on mid-weekdays. Demand for the car park at Worcestershire Parkway is subject to ongoing monitoring with patterns of demand emerging. The car park is quieter at weekends than on weekdays, with Tuesday, Wednesday and Thursday showing consistently highest demand. On these days the car park is virtually full. Should the car park become full this is likely to suppress demand and passenger growth, decrease the potential for additional services to call at the rail station or prevent service expansion. Indeed, industry standards suggest that suppression of demand may occur when a car park consistently reaches or exceeds 80% of capacity as motorists become concerned that they might not be able to find a space and seek alternative stations or modes of travel. Therefore, the council are exploring the option of car park expansion at Worcestershire Parkway which is considered integral to enabling the further development and expansion of the rail offer. The potential need for this was acknowledged in the original business plan and the grant of planning permission for the station.

== Services ==
The station is served by both Worcester–Oxford/London and all Nottingham–Cardiff trains, it is also served by (Monday–Saturday) northbound Plymouth–Edinburgh and southbound Manchester–Bristol trains. The aim is for trains to travel to London in 2 hours or less.

Phase 3 of the station's introduction will schedule additional CrossCountry trains.

Services at Worcestershire Parkway are operated by CrossCountry and Great Western Railway. The current off-peak service at the station in trains per hour (tph) is:

- Great Western Railway:
  - 1 tph to London Paddington via Oxford
  - 1 tph to Worcester Shrub Hill with some continuing to Worcester Foregate Street, Great Malvern and Hereford
- CrossCountry:
  - 1 tph to Cardiff Central via Gloucester
  - 1 tph to Nottingham via Birmingham New Street
  - 1 tph to Edinburgh via Birmingham New Street
  - 1 tph to Bristol Temple Meads via Cheltenham Spa – two trains per day continue further to Paignton via Exeter St Davids
  - On Sundays the CrossCountry service is reduced to just the Cardiff–Nottingham route

Preceding station	National Rail	Following station
Cheltenham Spa	CrossCountry; Cross Country Route	University or Birmingham New Street
Ashchurch for Tewkesbury	CrossCountry; Cross Country Route	University or Birmingham New Street
Worcester Shrub Hill	Great Western Railway; Hereford – London Paddington	Pershore or Evesham

== See also ==
- List of railway stations in Worcestershire
- Worcester Foregate Street railway station – the city centre station
- Worcester Shrub Hill railway station – the city interchange station
- The Cotswold Line
- The Cross Country Route
