= Worcester Shrub Hill railway station =

Railway station in Worcestershire, England

Worcester Shrub Hill
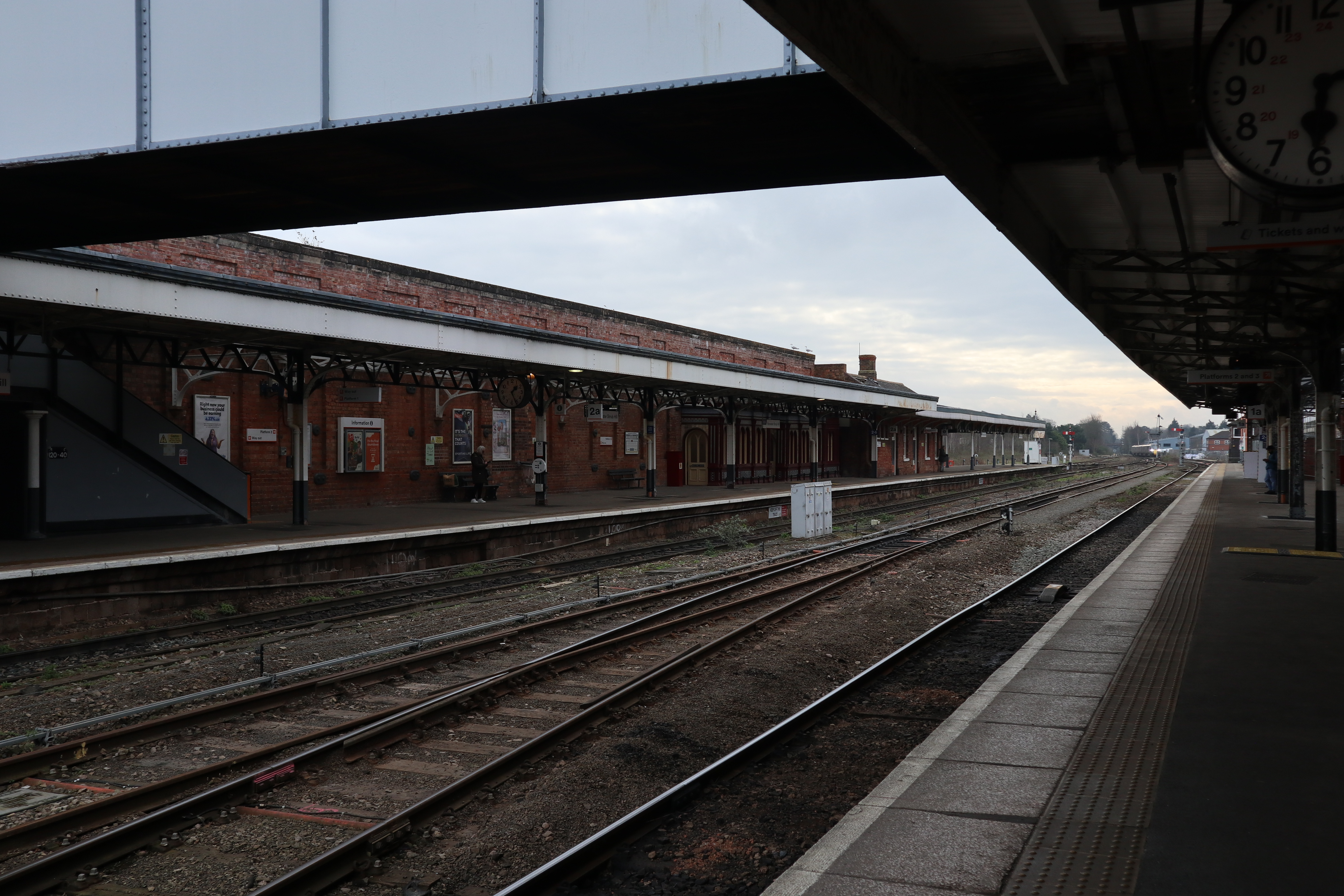

General information
- Location: Worcester, City of Worcester; England
- Coordinates: 52.195°N 2.209°W
- Grid reference: SO858551
- Manager: West Midlands Railway
- Platforms: 3

Other information
- Station code: WOS
- Classification: DfT category C1

History
- Original company: Oxford, Worcester and Wolverhampton Railway/Midland Railway joint
- Pre-grouping: Great Western Railway/Midland Railway joint
- Post-grouping: Great Western Railway/London, Midland and Scottish Railway joint

Key dates
- 5 October 1850: Station opened

Passengers
- 2021/22: ▲0.410 million
- Interchange: ▲0.176 million
- 2022/23: ▲0.477 million
- Interchange: ▼0.143 million
- 2023/24: ▲0.527 million
- Interchange: ▼97,090
- 2024/25: ▲0.577 million
- Interchange: ▲0.123 million
- 2025/26: ▼0.535 million
- Interchange: ▲0.136 million
Location
Notes
- Passenger statistics from the Office of Rail and Road

Worcester Shrub Hill is one of two railway stations serving the city of Worcester, England; the other is Worcester Foregate Street in the city centre. A third, Worcestershire Parkway, is located just outside the city to the south-east. The station is managed by West Midlands Trains, operating here under the West Midlands Railway brand, and is also served by Great Western Railway.

== History ==
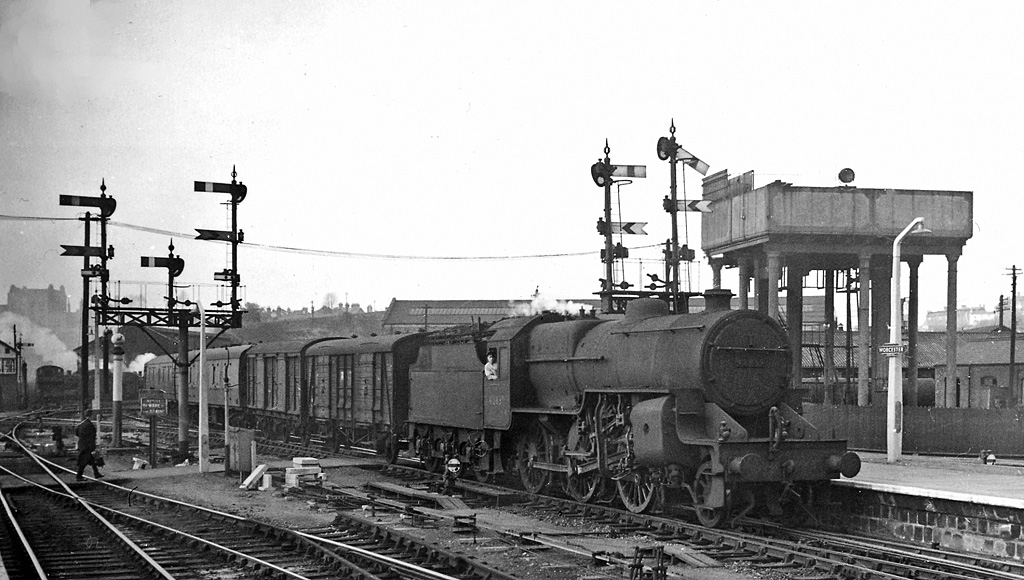
Up Midland parcels train in 1959

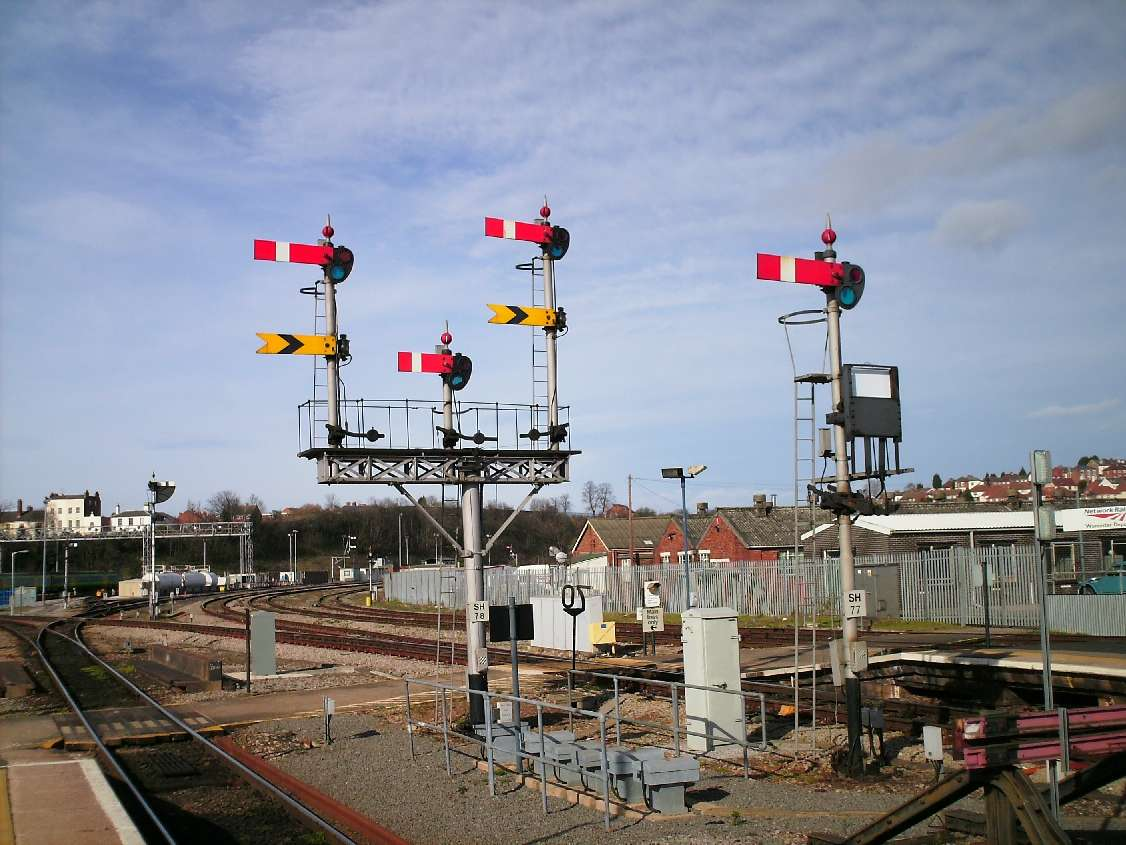
Signals SH77 and SH78 are two examples of the Western Region's semaphore signals from British Rail days

The first station at Shrub Hill was opened in 1850. It was owned jointly by the Oxford, Worcester and Wolverhampton and Midland Railways; until 1852 it was used only as a terminus for the latter's services from Birmingham. The present station building was designed by Edward Wilson and built in 1865. It is a Georgian-style building mainly of engineering brick with stone facings. A key feature is the Grade II* waiting room see below. Originally there was also a train shed which was removed circa 1936.

The cast-iron railings on the station staircases remain hidden by boarding. A surviving feature at the station are the Western Region semaphore signals and the almost unique large round main aspect banjo signal located half-way along platform 1.

The London Midland service between Shrub Hill and Gloucester, via Ashchurch for Tewkesbury and Cheltenham Spa, to complement the two-hourly Great Western Railway service was discontinued at the start of the December 2009 railway timetable, due to low passenger usage.

The station entrance canopy is Grade II listed but its condition has deteriorated.

== Railway operations ==
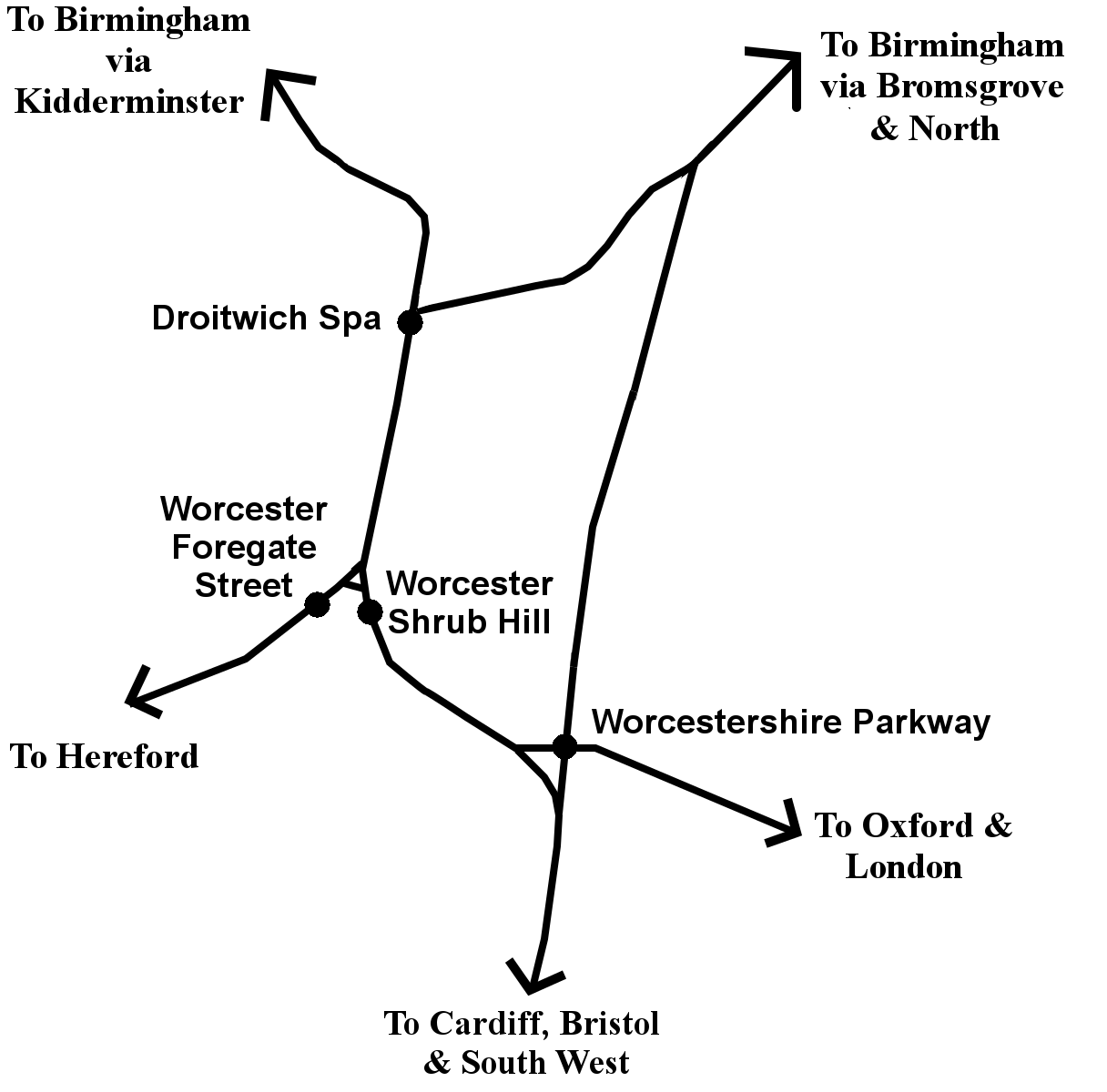
Map of railways around Worcester

The station is controlled by Worcester Shrub Hill Signal Box, located at the London (south) end of platform 1. The Worcester area is controlled by another two signal boxes at Henwick (west of Foregate Street) and Tunnel Junction (to the north of Shrub Hill).

Both platforms 1 and 2 can be used in either direction; generally, trains for Foregate Street use platform one and trains towards Oxford and Cheltenham Spa use platform 2. Platform 3 is a small bay that was used mainly for the former Wessex Trains/Wales & West service towards Cheltenham Spa, as it is a small south facing bay platform its use is limited. Trains leaving Shrub Hill for Foregate Street join a single line that ends near Henwick signal box south of Foregate Street station; this is one of the two single lines through Foregate Street station.

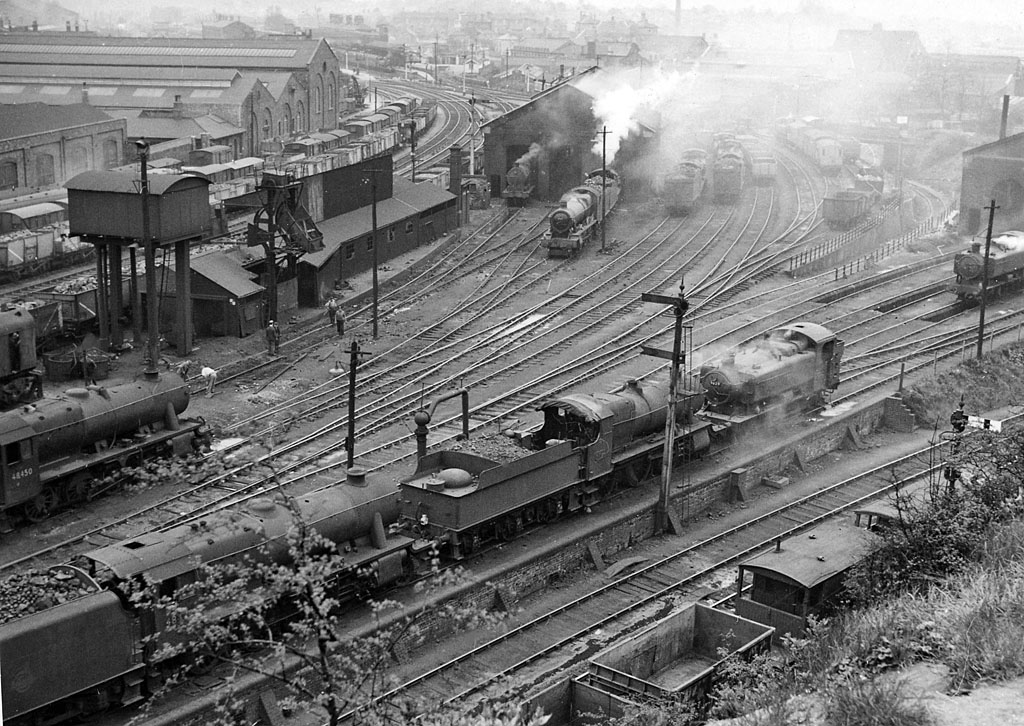
Worcester Locomotive Depot in 1959

Near to the station is Worcester Traincare depot, which is currently operated by West Midlands Trains; it also stables trains at various locations around the station. Great Western Railway also stable some of their diesel multiple units here. The station is home to West Midlands Trains and Great Western Railway's train crew depots. There is also a goods yard, to the north of the station behind platform 2 and 3.

== Services ==
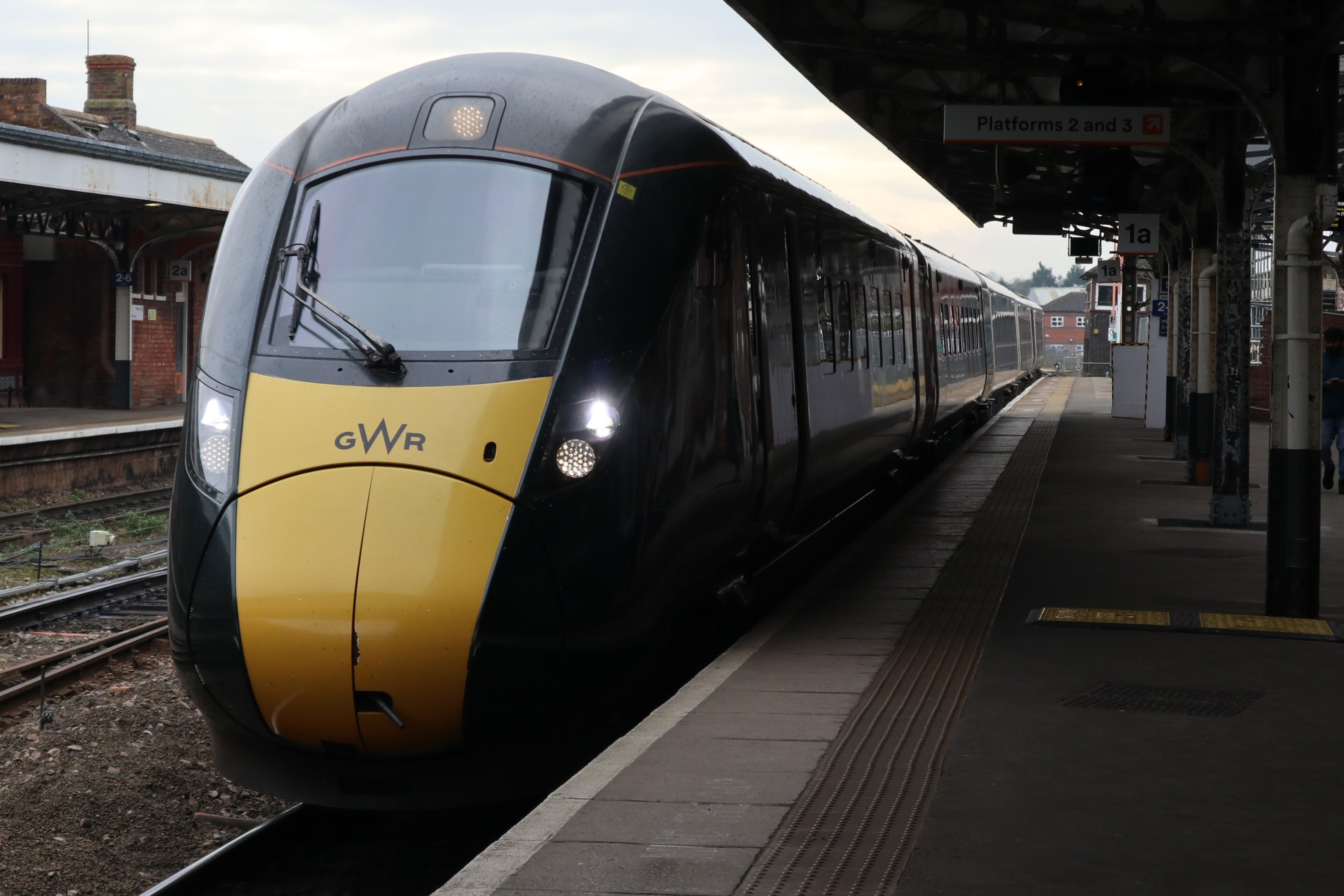
A GWR Class 800 arrives at the station, on a service to Great Malvern in March 2024

Worcester Shrub Hill is served by two train operating companies:

- West Midlands Trains operates routes from Worcester to Birmingham, via Kidderminster and Stourbridge Junction. Trains run to Birmingham Snow Hill and Birmingham Moor Street on the via Kidderminster route, with many of the services on it continuing through to either Stratford-upon-Avon or Dorridge. There are also a limited number of trains via Bromsgrove to Birmingham New Street that start or terminate or call here, mainly at peak times or in the early morning/late evening on the Birmingham to Worcester via Bromsgrove line. Most through services between Hereford and New Street otherwise take the direct route between Foregate Street and Droitwich Spa to avoid the need for a reversal.
- Great Western Railway operates an hourly service to and from London Paddington; the majority of these are via the Cotswold Line and Oxford. Other services to and from London operate via Cheltenham Spa, the Gloucester/Swindon line (Golden Valley Line) and the Great Western Main Line via Didcot and Reading. GWR runs services southwards every two hours to Bristol Temple Meads, via Cheltenham and Gloucester, which then mostly continue to either Weymouth or Southampton Central via Westbury. It also run services to Great Malvern and Hereford, via Foregate Street, from Oxford and London.

Being the bigger of the two stations in Worcester, due to its sidings, Worcester Shrub Hill is often used as stabling point for goods trains and locomotives, as well as an overnight stop for some Great Western Railway rolling stock.

Preceding station	National Rail	Following station
Terminus	West Midlands Railway; Worcester Shrub Hill/Hereford/Great Malvern–Birmingham	Droitwich Spa
Worcester Foregate Street	West Midlands Railway; Worcester Shrub Hill/Hereford/Great Malvern–Birmingham	Droitwich Spa
Worcester Foregate Street	West Midlands Railway; Worcester–Birmingham via Kidderminster	Droitwich Spa
Worcester Foregate Street	West Midlands Railway; Hereford/Great Malvern–Shrub Hill	Terminus
Worcester Foregate Street	Great Western Railway; Cotswold Line	Worcestershire Parkway
Worcester Foregate Street	Great Western Railway; Worcester–Bristol	Ashchurch for Tewkesbury

== Waiting room ==
On platform 2a is the former ladies' waiting room which extends onto the platform. It is a cast-iron frame cast at the Vulcan Iron Works at Worcester. This was a subsidiary of the MacKenzie and Holland signal manufacturing company, located about 200 yards from the station. The exterior is decorated with classical pilasters and covered with majolica ceramic tiles made by Maw and Company of Broseley.

Maw was originally a Worcester-based company, founded in 1850 when they bought the old Chamberlain tile factory; however, in 1852, they moved to Broseley to be nearer their source of clay. In the main, they made encaustic tiles rather than the majolica ceramic tiles used to decorate the waiting room.

In 1873, Wojtczak writes that there was a "Ladies' waiting room attendant called Mrs Dale who earned 10s and that this was the same rate of pay as a Mrs Spencer who was the office cleaner."

It is Grade II* listed and English Heritage placed it on the Buildings at Risk Register in 2003. The official records record that the waiting room was added c1880. In 2005, the register records "The cast iron frame is in need of structural repair. The front wall is leaning out and currently shored up. Preliminary investigative work has been carried out, but repair works were delayed due partly to problem of locating specialist contractors." In April 2005, Network Rail applied for listed building planning consent to restore the waiting room to bring it back into use before the end of 2006. The application gave detail of the work to be carried out, including restoration of the cast-iron work and the sourcing and replacement of the missing ceramic tiles. English Heritage included the waiting room on the 2006 Buildings at Risk Register. Subsequently, restoration work was undertaken and the refurbishment was completed in 2015.

== Bibliography ==
- Biddle, Gordon (2003). Britain's Historic Railway Buildings. Oxford University Press. ISBN 0-19-866247-5.
- Boynton, John & Widdowson, Stephen (2000). Worcester Shrub Hill 150, 1850-2000. Worcester 150. ISBN 0-9522248-8-7.
