= Worcester Foregate Street railway station =

Railway station in Worcestershire, England

Coordinates: 52.195°N 2.222°W

Worcester Foregate Street
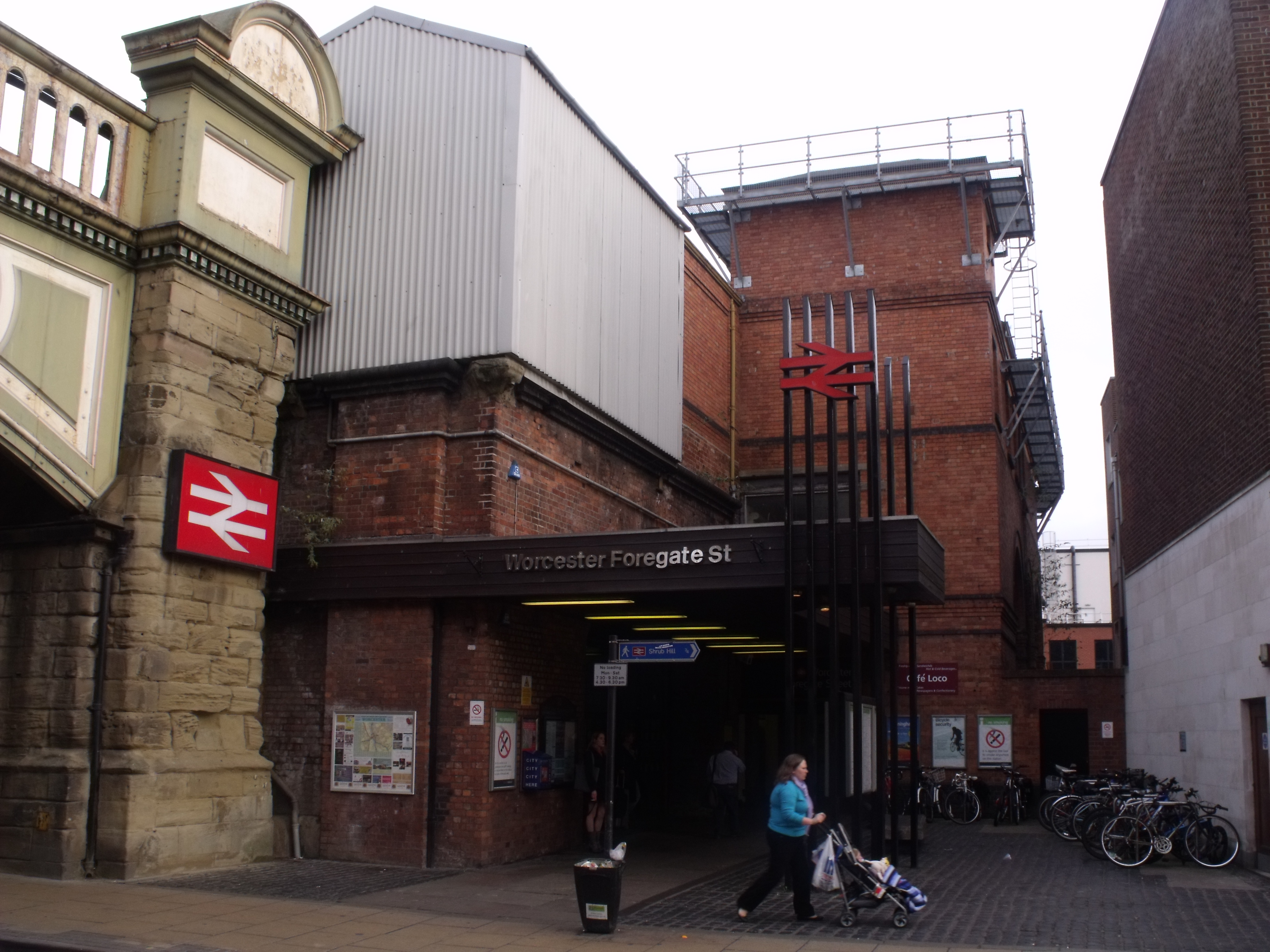
- One of the station entrances.

General information
- Location: Worcester, City of Worcester; England
- Grid reference: SO849552
- Manager: West Midlands Railway
- Platforms: 2

Other information
- Station code: WOF
- Classification: DfT category C2

Passengers
- 2021/22: ▲1.358 million
- Interchange: ▲0.256 million
- 2022/23: ▲1.583 million
- Interchange: ▲0.460 million
- 2023/24: ▲1.748 million
- Interchange: ▼0.134 million
- 2024/25: ▲1.914 million
- Interchange: ▲0.170 million
- 2025/26: ▲2.193 million
- Interchange: ▲0.288 million
Location
Notes
- Passenger statistics from the Office of Rail and Road

Worcester Foregate Street, opened by the Great Western Railway in 1860, is one of two railway stations that serve the city of Worcester, England; the other is Worcester Shrub Hill, which is located to the east. A third station, Worcestershire Parkway, is sited just outside of the city to the south-east. The station is managed by West Midlands Railway, who also operate services along with Great Western Railway.

== History ==
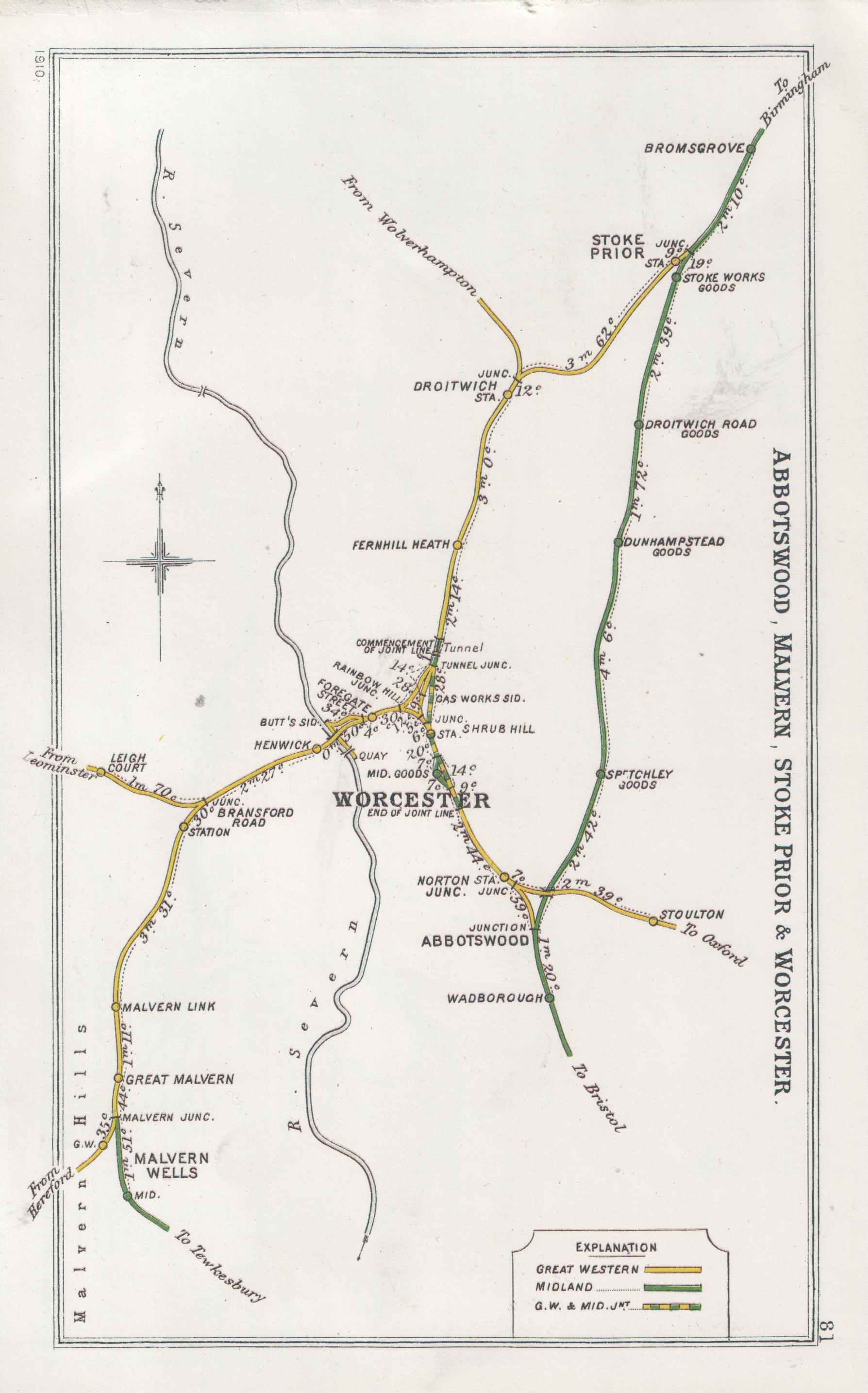
A 1910 Railway Clearing House Junction Diagram showing railways in Worcester

The station opened on 17 May 1860. It was originally part of the Hereford and Worcester Railway which was incorporated into the West Midland Railway, before being absorbed by the Great Western Railway. On 1 January 1948, the company became Government owned under British Railways. The Butts Spur line was also constructed in 1860 with the unfulfilled aim of connecting the station to Diglis for the conveyance of freight.

Since 1973, the station has had an unusual layout; it is essentially two single-track lines side by side rather than the ordinary double-track layout which it appears to be. The two single lines run from Henwick, on the other side of the River Severn, through Foregate Street, to the site of the former Rainbow Hill Junction to the east of the station, which used to provide a crossover between the two tracks. At this point, the lines diverge with that on the north side heading towards Tunnel Junction and Droitwich Spa, while the southern track leads to Worcester Shrub Hill. Rainbow Hill Junction was removed when the signalling in the area was remodelled in 1973.

The station celebrated its 150th birthday on 23 May 2010, with the unveiling of a plaque and a special train, which celebrated its 150th anniversary on the same date. that ran to Great Malvern

The art gallery movement opened on platform 2 on 2 October 2010.

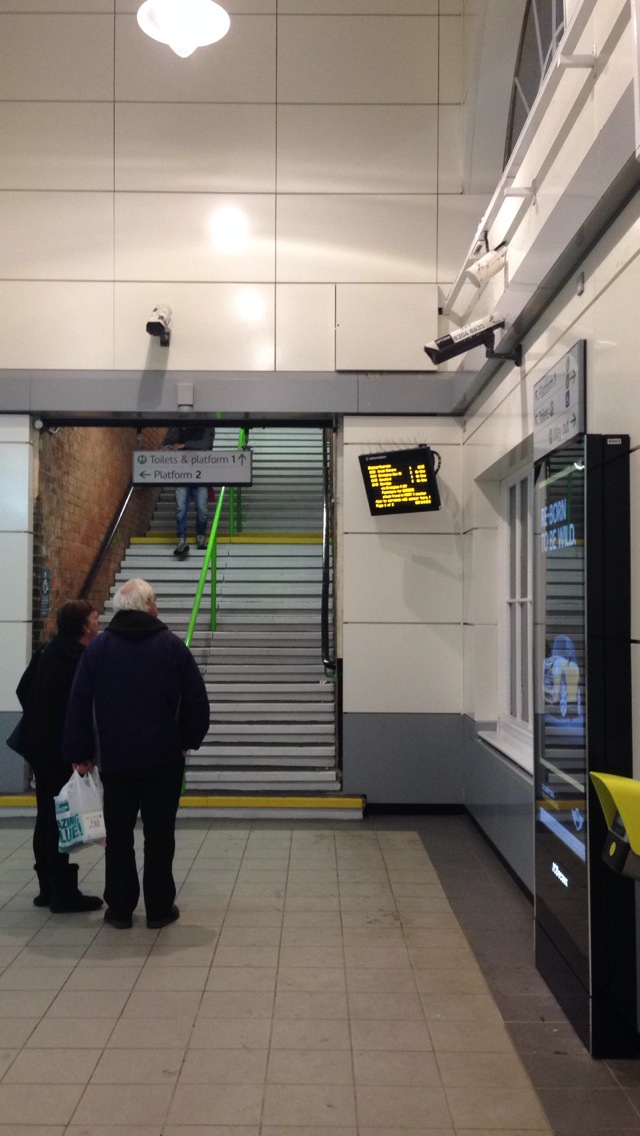
Interior of refurbished station (2014)

The station was upgraded in 2014, which included a refurbished subway, two new entrances with automatic doors, relocation of the lift at the second entrance to be enclosed in the station building and conversion of one of the railway arches into a bike shelter. The bridge was also strengthened and repainted.

Until May 2022, Great Western Railway ran limited services to Southampton Central and Brighton.

== Layout ==
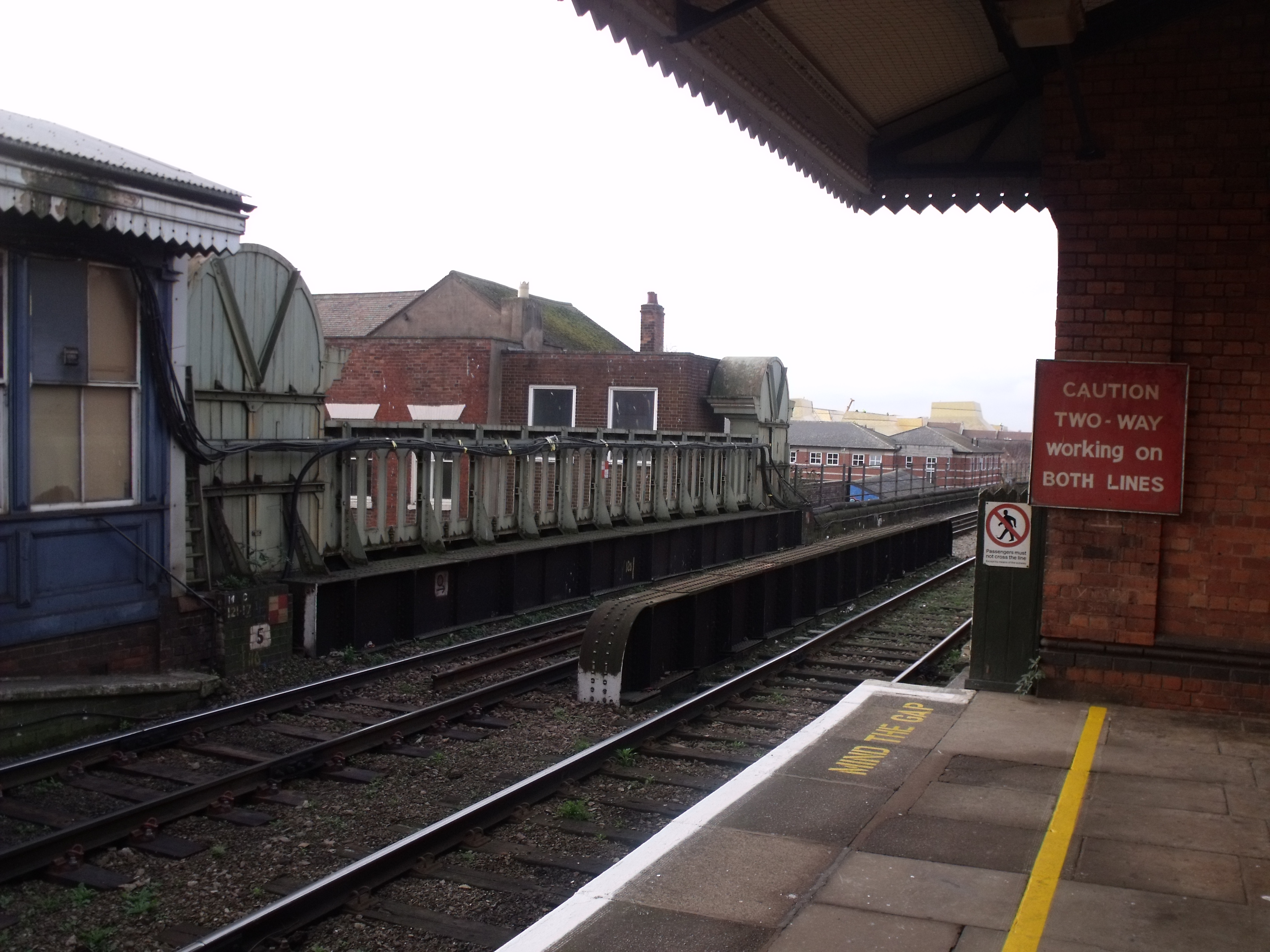
Sign warning of two-way working at the western end of the station

The station layout is unusual in that travelling east the two platforms serve different routes, rather than different directions. Platform 1 can only be accessed by trains via Worcester Shrub Hill (including trains to and from London Paddington and via Cheltenham Spa towards the south-west), while platform 2 can only be accessed from the east by trains running directly to and from Droitwich Spa, avoiding Shrub Hill. Signs at the station warn of "Two-way working on both lines".

Similar examples of this type of layout can be found at Glenrothes with Thornton in Fife and Bare Lane in Lancashire. This means that Great Western Railway services can only stop at platform 1, as all of these trains stop at Shrub Hill.

The station itself is built on a viaduct, meaning that space for expansion is restricted, but the platforms are nevertheless of ample length to accommodate a High Speed Train. Despite its small size, the remains of two signal boxes can be seen: one spanning the tracks and the second is now the station cafe, called Cafe Loco, at the end of platform 1.

== Services ==
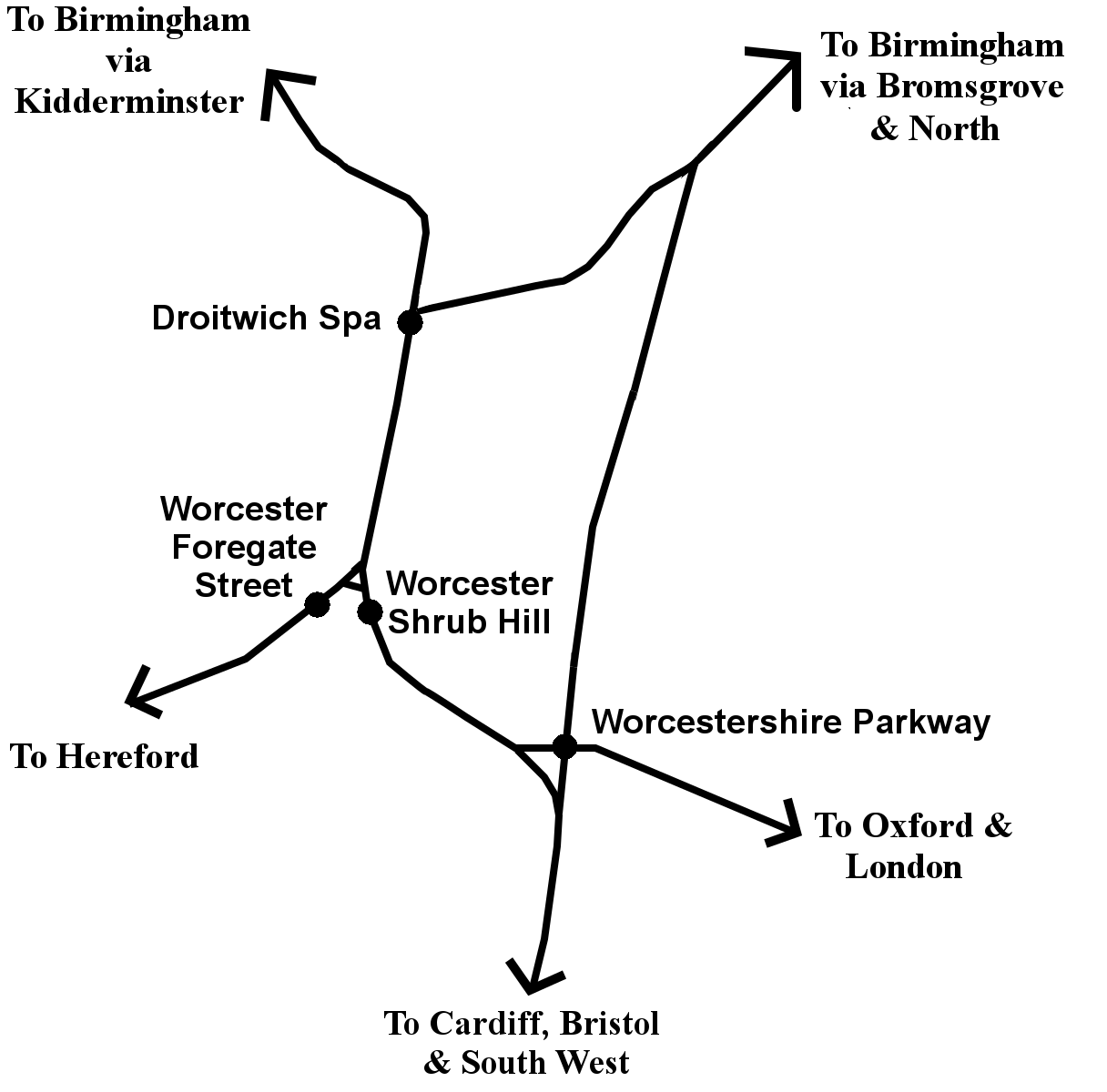
Map of railways around Worcester

The station is served by two train operating companies:

- West Midlands Trains operates services to Birmingham via two different routes, either to Birmingham New Street via Bromsgrove or to Birmingham Snow Hill via Kidderminster. There is an hourly service between Hereford and New Street and two trains per hour (three at peak times) to Birmingham Snow Hill, with many of the latter running beyond to either Stratford-upon-Avon or Dorridge; some also originate/terminate at Great Malvern or Whitlocks End on this route.
- Great Western Railway operates a regular service to London Paddington, via the Cotswold Line and Oxford. It also runs a service to Bristol Temple Meads, via Gloucester, with extensions through to Salisbury and Weymouth; these mainly start/terminate here, with only a limited service beyond to or from Great Malvern.

Preceding station	National Rail	Following station
Terminus	West Midlands Railway; Worcester – Kidderminster – Birmingham – Dorridge – Stratford	Droitwich Spa
Malvern Link	West Midlands Railway; Hereford – Great Malvern – Worcester – Bromsgrove – Birmingham	Droitwich Spa
Malvern Link	West Midlands Railway; Hereford – Great Malvern – Worcester – Bromsgrove – Birmingham	Worcester Shrub Hill
Malvern Link	Great Western Railway; Cotswold Line	Worcester Shrub Hill
Malvern Link	Great Western Railway; Worcester to Bristol	Worcester Shrub Hill
	Disused railways	
Henwick; Line open, station closed	Great Western Railway; Worcester and Hereford Railway	Worcester Shrub Hill; Line and station open

== See also ==
- Worcester Shrub Hill railway station
- Worcester (Norton) Parkway railway station
