= Malvern Wells =

Village in Worcestershire, England

Coordinates: 52.078479°N 2.332357°W

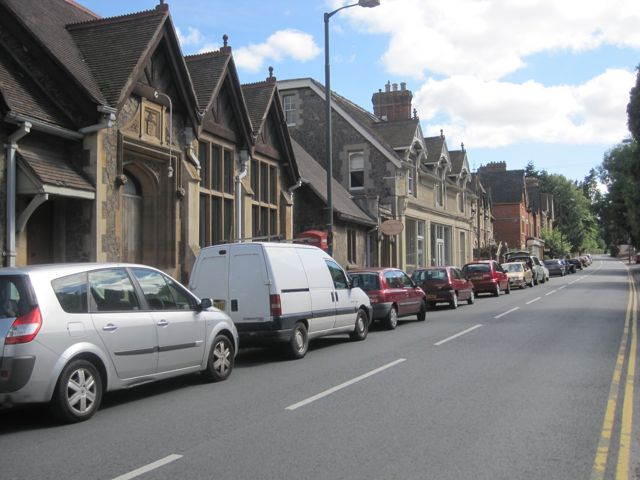
- Village centre, Malvern Wells

- Location within Worcestershire
- Population: 3,196
- OS grid reference: SO773422
- Civil parish: Malvern Wells
- District: Malvern Hills
- Shire county: Worcestershire
- Region: West Midlands
- Country: England
- Sovereign state: United Kingdom
- Post town: MALVERN
- Postcode district: WR14
- Police: West Mercia
- Fire: Hereford and Worcester
- Ambulance: West Midlands
- UK Parliament: West Worcestershire

Malvern Wells is a village and civil parish south of Great Malvern in the Malvern Hills district of Worcestershire, England. The parish, once known as South Malvern, was formed in 1894 from parts of the civil parishes of Hanley Castle, Welland, and the former parish of Great Malvern, and owes its development to the 19th-century boom years of Malvern as a spa town. Malvern Wells is a centre of commercial bottling of Malvern water. The population of the parishes of Malvern Wells and Little Malvern was recorded in 2011 as 3,196.

== Etymology ==
The name Malvern is first attested in a charter of around 1030, as Mælfern, and then in the Domesday Book of 1086 as Malferna. The name derives from the Common Brittonic words that survive in modern Welsh as moel ("bare") and bryn ("hill"); thus it once meant "bare hill". The name perhaps applied originally to the hill now called Worcester Beacon, after which Great Malvern and later Little Malvern, West Malvern, and the Malvern Hills were then named. The name Malvern Wells takes its name from these places, first being attested in 1831.

== Location ==
Malvern Wells lies on the eastern slopes of the Malvern Hills south of Great Malvern (the town centre of Malvern) and north of Little Malvern. It takes its name from the Malvern water issuing from springs on the hills, principally from the Holy Well and the Eye Well. The northern end of the parish includes the Wyche Cutting, the historic salt route pass through the hills, which form the border between the counties of Herefordshire (on the western side) and Worcestershire. The actual cutting through the granite hill face is at a height of 856 feet above sea level.

The northern part of the parish includes the "Fruitlands" housing estate. In the southern part of the parish is the settlement of Upper Welland and in the western part the settlements of Upper Wyche and Lower Wyche. To the east of the village of Malvern Wells and also in the parish is the Three Counties Showground.

== History ==
=== Wells ===
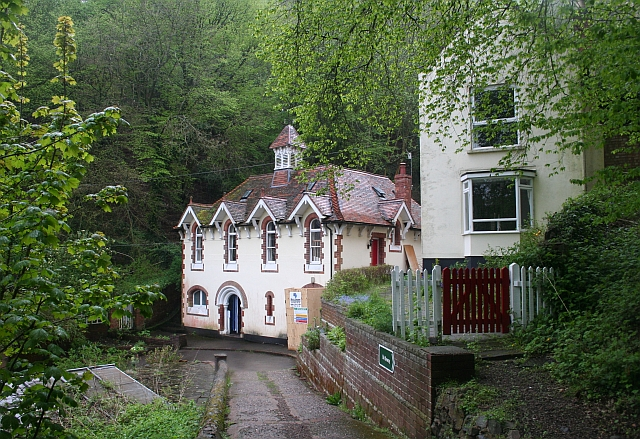
The Holy Well, Malvern Wells, a location of a Malvern Water bottling plant.

In 1558 Queen Elizabeth I granted the land to John Hornyold, lord of the manor, under the premise that any pilgrim or traveller should be able to draw rest and refreshment from the Holy Well, a covenant which still stands today. The first record of spring water being bottled in the UK is from 1622, at Holy Well. Holy Well was later used by the Schweppes Company as the source for bottled Malvern Water sold at the Great Exhibition of 1851.

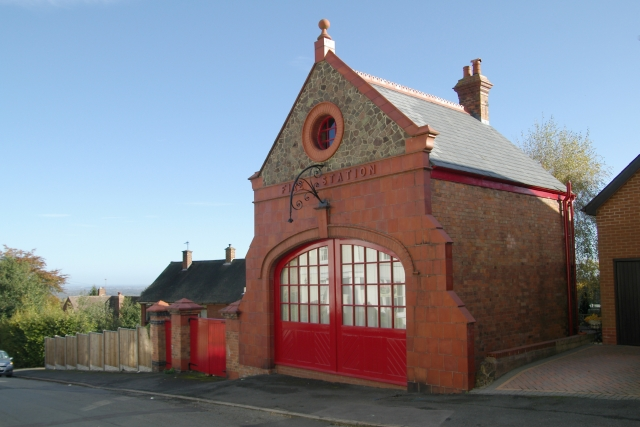
The former fire station. Fire services are provided by the fire station in Malvern Link

=== Railway history ===
Malvern Wells railway station, as part of the Worcester and Hereford Railway (which became part of the West Midland Railway then the Great Western Railway), opened on 25 May 1860, then closed again on 19 January 1861 before reopening 1 February 1864. It was closed finally on 5 April 1965.

Previously served by Malvern Hanley Road railway station on the Tewkesbury and Malvern Railway was a branch of the Midland Railway which ran from Ashchurch via Tewkesbury to Great Malvern. This opened on 16 May 1864. With the regrouping in 1923, it became part of the London Midland and Scottish Railway. The section from Malvern to Upton-upon-Severn was closed in December 1952. The remainder closed to passengers on 14 August 1961. Freight continued to be carried to Upton until July 1963 and to Tewkesbury until December 1964.

=== All Saints ===
All Saints, the parish church, was built by a local builder, William Porter, to a design by Troyte Griffith – a friend of Edward Elgar who is depicted in the "Enigma Variations". The church was consecrated on 19 November 1903. There is evidence to suggest that Elgar composed part of the "Enigma Variations" in the church, but his offer of the original manuscript of his oratorio "The Apostles", as a gift to the church, was refused by the Anglican church authorities because Elgar was a Roman Catholic and the oratorio was heavily based in that tradition. Next to the church is the Wyche School; "Land of Hope and Glory", set to Elgar's Pomp and Circumstance March No. 1, was first performed there in the presence of Elgar. In later life Elgar came to tire of the work for "its jingoism and the fact it overshadowed everything else he wrote."

== Amenities ==
The Malvern Wells War Memorial honours local people killed and injured in the First and Second World Wars. It was designed by the Arts and Crafts architect and designer C. F. A. Voysey, and was unveiled in 1920. The village has a petrol station, a convenience store, a post office and several other small businesses.

== Education ==
Abbey College, a secondary school and English language centre mainly for international students, is found at 253 Wells Road. Primary education is provided by Malvern Wells Church of England School and the Wyche Church of England School, which feed the two Malvern secondary schools of The Chase in Barnards Green, and Dyson Perrins in Malvern Link. Wells House School, a preparatory school for boys, closed in 1991.

== Transport ==
The nearer of the two Malvern railway stations to the village is Great Malvern on the Worcester to Hereford line. It has services to Birmingham and to London Paddington station. The village is served by a daily long-distance coach service between Worcester and London Victoria. There are regular bus links with Great Malvern and Malvern Link.

== Notable people ==
In birth order:

- Georgiana Chatterton (1806–1876), novelist and travel writer, died here on 6 February 1876.
- C. W. Stephens (c. 1845–1917), architect, was born here.
- Edward Elgar (1857–1934), composer. Elgar and his wife leased a house they named Craig Lea, an anagram of the family initials, at 86 Wells Road, Malvern Wells.
- Horace Millichamp Moore-Jones (1868–1922), New Zealand artist and Gallipoli veteran, was born here.
- Hugh Sherwood Cordery (1880–1973), senior New Zealand customs official, was born here.
- John Harber (1889–1962), first-class cricketer, was born here.
- Rick Stein (born 1947), master chef and television broadcaster, attended Wells House School in Malvern Wells.
