= Malvern Hanley Road railway station =

Former railway station in Worcestershire, England

Coordinates: 52.0790°N 2.3162°W

Malvern Hanley Road
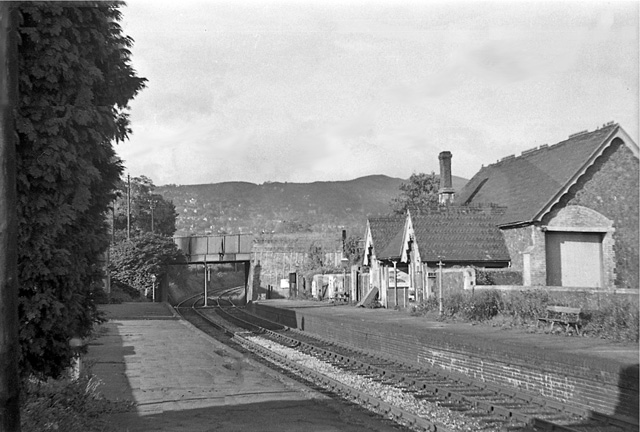
- The station in 1951

General information
- Location: Malvern Wells, Malvern Hills, Worcestershire; England
- Platforms: 2

Other information
- Status: Disused

History
- Original company: Midland Railway
- Post-grouping: London, Midland and Scottish Railway; British Railways

Key dates
- 1 July 1862: Station opens as Malvern Wells (MR)
- 2 March 1951: renamed Malvern Hanley Road
- 1 December 1952: Station closes
Location

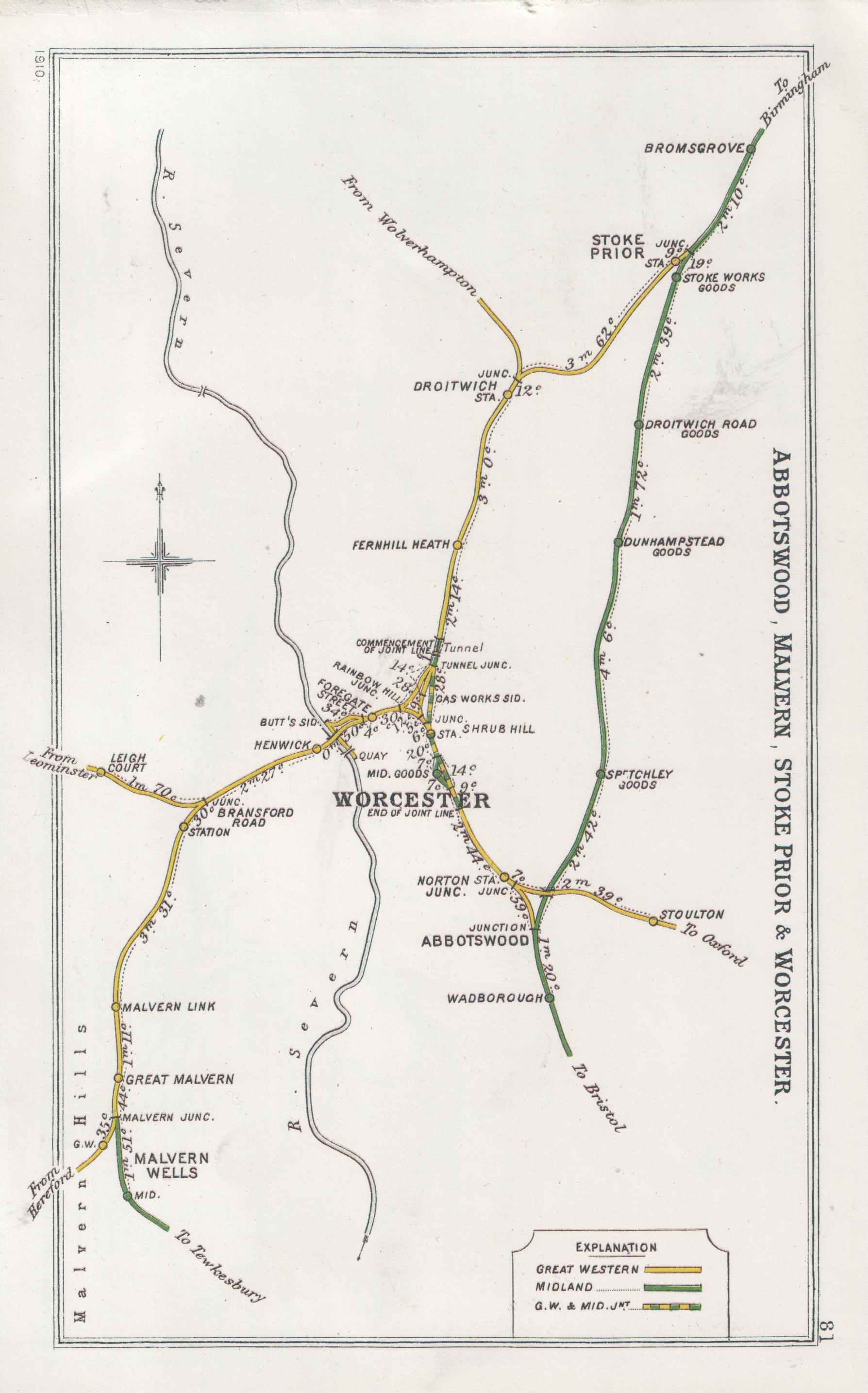
Pre Grouping railway junctions around Abbotswood, Malvern (lower left), Stoke Prior & Worcester

Malvern Hanley Road railway station was a Midland Railway (MR) station on the Malvern, Tewkesbury and Ashchurch line.

The station was opened as Malvern Wells on 1 July 1862 by the Tewkesbury and Malvern Railway before it became part of the MR. (Note: There is some confusion about station names in Malvern. The GWR had three stations on its Hereford to Worcester line, they were: Malvern Wells (which was usually suffixed with GW in timetables).; Then came the junction with the Midland Railway called Malvern Junction but there was no actual station located at the junction.; Great Malvern.; Malvern Link.; The Midland Railway station was also called Malvern Wells and was often suffixed with Mid or MR in the timetables. Bradshaws timetables for 1895 and 1922 both have a note attached to the MR station saying Hanley Road Station; about 1¾ mile to The Common Station, Great Western Railway.)

The station was host to two LMS caravans from 1935 to 1939.

The station was renamed Malvern Hanley Road on 2 March 1951 only to close a year later on 1 December 1952 when the line closed.

Preceding station	Disused railways	Following station
Great Malvern; Line closed	Tewkesbury and Malvern Railway; Midland Railway	Upton-on-Severn; Line and station closed
