= Ripple railway station =

Former railway station in Worcestershire, England

Ripple
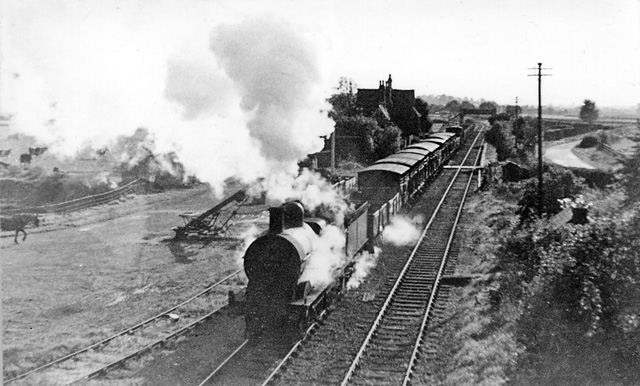
- Ripple railway station in 1951

General information
- Location: Ripple, Worcestershire; England
- Coordinates: 52.0370°N 2.1877°W
- Grid reference: SO871376
- Platforms: 2

Other information
- Status: Disused

History
- Original company: Midland Railway
- Post-grouping: London, Midland and Scottish Railway

Key dates
- 16 May 1864: Opened
- 14 August 1961: Closed
Location

Ripple railway station was a station on the Midland Railway between Great Malvern and Evesham. It opened on 16 May 1864 by the Tewkesbury and Malvern Railway and was closed 14 August 1961.

Preceding station	Disused railways	Following station
Upton-on-Severn; Line and station closed	Tewkesbury and Malvern Railway; Midland Railway	Tewkesbury; Line and station closed
