= Wheatpieces =

Coordinates: 51.984°N 02.143°W

- Location within Gloucestershire
- OS grid reference: SO9032
- Civil parish: Wheatpieces
- District: Tewkesbury
- Shire county: Gloucestershire
- Region: South West
- Country: England
- Sovereign state: United Kingdom
- Post town: Tewkesbury
- Postcode district: GL20
- Dialling code: 01684
- Police: Gloucestershire
- Fire: Gloucestershire
- Ambulance: South Western

Wheatpieces is a large housing development and civil parish in Gloucestershire, England. It lies immediately east of Tewkesbury, and is in effect a suburb of that town. The River Swilgate forms the western boundary of the parish.

The estate was developed in the 1990s on agricultural land in the western part of the parish of Walton Cardiff. In 2008 the civil parish of Wheatpieces was created from the western part of the former civil parish of Walton Cardiff, which was abolished. The remainder of the civil parish of Walton Cardiff became part of the parish of Ashchurch Rural.

On 5 October 2021, a stabbing incident on the estate killed one and injured two. This subsequently led to a murder charge being brought against Can Arslan, a resident on the estate.
