= Aston Cross =

Aston Cross may refer to:

- part of Aston, Birmingham, West Midlands
- Aston Cross, Ashchurch, Gloucestershire
