= Walton Cardiff =

Village in Gloucestershire, England

Coordinates: 51.99°N 02.136°W

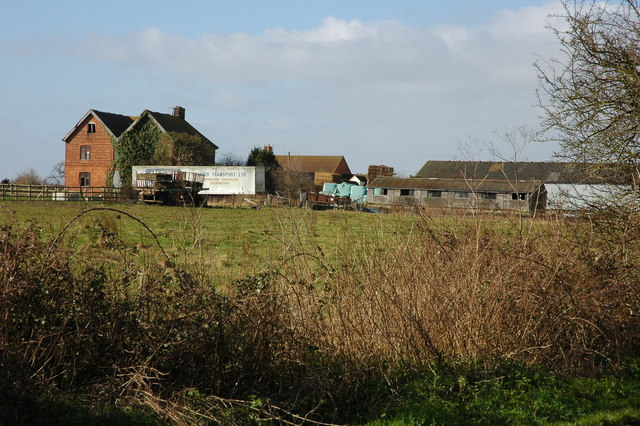
- Chapel Farm

- Location within Gloucestershire
- Population: 1,291 (2001 census)
- OS grid reference: SO9032
- Civil parish: Ashchurch Rural
- District: Tewkesbury
- Shire county: Gloucestershire
- Region: South West
- Country: England
- Sovereign state: United Kingdom
- Post town: Tewkesbury
- Postcode district: GL20
- Dialling code: 01684
- Police: Gloucestershire
- Fire: Gloucestershire
- Ambulance: South Western
- UK Parliament: Tewkesbury

Walton Cardiff is a small village and former civil parish, now in the parish of Ashchurch Rural, in the Borough of Tewkesbury, in Gloucestershire, England. In 2001, the parish had a population of 1291.

== History ==
The village is named Walton in the Domesday Book of 1086. The name is of Old English origin, and means "wall settlement", probably referring to the enclosure around the site of the manor house at the southern end of the village. In 1166 the manor was owned by William of Cardiff, and the manor remained in the Cardiff family until the late 14th century.

In the middle ages the manor formed part of the parish of Tewkesbury, but in the 17th century Walton Cardiff became a separate parish. The parish extended to the River Swilgate in the west, and to the main road running east from Tewkesbury (now the A46) in the north. The parish became a civil parish in 1866. In 1935, the area north of Tirle Brook was transferred to Tewkesbury parish, and was later developed as part of the district of Newtown.

In the 1990s, a large area in the western part of the parish was developed as the Wheatpieces estate. On 1 April 2008 that part of the parish was separated to form the new civil parish of Wheatpieces. The remainder of the civil parish of Walton Cardiff was abolished and became part of the parish of Ashchurch Rural. Despite now being in separate parishes both the old village and the estate retain their postal addresses as "Walton Cardiff, Tewkesbury".
