= Tewkesbury School =

School in Tewkesbury, Gloucestershire, England

Tewkesbury Academy

Location
- Ashchurch Road; Tewkesbury, Gloucestershire, GL20 8DF; England
- Coordinates: 51°59′46″N 2°07′56″W

Information
- Type: Academy
- Motto: Expecting and achieving success
- Established: c. 1972
- Department for Education URN: 137752 Tables
- Ofsted: Reports
- Chair of Governors: Steve Hawkins
- Head Teacher: Kathleen McGillycuddy
- Gender: Both
- Age: 11 to 18
- Enrolment: 1,400
- Houses: Bronte; Brunel; Elgar; Hodgkin; Keller; Priestley
- Website: tewkesburyschool.org

Tewkesbury Academy (previously Tewkesbury School) is a secondary school in the English town of Tewkesbury in Gloucestershire. It has been an academy since 2012; in July 2023 its name was changed to reflect this. Since 2022 the head teacher has been Kathleen McGillycuddy.

== History ==
=== 20th century ===
The school was the product of the decision taken in 1969 to make Tewkesbury switch to comprehensive secondary education.

Formerly, Tewkesbury had had four secondary schools:

- the Grammar School for Boys, located at Southwick Park to the south of the town (later offices of the Severn-Trent Water Authority's Lower Severn Division, after that Equinox Maintenance Limited, then Cambian Southwick Park School - a residential school for autistic pupils, then Orbis Abbey Rose School - also a residential school for autistic pupils, currently OneSchool Global's Tewkesbury Campus for general education)
- the Grammar School for Girls, known as the "High School", in Church Street (later the Abbey School, now private premises under development)
- the Secondary Modern School for Boys in Chance Street (now the C of E Primary School) and
- Elmbury Secondary Modern School for Girls, a modern premises on the Ashchurch Road, opened in 1960.

It was the latter whose buildings were chosen to form the nucleus of a new Tewkesbury Comprehensive School, with all of the town's secondary education being concentrated on the one site, and the former schools closing.

After a major building programme, enlarging the old Elmbury School to several times its original size, the new comprehensive, known as Tewkesbury School, was opened on 5 September 1972 with about 1,200 pupils on its books, and John C. Faull as its first head teacher.

The official opening took place on 16 November 1972, performed by Professor Dorothy Hodgkin (1910–1994), Chancellor of the University of Bristol from 1970 till 1988, winner of the Nobel Prize in Chemistry in 1964 and the Copley Medal from the Royal Society in 1976.

=== 21st century ===
The most recent Ofsted inspection in November 2021 saw the school retain a "Good" rating, stating that "Leaders have raised expectations of academic standards in the school. Pupils are resilient and do not give up. Pupils attend school regularly".

The school previously gained both Sportsmark and Artsmark awards, whilst also qualifying as an Investor in People.

The school canteen has seen many different changes over the years, with catering currently provided by Aramark.

A sled used as part of the famous Antarctic expedition to the South Pole by Captain Robert Falcon Scott and his team, formerly on display in the former Boys' Grammar School's dining hall, is housed in the Humanities building at Tewkesbury Academy due to the school's links with Dr. Edward Adrian Wilson. The sled had been donated to the Grammar School by Sir Raymond Priestley who was born in Tewkesbury and who participated in the Antarctic Expeditions of Shackleton and Scott.

In July 2011, John Reilly resigned from headteacher to be replaced by Martin McLeman as interim headteacher. In July 2011, it was announced that Gary Watson, formerly headteacher at Maidenhill School, Stroud, would take over the position from January 2012.

Gary Watson retired as headteacher in August 2022. Kathleen McGillycuddy, formerly principal of Broadoak Academy, Weston-super-Mare, became the headteacher on 1 September 2022.

As of 2023, the senior team consists of headteacher Kathleen McGillycuddy, deputy head Clare de Glanville, and assistant heads Angela Parker and Vivienne Whiting.

On 10 July 2023, police were called to the school following reports that a pupil had attacked a teacher. A teenage boy was arrested and the teacher was admitted to hospital with "suspected stab wounds." This was in an incident where a teacher intervened with said pupil trying to stab another.

In February 2026, several teachers voted to go on strike at the school, effectively closing it for five days. Members of NASUWT voted for strike action due to failure by management to address abusive and disruptive behaviour by a minority of pupils.

== Notable former pupils ==
- Roland Lee, Commonwealth Games swimmer (silver and bronze medallist in 1986)
- Mark Payne, footballer for English team Cheltenham Town, and second-tier Dutch team SC Cambuur
- Sarah Hoefflin, Olympics gold medallist from Switzerland
