= The Royal Hop Pole =

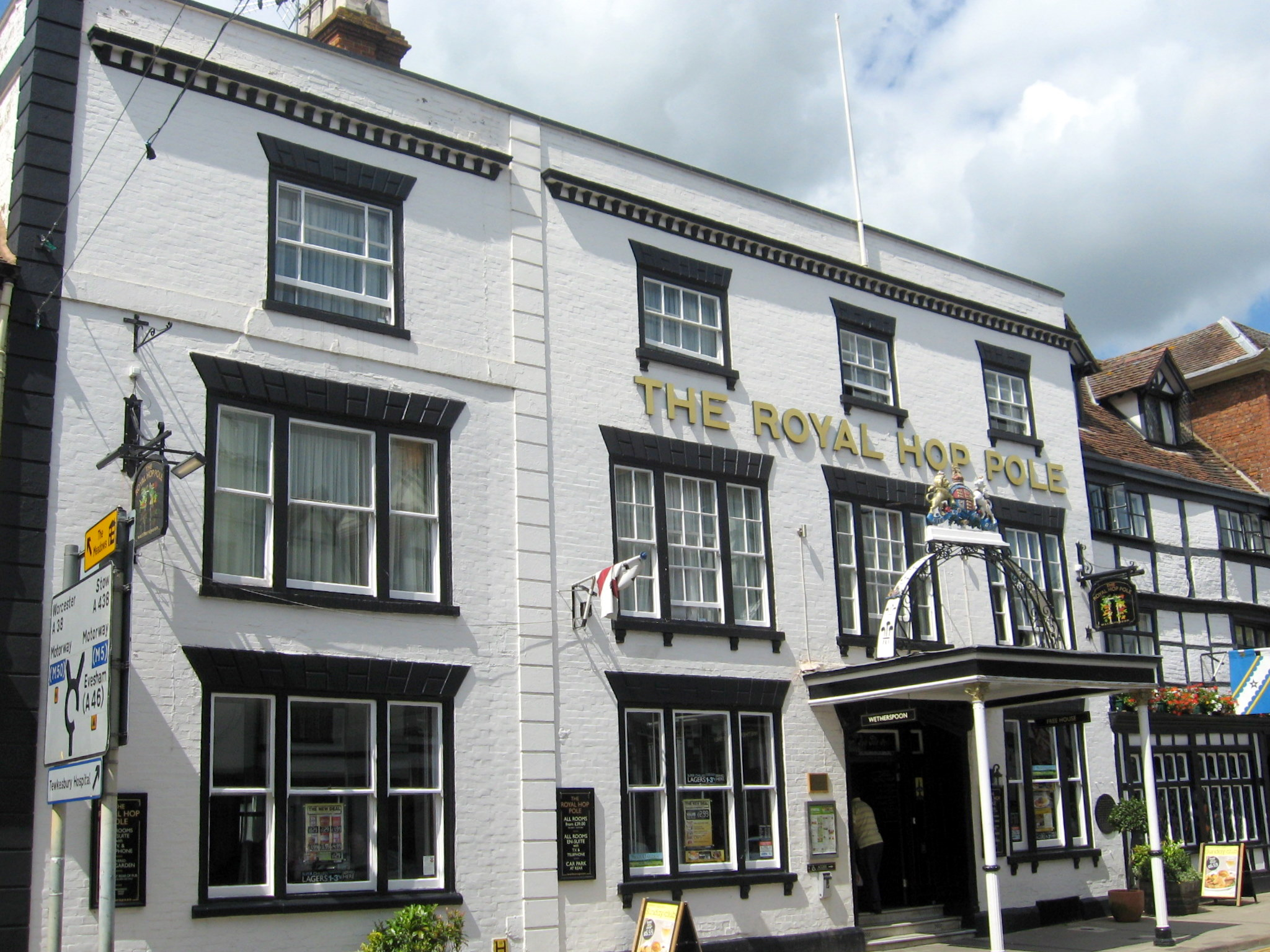
- The Royal Hop Pole (2016)

- Location within Gloucestershire
- 51°59′31″N 2°09′31″W
- Location: Tewkesbury, Gloucestershire, England

Site notes
- Owner: J D Wetherspoon
- Website: https://www.jdwetherspoon.com/pubs/all-pubs/england/gloucestershire/the-royal-hop-pole-tewkesbury

Listed Building – Grade II*
- Designated: 4 March 1952
- Reference no.: 1205936

The Royal Hop Pole is a listed pub in Tewkesbury, Gloucestershire. Located on Church Street, it is an English Heritage hotel. It has recently been converted into a part of the Wetherspoons pub chain. It is famous for being mentioned in Charles Dickens' The Pickwick Papers.

== Location ==
The pub is located on the A438, close to the River Avon and Tewkesbury Abbey.

== History ==
The pub is thought to have been founded in the 15th century, originally called the Crone, or Crown. Medieval wall paintings have been uncovered in the building. The Royal prefix and the right to display the Royal crest was granted in September 1891 after the then Princess Mary of Teck (Queen Mary Royal Consort of George V). The pub is mentioned in Charles Dickens' Pickwick Papers. It was purchased by J.D. Wetherspoon and re-opened in May 2008. During renovation work a former medieval banqueting hall was discovered in the structure. Today the building is still run as a hotel and has 28 bedrooms.

== Architecture ==
The structure comprises two structurally separate buildings in its street front. The eastern half consisted of a three-storied, two-bay range jettied towards the street, with a contemporary hall wing to the north, the whole appearance of the later 15th century. The range to the street had a single large room on the ground and the first floor. The ground-floor room has exposed ceiling joists and was once lit by a range of two-light windows; it connects by a four-centred arched doorway with a wide side-passage, of which the original street doorway, with carved spandrels, moulded jambs, and brackets, is a larger version of similarly placed doorways in other houses of the town. The first-floor room was of some pretensions, having had two three-light windows with traceried heads and an oriel window, replaced in the 17th century, over the entrance to the side passage; the main ceiling beams have chamfered soffit-nibs. The second floor was once open to the roof, and the partition truss had shallow arch-braces to a collar-beam which had a central boss. The contemporary hall wing is of three bays; the floor area of the hall extended over all three, but the bay adjoining the range fronting the street had an upper story. The upper story was built above an elaborately moulded bressummer, supported by arched brackets, and there is a waist rail corresponding in height and in decorative detail in the east wall of the hall. A similarly enriched wallplate and cornice above indicate the quality of the hall. The former open truss has a deep arch-braced collar beam, with curved wind-braces to single purlins. A chimney-stack at the north end and an upper floor with richly moulded joists were inserted in the earlier 16th century. A two-storied wing adjoining the northwest corner of the hall wing and similarly aligned was built in the late 14th century. The upper rooms were open to the roof, which had a collar-purlin supported by crown-posts with four-way brackets. The cambered tie-beams are braced from principal posts in the side walls. An ovolo moulding cut from the solid runs from each face of the tie beams and along the upper edge of the wall plates. Riven lath filling in the internal trusses may represent an early division of the wing into separate lodgings.
