= Eckington railway station =

Former railway station in Worcestershire, England

Eckington
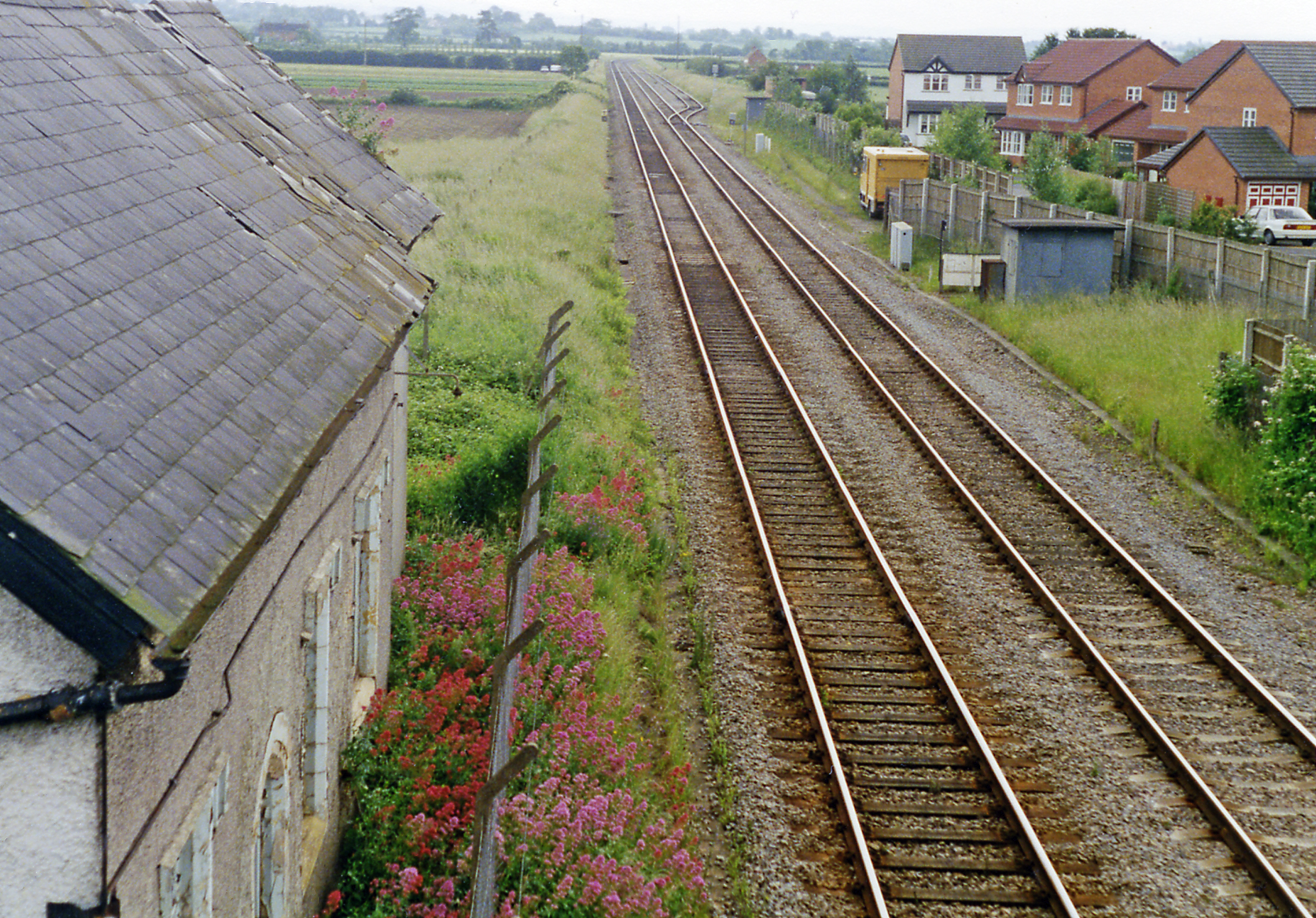
- Station remains in 1993

General information
- Location: Eckington, Worcestershire; England
- Coordinates: 52.0690°N 2.1155°W
- Grid reference: SO920412
- Platforms: 2

Other information
- Status: Disused

History
- Original company: Birmingham and Gloucester Railway
- Pre-grouping: Midland Railway
- Post-grouping: London, Midland and Scottish Railway

Key dates
- 24 June 1840: Opened
- 4 January 1965: Closed
Location

Eckington railway station was a railway station to serve Eckington in Worcestershire.

The station was opened by the Birmingham and Gloucester Railway in 1840. The buildings were "erected in the Gothic style, very much like those on some of the Scotch railways recently opened to the public."

The station closed to passengers on 4 January 1965.

Preceding station	Disused railways	Following station
Bredon	Birmingham and Gloucester Railway	Defford
