= John Harber =

English cricketer (1889–1962)

John Harber (12 November 1889 – 11 August 1962) was an English first-class cricketer. Born in Malvern Wells, Worcestershire, Harber played only once at first-class level, for Worcestershire against Derbyshire at New Road in August 1914. This was Worcestershire's final game before county cricket was suspended owing to World War I; in the match, he took three wickets for 46 runs, including that of Archibald Slater in both innings.

When Harber had Slater caught for 75 in the second innings, it was the last wicket to be taken by a Worcestershire bowler in first-class cricket until a friendly match against Gloucestershire in 1919 - and as the county did not rejoin the County Championship until 1920, in that competition it was the last for nearly six years.

He died in Hill Croome, also in Worcestershire, at the age of 72.
