= Bredon railway station =

Former railway station in Worcestershire, England

Bredon
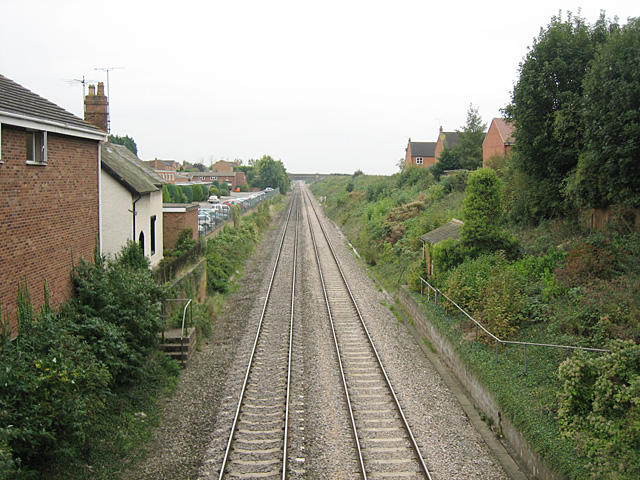
- Station site in 2005.

General information
- Location: Bredon, Wychavon, Worcestershire; England
- Coordinates: 52.0292°N 2.1086°W
- Grid reference: SO926368
- Platforms: 2

Other information
- Status: Disused

History
- Opened: 24 June 1840
- Closed: 4 January 1965
- Original company: Birmingham and Gloucester Railway
- Pre-grouping: Midland Railway
- Post-grouping: London, Midland and Scottish Railway
Location

Bredon railway station was on the Birmingham–Gloucester railway line to the north of Ashchurch for Tewkesbury railway station. The station closed in 1965.

== History ==
The first section of the Birmingham and Gloucester Railway, between Bromsgrove and Cheltenham, opened on 24 June 1840, and among the original stations was one at Bredon. The station was 35 miles 11.26 chains (56.554 km) from Camp Hill, and the adjacent stations Eckington and Ashchurch opened the same day.

The station closed to goods on 1 July 1963, and to passengers on 4 January 1965.

The line through the site of the station remains in use as part of the Bristol to Birmingham main line.

Preceding station	Disused railways	Following station
Tewkesbury	Birmingham and Gloucester Railway	Eckington
Ashchurch	Birmingham and Gloucester Railway	Eckington
