= Tewkesbury railway station =

Former railway station in Gloucestershire, England

Tewkesbury
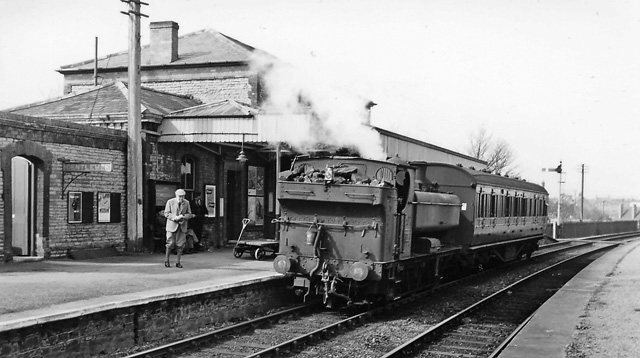
- Tewkesbury station in 1961, five months before closure.

General information
- Location: Tewkesbury, Borough of Tewkesbury; England
- Coordinates: 51.9962°N 2.1483°W
- Grid reference: SO898331
- Platforms: 2

Other information
- Status: Disused

History
- Original company: Birmingham and Gloucester Railway
- Post-grouping: London, Midland and Scottish Railway

Key dates
- 21 July 1840: Station opens
- 16 May 1864: Rebuilt on new line
- 14 August 1961: Station closes for passengers
- December 1964: Closed for freight traffic
Location

Tewkesbury railway station was a stop on the Midland Railway between Great Malvern and Evesham. It served the town of Tewkesbury, in Gloucestershire, England; it was open for passenger services between 1840 and 1961.

== History ==
The first station at Tewkesbury was in the High Street. It was originally opened by the Birmingham and Gloucester Railway in 1840 as the terminus of its branch from Ashchurch. The first station was replaced in 1864 by a new one built outside the town centre for the Tewkesbury and Malvern Railway. This closed on 14 August 1961, when the Ashchurch to Upton-on-Severn passenger service was withdrawn by British Railways (through trains to Great Malvern had previously ceased in December 1952). Freight traffic continued until final closure in December 1964.

The town is currently served by Ashchurch for Tewkesbury railway station, approximately two miles from Tewkesbury.

== Accidents and incidents ==
Henry Kirwan, stationmaster, lost his life in an accident in 1858. An engine was going towards the quay and Henry Kirwan was on the footplate. He jumped off whilst the engine was still in motion when he fell against a wall and was struck by the engine. Despite having his foot amputated he later succumbed to his injuries.

== The site today ==
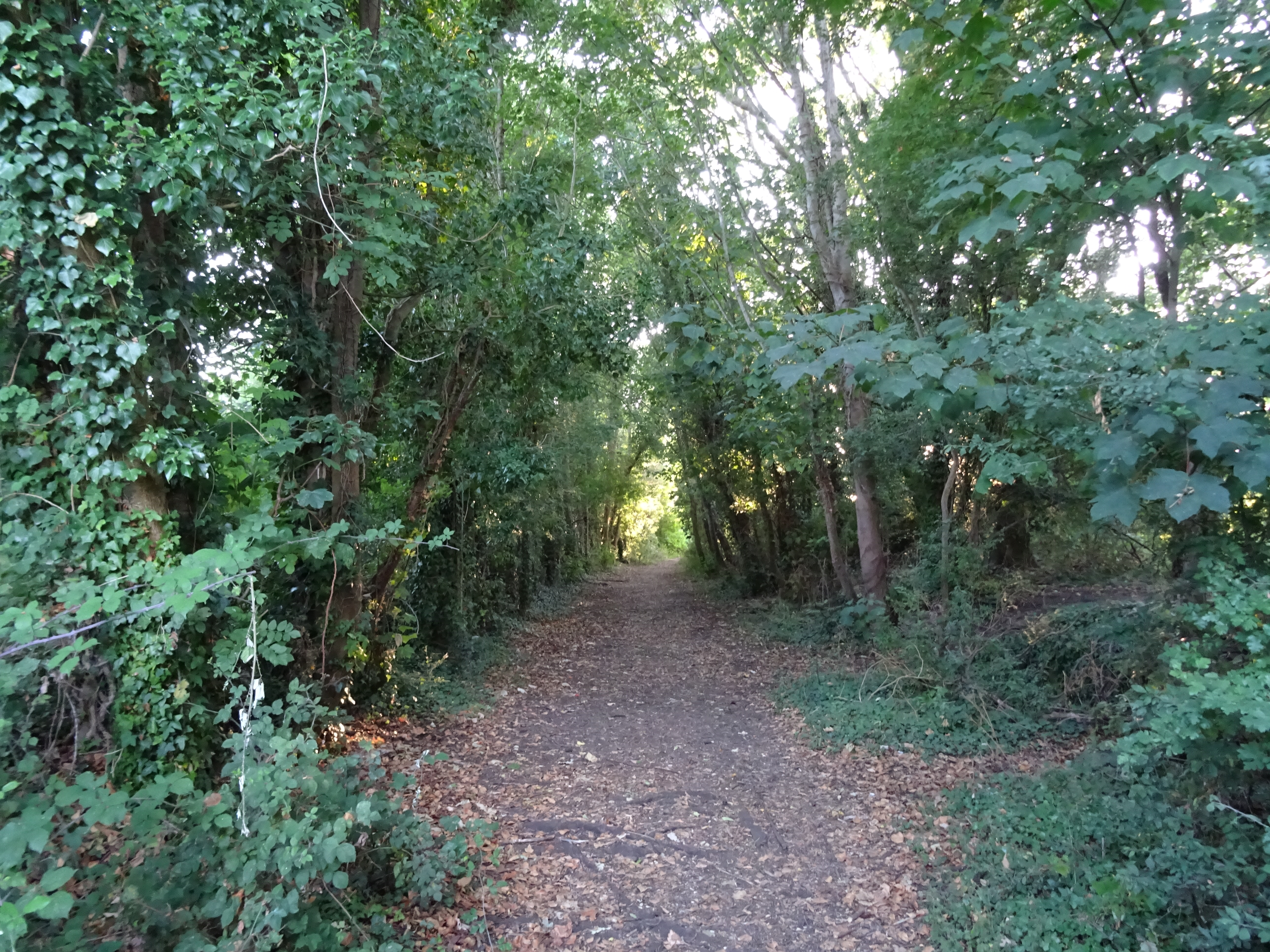
Site of the station in July 2025

No buildings from the station remain although the platforms remain on either side of a public footpath with trees grown on top of them just east of Station Lane.

Preceding station	Disused railways	Following station
Ashchurch	Birmingham and Gloucester Railway	Bredon
Ripple; Line and station closed	Tewkesbury and Malvern Railway; Midland Railway	Ashchurch; Line closed, station open
