= John Barston =

John Barston (c1545-c1612) was an English writer, law and 'important civic figure'.

Barston was from Tewkesbury. He went to St John's College, Cambridge and the Inns of Court. In 1576, he published his work, The Safeguard of Society, describing the corporate life of Tewkesbury.
