= Tewkesbury =

Town in Gloucestershire, England

Coordinates: 51.99°N 2.16°W

- Town and civil parish
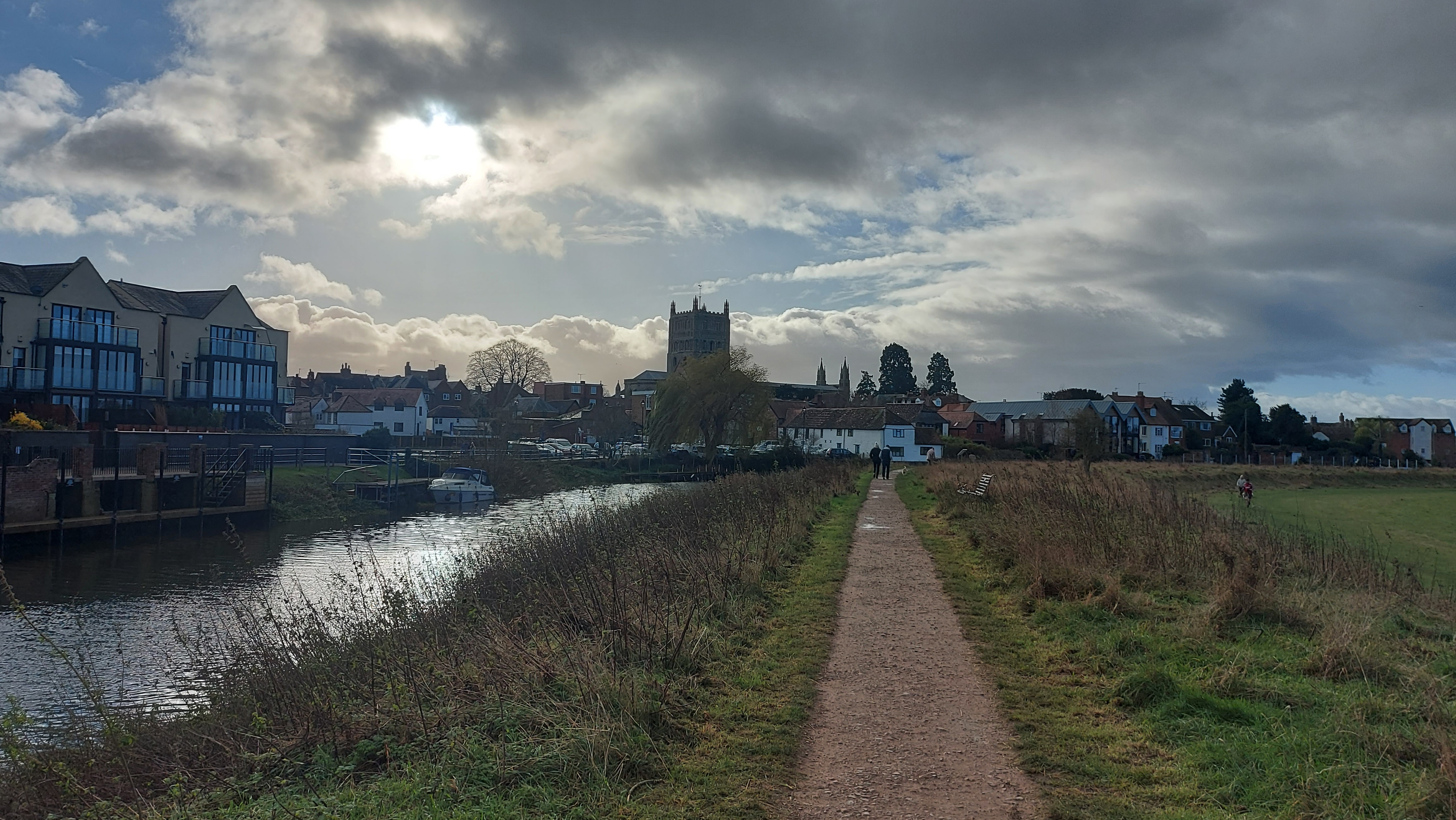
- Tewkesbury Abbey and Mill Avon from Ham path

- Location within Gloucestershire
- Population: 20,360 (built-up area, 2021 Census)
- OS grid reference: SO8932
  - London: 94 miles (151 km) ESE
- Civil parish: Tewkesbury
- District: Tewkesbury
- Shire county: Gloucestershire
- Region: South West
- Country: England
- Sovereign state: United Kingdom
- Post town: Tewkesbury
- Postcode district: GL20
- Dialling code: 01684
- Police: Gloucestershire
- Fire: Gloucestershire
- Ambulance: South Western
- UK Parliament: Tewkesbury

Tewkesbury (/ˈtjuːksbəri/ TEWKS-bər-ee) is a market town and civil parish in the north of Gloucestershire, England. The town grew following the construction of Tewkesbury Abbey in the twelfth century and played a significant role in the Wars of the Roses. It stands at the confluence of the River Severn and the River Avon, and became an important trading point. The town gives its name to the Borough of Tewkesbury. The town lies near the border with Worcestershire, marked largely by the Carrant Brook (a tributary of the River Avon).

The name Tewkesbury is thought to come from Theoc, the name of a Saxon who founded a hermitage there in the 7th century, and in the Old English language was called Theocsbury. An erroneous derivation from Theotokos (the Greek title of Mary, mother of God) enjoyed currency in the monastic period of the town's history.

The Battle of Tewkesbury, which took place on 4 May 1471, was one of the decisive battles of the Wars of the Roses and is marked annually by a medieval festival in the town, including historical re-enactment. Tewkesbury is also the only town in England to be semi coastal as it spends the winter months surrounded by water.

== Geography ==
=== Geographic position ===
The town is situated approximately halfway between the cities of Gloucester and Worcester, positioned where natural rises in the land allowed early settlers of the town to avoid flooding, yet also to take advantage of the fertile soils and transport connections. The layout of the town centre and radiating trunk roads remains largely unchanged since medieval times.

=== Climate ===
Tewkesbury has an Oceanic climate (Köppen: Cfb), with pleasantly warm summers, cool, damp winters, and occasional rainfall.

Tewkesbury's very low elevation in the Avon Valley and its inland location gives the town a slightly warmer climate year round compared with surrounding areas. Furthermore, multiple rivers drain into the Avon Valley from nearby higher terrain over the Cotswolds and the Malvern Hills, making the town susceptible to flooding.

The nearest official weather station is located (at a similar elevation) in nearby Cheltenham, the data for which is shown in the table below.

Climate data for Cheltenham (1991–2020 normals, extremes 1889–2001)
| Month | Jan | Feb | Mar | Apr | May | Jun | Jul | Aug | Sep | Oct | Nov | Dec | Year |
|---|---|---|---|---|---|---|---|---|---|---|---|---|---|
| Record high °C (°F) | 15.0 (59.0) | 18.0 (64.4) | 22.2 (72.0) | 26.7 (80.1) | 29.4 (84.9) | 34.6 (94.3) | 35.9 (96.6) | 37.1 (98.8) | 32.6 (90.7) | 26.7 (80.1) | 17.5 (63.5) | 16.2 (61.2) | 37.1 (98.8) |
| Mean daily maximum °C (°F) | 8.0 (46.4) | 8.6 (47.5) | 11.3 (52.3) | 14.6 (58.3) | 18.1 (64.6) | 20.8 (69.4) | 23.2 (73.8) | 22.2 (72.0) | 19.5 (67.1) | 15.1 (59.2) | 11.0 (51.8) | 8.5 (47.3) | 15.1 (59.2) |
| Daily mean °C (°F) | 5.2 (41.4) | 5.5 (41.9) | 7.5 (45.5) | 9.9 (49.8) | 13.2 (55.8) | 15.9 (60.6) | 18.3 (64.9) | 17.7 (63.9) | 15.0 (59.0) | 11.5 (52.7) | 8.0 (46.4) | 5.5 (41.9) | 11.1 (52.0) |
| Mean daily minimum °C (°F) | 2.3 (36.1) | 2.3 (36.1) | 3.6 (38.5) | 5.1 (41.2) | 8.2 (46.8) | 11.0 (51.8) | 13.4 (56.1) | 13.2 (55.8) | 10.5 (50.9) | 7.9 (46.2) | 4.9 (40.8) | 2.4 (36.3) | 7.1 (44.8) |
| Record low °C (°F) | −20.1 (−4.2) | −13.9 (7.0) | −11.7 (10.9) | −6.1 (21.0) | −3.3 (26.1) | −0.3 (31.5) | 2.8 (37.0) | 1.6 (34.9) | −0.8 (30.6) | −6.1 (21.0) | −8.6 (16.5) | −13.1 (8.4) | −20.1 (−4.2) |
| Average precipitation mm (inches) | 78.0 (3.07) | 65.8 (2.59) | 51.3 (2.02) | 69.2 (2.72) | 65.5 (2.58) | 71.3 (2.81) | 70.4 (2.77) | 72.3 (2.85) | 69.2 (2.72) | 80.5 (3.17) | 88.8 (3.50) | 84.8 (3.34) | 867.2 (34.14) |
| Average precipitation days (≥ 1.0 mm) | 12.8 | 11.0 | 10.7 | 11.4 | 11.0 | 10.5 | 10.7 | 11.2 | 10.2 | 12.6 | 13.7 | 13.4 | 139.0 |
| Mean monthly sunshine hours | 56.9 | 80.0 | 116.1 | 158.6 | 195.0 | 189.4 | 200.6 | 181.2 | 141.4 | 106.5 | 64.3 | 52.8 | 1,542.8 |
Source 1: Met Office
Source 2: Starlings Roost Weather

=== Expansion ===
In 1965, Tewkesbury borough, Gloucestershire, was enlarged by incorporating the then-new Mitton housing estate, on land previously in Bredon parish, Worcestershire, as part of the West Midland Counties Order. The estate now forms part of the "Tewkesbury Town with Mitton" borough council ward, which also covers Tewkesbury town centre. A further housing project in Mitton was completed in the first decade of 2000. Mitton is now a contiguous low-density rural suburb connected to Tewkesbury. Other suburbs include Newtown, Wheatpieces and Northway.

=== Nearby places ===
- Bredon
- Bishop's Cleeve
- Cheltenham
- Evesham
- Gloucester
- Pershore
- Malvern (Great Malvern)
- Upton upon Severn
- Cotswolds
- Forest of Dean
- Malvern Hills
- Winchcombe
- Gretton

== Demography ==
At the 2021 UK census the Tewkesbury parish had a population of 10,663. If the neighbouring parishes of Wheatpieces (3,582), Northway (4,859) and Ashchurch Rural (1,814) are added, the figure rises to 20,918. The Tewkesbury urban area is divided in two by the north–south running M5 motorway, opened in February 1971. However, the town is generally considered as the built-up area to the immediate east and west of the M5 at junction 9, with the town centre, abbey and old town situated to the west. The close proximity of large areas of land that are prone to flooding, as evidenced by the severe floods that struck the region in July 2007, would make further expansion difficult. However, the present Borough of Tewkesbury, created on 1 April 1974, also contains a large portion of rural north Gloucestershire, extending as far as the edges of Gloucester itself and also Cheltenham, and has a present population of 94,884.

== Historical landmarks ==
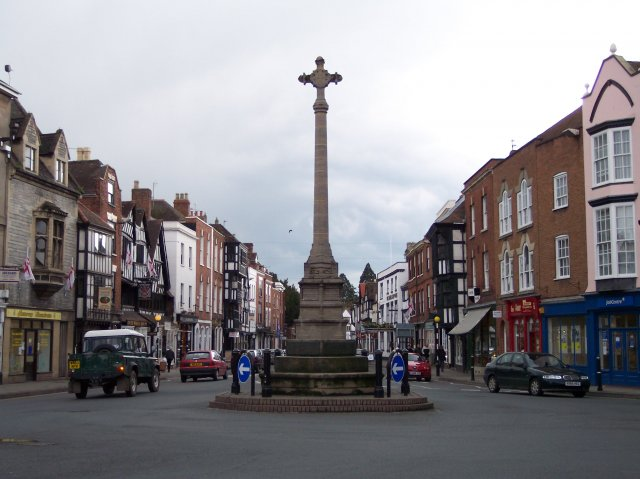
Tewkesbury War Memorial (The Cross), and High Street.

The town features many Medieval and Tudor buildings, but is most famous for Tewkesbury Abbey, a Norman abbey church.

=== The Abbey ===
The Abbey was built by the Normans and consecrated in the year 1121. Originally the Abbey formed part of a Benedictine monastery and was saved from the Dissolution of the Monasteries by King Henry VIII after being bought by the townspeople for the price of the lead on the roof to use as their parish church. Most of the monastery buildings, as well as the vineyards, were destroyed during this time. The Abbey Mill however still remains, resting upon the Mill Avon, a channel allegedly built by the monks. This channel represents one of the biggest projects in Tewkesbury's history, though the present weir dates only from the 1990s, replacing two sluice gates installed in the 1930s. The Abbey Mill is also sometimes known as "Abel Fletcher's Mill", but this is simply the name given to it in Dinah Craik's novel John Halifax, Gentleman, whose setting Norton Bury is based on Tewkesbury.

The abbey is thought to be the site of the place where the hermit Theoc once lived. The Romanesque arch and stained glass window has been restored. The monastery was founded by the Despensers as a family mausoleum, and the Despenser and Neville tombs are fine examples of small-scale late medieval stonework.

The tower is believed to be the largest Norman tower still in existence (though that at Norwich Cathedral is another strong contender). The tower once had a wooden spire which may have taken the total height of the building to as much as 260 feet, but this was blown off in a heavy storm on Easter Monday 1559; the present pinnacles and battlements were added in 1600 to give the tower a more "finished" look. The height to the top of the pinnacles is 148 feet (45 m). The abbey is thought to be the third largest church in Britain that is not a cathedral (after Westminster Abbey and Beverley Minster). From end to end it measures 331 feet (101 m), though prior to the destruction of the original Lady Chapel (also at the time of the dissolution), the total length was 375 feet (114 m). The abbey is a parish church, still used for daily services, and is believed to be the second-largest parish church in England, again, after Beverley Minster.

=== Pubs, inns and taverns ===
Tewkesbury claims Gloucestershire's oldest public house, the Black Bear, dating from 1308. The pub closed in 2017 and after undergoing renovation from 2019 to 2022, reopened in 2023. Other notable large hostelries are the Royal Hop Pole Hotel in Church Street (which has recently been converted into a part of the Wetherspoons pub chain with the discovery of a former medieval banqueting hall in the structure), mentioned in Charles Dickens' The Pickwick Papers, the Bell Hotel, a large half-timbered structure opposite the Abbey gateway, and the House of the Nodding Gables in the High Street.

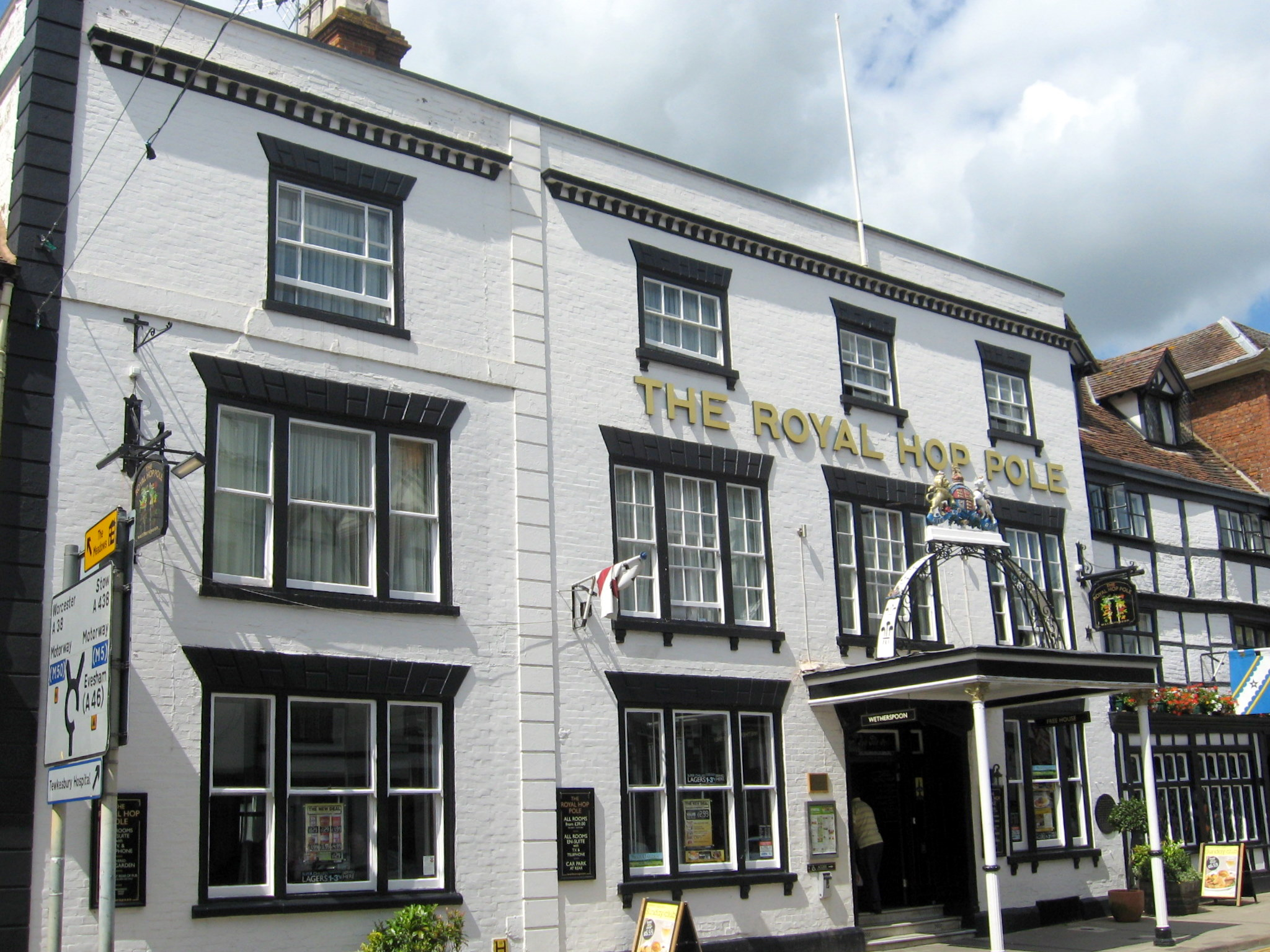
The Royal Hop Pole, mentioned in Charles Dickens' The Pickwick Papers

=== Around the Abbey ===
The Abbey Cottages, adjacent to Tewkesbury Abbey, were built between 1410 and 1412. They were restored 1967 to 1972 by the Abbey Lawn Trust, a building preservation charity. They house the John Moore Museum, residential homes and commercial offices. The John Moore Museum was established in 1980 in memory of the writer and naturalist, John Moore. The museum consists of three buildings: the main John Moore Museum, home to an extensive Natural History collection; the Merchant's House, restored to its Tudor appearance; and the Old Baptist Chapel. The Old Baptist Chapel, located off Church Street, is a timber-framed building, formally a medieval hall house dating to the 1480s. Sometime in the 17th century, it was converted for use as a Nonconformist meeting house. Including the original baptistery and pastor's room, the building is of significant historic interest. The building was restored to its 1720 appearance in the 1970s by Tewkesbury Borough Council. It was further renovated and interpreted in 2015 by the Abbey Lawn Trust and is used as a venue for a variety of cultural events. Behind the chapel is a small cemetery for those who were members of the congregation. This includes the grave of William Shakespeare-Hart, fifth great-grandnephew of William Shakespeare. The cemetery is managed by Tewkesbury Borough Council.

=== Along the river ===
Just to the west of the town is Thomas Telford's Mythe Bridge over the River Severn, a cast-iron structure with a 170 feet (52 m) span, opened in 1826. Tewkesbury's other notable bridge is the stone-built King John's Bridge over the Avon, commissioned by King John in the late 12th century as part of improvements to the main road from Gloucester to Worcester. Original stonework can still be seen on its north side; the bridge was widened in the 1950s to meet traffic requirements at the time.

The river was significant in the commercial development of the town. The large industrial flour mill site, built in 1865 stands near the confluence of the Avon and Severn rivers, where barges were used to transport goods. The mill, known as Healing's Mill (and previously owned by Allied Bakeries) closed for milling in 2006. The mill building facing the river is now a well-known "at risk" structure, and can be seen clearly to have sunk on one end of its foundations.

The Gloucestershire Water Rescue Centre, also known as Tewkesbury fire station, is a combined project between Severn Area Rescue Association (SARA) and Gloucestershire Fire and Rescue Service (GFRS).

Mythe Chapel, which was built in 1870, was deconsecrated in 1977.

== Governance ==
=== Modern governance ===
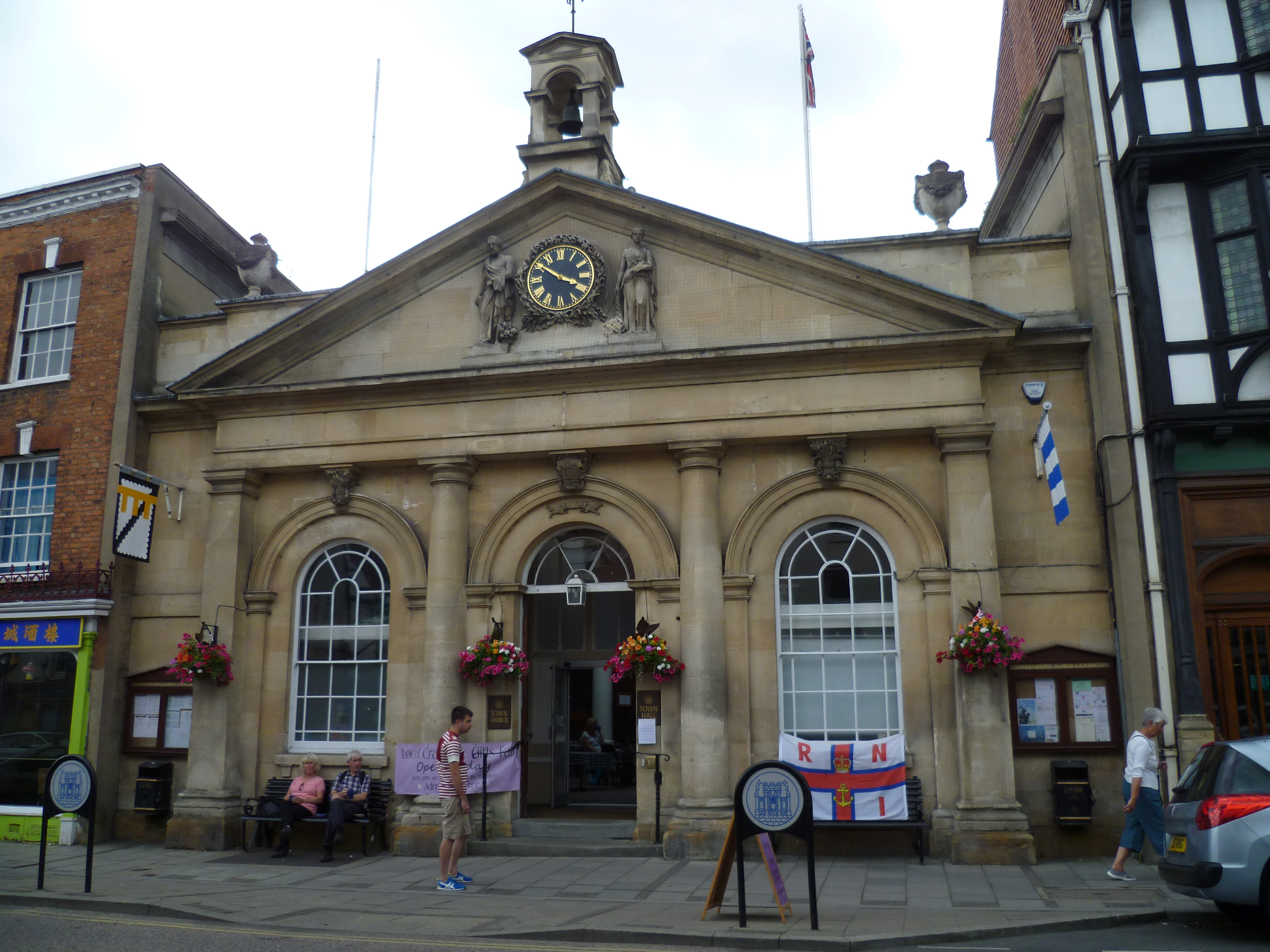
Tewkesbury Town Hall

Tewkesbury Town Council

Type
- Type: Parish Council

Leadership
- Mayor: Cllr Alan Hayes
- Deputy Mayor: Cllr Emma Ash
- Town Clerk and RFO: Mrs Debbie Hill

Structure
- Seats: 16 Councillors
- Independent: 16 / 16

Elections
- Voting system: Multiple non transferable vote
- Last election: 4 May 2023
- Next election: 6 May 2027

Meeting place
- Town Hall, 18 High Street, Tewkesbury, GL20 5AL

Website
- www.tewkesburytowncouncil.gov.uk

Tewkesbury Town Council (not to be confused with Tewkesbury Borough, which covers a wider area) has 16 members elected or co-opted from the three wards of Newtown, Tewkesbury North and Tewkesbury South to serve four year terms. The boundaries of these wards mirror the Tewkesbury Borough wards of Tewkesbury East, Tewkesbury North with Twyning, and Tewkesbury South. The Gloucestershire County Council divisions of Tewkesbury and Tewkesbury East are unchanged by the new ward boundaries at the Town and Borough Councils. Councillors were last elected in 2023, with all councillors sitting as independents. The Mayor of Tewkesbury, Councillor Alan Hayes, is the civic head of the council and chairs meetings of the full council. The council also appoints a Deputy Mayor who supports the Mayor in their duties and often succeeds to the office of Mayor in the following civic year. The council was formally established in 1974 following the dissolution of the municipal borough of Tewkesbury but continues to occupy Tewkesbury Town Hall and maintains the same civic role within the Town.

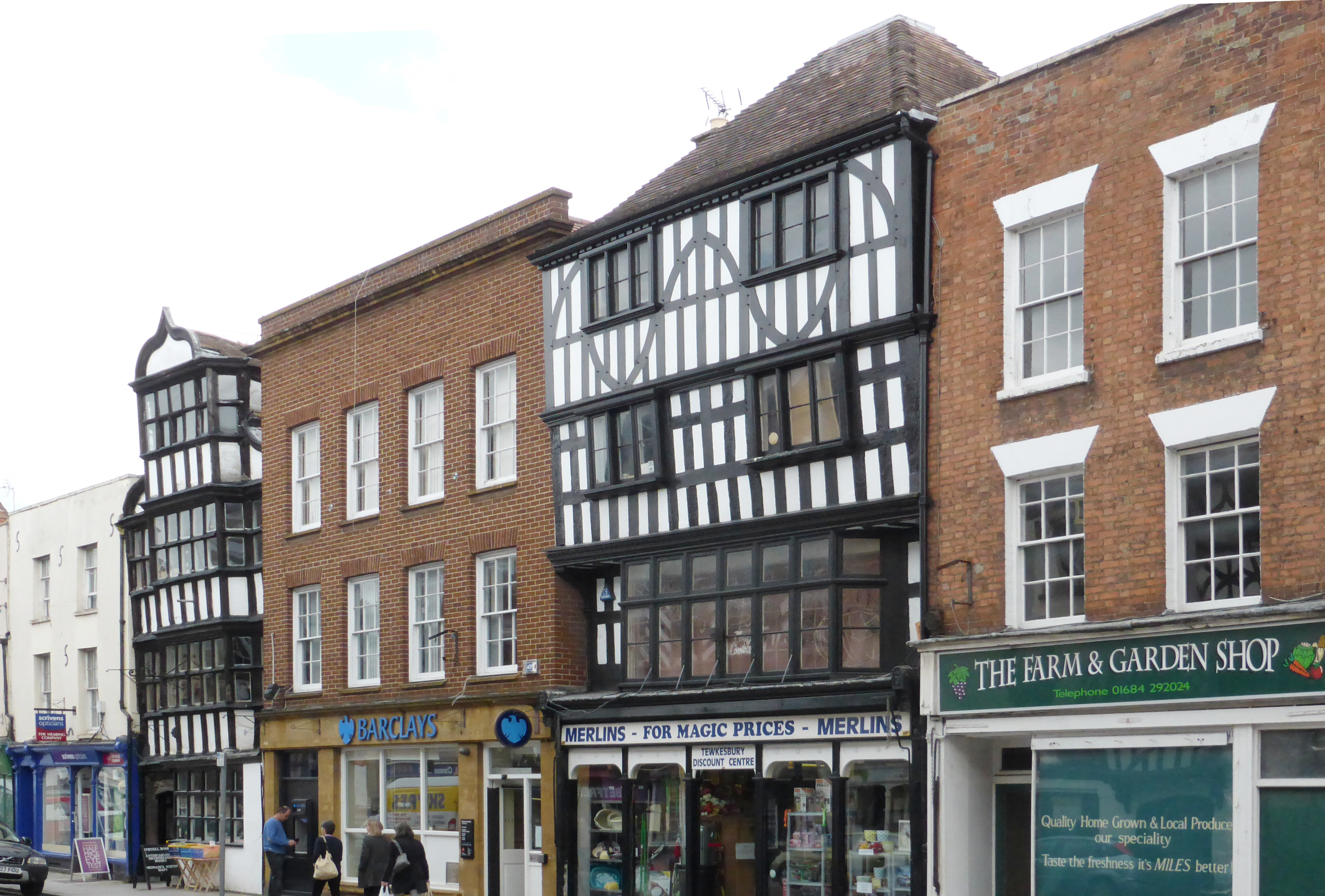
Black and white buildings in Tewkesbury High Street. The left-hand one was built c.1510, with the exterior refronted in c.1650.

Tewkesbury is also covered by Tewkesbury Borough Council (district level) and Gloucestershire County Council. Tewkesbury is part of the wider Tewkesbury constituency for elections to the House of Commons. Prior to Brexit in 2020, it was represented in the European Parliament as part of the South West England constituency in the European Parliament.

Through the provisions of the Local Government Act 1972, a new District Council was created comprising the pre-1974 Tewkesbury Borough, Cheltenham Rural District and parts of Gloucester Rural District. In May 1973 a joint committee of the predecessor Councils recommended that a new Royal Charter be applied for. This Royal Charter conferring Borough Status was granted on 27 February 1973 and took effect on 1 April 1974. By virtue of this Charter the Borough appoint a Mayor and Deputy Mayor which results in there being two Mayors covering Tewkesbury at different level of government. The Borough Mayor being the first citizen of Tewkesbury Borough and the Town Mayor being the first citizen of the Town itself.

=== Historical governance and town mayoralty ===
The following table lists the Mayors of Tewkesbury between 1836 and 1973. After 1973 both Tewkesbury Borough and Tewkesbury Town Council have appointed the Borough Mayor and Town Mayor respectively. The date of the Mayors Election changed from November to May in 1947/48 during the term of office of J.O. Martin.

Table 1: Tewkesbury Mayors between 1836 and 1973.
| Years | Mayor |
|---|---|
| 1836 | J.B. Lewis |
| 1837 | C. Porter |
| 1838 | S. Healing |
| 1839 | C. Porter |
| 1840 | R.Phelps |
| 1841 | C. Porter |
| 1842 | J. Packer |
| 1843 | B. Trotter |
| 1844 | J. Stevenson |
| 1845 | I. Gregory |
| 1846 | J. Richards |
| 1847 | H.P. Strickland |
| 1848 | H.E. Strickland |
| 1849 | N. Chandler |
| 1850 | N. Chandler |
| 1851 | N. Chandler |
| 1852 | W.L. Chandler |
| 1853 | W.L. Chandler |
| 1854 | H. Brown |
| 1855 | H. Brown |
| 1856 | S. Healing |
| 1857 | G. Banaster |
| 1858 | F.J. Prior |
| 1859 | T. Weaver. |
| 1860 | F.J. Price |
| 1861 | S. Hitch |
| 1862 | S. Hitch |
| 1863 | S. Hitch |
| 1864 | W. Allard |
| 1865 | G. Blizard |
| 1866 | J.F. Prosser |
| 1867 | J.F. Prosser |
| 1868 | G. Blizard |
| 1869 | I. Nind |
| 1870 | J. Hanford |
| 1871 | W.G. Healing |
| 1872 | J.F. Prosser |
| 1873 | F. Thomas |
| 1874 | J.F. Prosser |
| 1875 | A. Healing |
| 1876 | J.H. Boughton |
| 1877 | J.F. Prosser |
| 1878 | J.H. Boughton |
| 1879 | J.F. Prosser |
| 1880 | J.F. Prosser |
| 1881 | W.G. Healing |
| 1882 | M.C. Smart |
| 1883 | J.H. Boughton |
| 1884 | J.H. Boughton |
| 1885 | J.H. Boughton |
| 1886 | B.T. Moore |
| 1887 | B.T. Moore |
| 1888 | E. Thomas |
| 1889 | E. Thomas |
| 1890 | T. Collins |
| 1891 | M.C. Smart |
| 1892 | T. Collins |
| 1893 | T. Collins |
| 1894 | T. Collins |
| 1895 | T. Collins |
| 1896 | T.W. Moore |
| 1897 | A. Baker |
| 1898 | A. Baker |
| 1899 | W.E. Hayward |
| 1900 | T.W. Moore |
| 1901 | T.W. Moore |
| 1902 | C.C. Moore |
| 1903 | P.A. Pike |
| 1904 | L. Jones |
| 1905 | G.M. Rice |
| 1906 | J. Willis |
| 1907 | J. Willis |
| 1908 | G.C. Bayliss |
| 1909 | F.W. Godfrey |
| 1910 | A. Baker |
| 1911 | A. Baker |
| 1912 | W.H. Hayward |
| 1913 | W.H. Hayward |
| 1914 | G. Hone |
| 1915 | H. Bishop |
| 1916 | H. Bishop |
| 1917 | C.W. Jones |
| 1918 | A. Baker |
| 1919 | A. Baker |
| 1920 | W.T. Boughton |
| 1921 | W.T. Boughton |
| 1922 | W.T. Boughton |
| 1923 | G.P. Howell |
| 1924 | G.P. Howell |
| 1925 | W.T. Boughton |
| 1926 | W.T. Boughton |
| 1927 | W.T. Boughton |
| 1928 | W.T. Boughton |
| 1929 | G.P. Howell |
| 1930 | L.L. Stroud |
| 1931 | R.A. Gaze |
| 1932 | R.A. Gaze |
| 1933 | R.A. Gaze |
| 1934 | R.A. Gaze |
| 1935 | S.C.J. Moulder |
| 1936 | S.C.J. Moulder |
| 1937 | R.A. Gaze |
| 1938 | R.A. Gaze |
| 1939 | R.A. Gaze |
| 1940 | R.A. Gaze |
| 1941 | Rev. H.G. Brown |
| 1942 | Rev. H.G. Brown |
| 1943 | Rev. H.G. Brown |
| 1944 | Rev. H.G. Brown |
| 1945 | H. Crouch |
| 1946 | J.O. Martin |
| 1947 | J.O. Martin |
| 1948 | J.O. Martin |
| 1949 | F.H. Knight |
| 1950 | F.H. Knight |
| 1951 | F.H. Knight |
| 1952 | T.G. Bannister |
| 1953 | T.G. Bannister |
| 1954 | T.G. Bannister |
| 1955 | T.G. Bannister |
| 1956 | W. Bettany |
| 1957 | F.H. Knight |
| 1958 | W.E. Lane |
| 1959 | W.E. Lane |
| 1960 | H.O. Workman |
| 1961 | H.O. Workman |
| 1962 | L.G. Marston |
| 1963 | L.G. Marston |
| 1964 | P.K. Holding |
| 1965 | P.K. Holding |
| 1966 | G.S. Brown |
| 1967 | G.M. Workman |
| 1968 | J.R. Griffiths |
| 1969 | G.P. Long |
| 1970 | L.A. Webster |
| 1971 | L.A. Webster |
| 1972 | M.R. Shepard |
| 1973 | F.J.O. Martin |

== Transport ==
=== Railways ===
Tewkesbury is served by Ashchurch for Tewkesbury railway station, located 2 miles (3.2 km) east of the town centre. It is served by Great Western Railway services primarily operating between Worcester Foregate Street and Bristol Temple Meads with some services operating to London Paddington, Salisbury and Great Malvern. Limited CrossCountry services from Cardiff to Nottingham and Stansted also call.

Tewkesbury railway station used to serve the town. It was opened by the Birmingham & Gloucester Railway in 1840 and was sited in the High Street. It was replaced in 1864 by a new station built for the Tewkesbury & Malvern Railway; this closed on 14 August 1961, when the Ashchurch to Upton-on-Severn passenger service was withdrawn by British Railways (through trains to Great Malvern had ceased previously in December 1952). Freight traffic continued until final closure in December 1964. Removal of most of the railway embankment east of Mythe Road began in 2013 to aid flood prevention in the town taking about six months to complete.

=== Roads ===
Tewkesbury is served by the M5 and M50 motorways and the A38, A438 and A46 trunk roads. Congestion on the A46 around Ashchurch and junction 9 of the M5 is being addressed through a series of road works, which started in 2014.

=== Buses ===
A network of bus services serve the town and surrounding district, operated predominantly by Stagecoach West. Services run to Cheltenham, Gloucester, Bishop's Cleeve while Evesham can be reached using Diamond Bus service 540 which runs up to every 30 minutes Mondays to Saturdays. Buses run frequently from the town centre to Ashchurch railway station.

=== Cycling ===
In Newtown, 10 per cent of all work trips are made by bicycle. There are some bicycle paths in the built-up-area of Tewkesbury.

== Culture ==
- Roses Theatre combines an arthouse cinema and a live performance venue. The Roses Theatre is where comedian Eric Morecambe collapsed after a charity performance in May 1984. He died hours later in Cheltenham General Hospital. A conference/changing room was later named after him.
- Battle of Tewkesbury, mentioned in Shakespeare's play Richard III.
- Raymond Priestley, geologist on Robert Falcon Scott's expedition to the South Pole, left one of the sleds, used on that expedition, to the former Tewkesbury Grammar School (c. 1576 – 1972). It is now kept in the Tewkesbury School's Humanities building.
- Tewkesbury mustard, a blend of mustard and horseradish, made the town famous in the 17th century and is again being manufactured. The mustard was mentioned in some of Shakespeare's works.

=== Festivals and fairs ===
- Since 2005, an annual Food and Drink Festival has been held, in or near the Abbey grounds.
- On the second full weekend of July the town hosts Tewkesbury Medieval Festival. Thousands of re-enactors travel to the town from around the world to re-enact the Battle of Tewkesbury near to the original battle site. The festival includes a "living history" recreation of a medieval encampment, games, food and a large fair where re-enactment clothing, furniture and weaponry can be purchased. In 2008 the festival celebrated its 25th anniversary. It has been described by Footprint Travel Guides as one of the "ten most bizarre festivals" in the country.
- In July the Water Festival takes place with events on the river and the banks including an evening procession of lit boats ending with a firework display. The festival started in 1996 but its future is now in question due to funding issues and the 2006 event was much reduced in scale. The event was cancelled in 2007 as it coincided with the Summer 2007 Flood (it went ahead later in the year). The event was scheduled for 2008 on Saturday, 20 September, but was again cancelled due to flooding in the weeks prior to the event.
- On 9 and 10 October, the town holds the annual mop fair. Originally a hiring fair where people came to seek employment, the event is now a large travelling funfair taking over much of the centre of town. The fair itself is also an underlining point of Tewkesbury's industrial past, as Walker Gallopers were produced in the area by Walkers in the early 20th century. The fair is organised by The Showmen's Guild of Great Britain (Western Section). The fair is never held on a Sunday.
- Every year at the end of July and into August the Abbey hosts a festival of liturgical music entitled Musica Deo Sacra (Music Sacred to God).

== Local media ==
Local news and television programmes are provided by BBC West Midlands and ITV Central. Television signals are received from the Ridge Hill TV transmitter. However, BBC West and ITV West Country are also received through cable and satellite television such as Freesat and Sky.

Local radio stations are BBC Radio Gloucestershire on 104.7 FM, Greatest Hits Radio South West on 107.5 FM, Heart West on 102.4 FM and Gloucester FM on 96.6 FM.

The town is served by these local newspapers:

- Gloucestershire Echo
- Evesham Journal.

== Cultural references ==
- Victorian author Dinah Craik (1826–1887) visited Tewkesbury in 1852, and later set her most famous work John Halifax, Gentleman (pub. 1857) in the town, calling it "Norton Bury". There is a Craik House on Church Street, but Craik never lived there and has no other connection with Tewkesbury. Despite this, there is a memorial to her in the Abbey's south transept.
- Author John Moore (1907–1967) was born and lived in Tewkesbury. He set his novel Portrait of Elmbury (pub. 1945) as a "fictionalised biography" of Tewkesbury, the town being the "Elmbury" of the book. Another of his books, Brensham Village (published in 1946) used nearby Bredon as its basis. A local museum has been named after him.
- A.E. Housman's A Shropshire Lad also mentions Tewkesbury, as well as nearby Bredon Hill, even though neither place is in Shropshire.
- Four episodes of the children's TV programme Rosie and Jim, aired in 1990 and 1991, are set in the town. The Abbey and Mythe Water Treatment Works are featured prominently in an episode each.
- The opening scene of the 1995 film version of Richard III takes place at the field headquarters of King Henry's army at Tewkesbury.
- Two episodes of the BBC show Antiques Roadshow series 39 are set on the Abbey grounds. One episode features a rare 18th-century dress which was valued at £40,000.
- The 2020 film Enola Holmes features the disappearance of the fictional Viscount Earnest Tewkesbury, Marquess of Basilwether, played by actor Louis Partridge.
- In 1892, Gustav Holst wrote a comic opera entitled Lansdown Castle or The Sorcerer of Tewkesbury.

== Notable people ==
- John Barston – English writer and law civic figure – born Tewkesbury c. 1545.
- Barbara Cartland – romance author – grew up in Tewkesbury in the 1910s.
- Robert Harold Compton – South African botanist – born Tewkesbury 1886.
- Henry Disston – American industrialist – born Tewkesbury 1819.
- Anna Ford – newsreader and TV presenter – born Tewkesbury 1943.
- Henry Green – author – born Tewkesbury 1905.
- Kathleen Hawkins - New Zealand poet – born Tewkesbury 1883.
- Alfred Jones – cricketer – born Tewkesbury 1900.
- John Moore – writer – born Tewkesbury 1907.
- Mel Nicholls – Paralympic wheelchair racer.
- Raymond Priestley – Antarctic explorer – born Tewkesbury 1886.
- Eunice Spry – foster mother convicted of child abuse in 2007 – lived in Tewkesbury.
- Oswald Wardell-Yerburgh – vicar – 1899 to 1913.

== Sports and recreation ==
- Tewkesbury has one of the 471 King George's Fields as its recreation ground.
- The football club, Tewkesbury Town FC have three men's teams in the Saturday Cheltenham Leagues, two teams in the Evesham Birdseye Sunday Leagues, a Veterans team for ages 35+ in the Gloucestershire North County League and hold weekly training sessions for Ladies in preparation for starting a team in the 2014/15 season. They are holders of the Gloucestershire County Cup as well as the Evesham Bluck cup, Pershore Hospital cup, are Evesham League Division 3 Champions and are the Evesham Leagues Team of the Year 2012/13.
- The cricket team, Tewkesbury Cricket Club 1st XI play in the Glos/wilts Division of the West of England Premier League.
- The rugby team, Tewkesbury RFC, plays Rugby Union in Gloucestershire Division One and has gained promotion to Gloucester Division Premiership
- The running club, Tewkesbury AC compete in local, national and international running events.
- Cheltenham College Boathouse is situated at Lower Lode
- Facilities at Tewkesbury School are used as a public sports centre for swimming, gym, squash and other sports.
- The Tewkesbury lawn green Bowling Club plays in the Gloucestershire men's and ladies leagues.
- The Tewkesbury swimming club is in Tewkesbury and trains at the Leisure Centre near the Tewkesbury Abbey, and at the Tewkesbury School swimming pool.

== Twin town ==
Tewkesbury Borough is twinned with Miesbach in Bavaria, Germany. Tewkesbury Town has had a sister city relationship twinned with Tewksbury Township, New Jersey, United States of America since 2003 and also has ties with Stoneham-et-Tewkesbury, Quebec, Canada. During the 1990s the relationship between the town of Tewkesbury, Gloucestershire and Tewksbury, Massachusetts was strengthened and the possibility of a formal twinning was investigated. A formal twinning arrangement between the two towns was not progressed during the 1990s although a link was maintained during this time. The relationship between these two towns resulted in the placing of the Miko Kaufman sculpture called Touching Souls at Tewkesbury Abbey.
