= Hugh Sherwood Cordery =

New Zealand customs official

Hugh Sherwood Cordery (27 March 1880 – 24 October 1973) was a New Zealand customs official. He was born in Malvern Wells, Worcestershire, England.
