= Upper Welland =

Settlement in Worcestershire, United Kingdom

Coordinates: 52.065882°N 2.325304°W

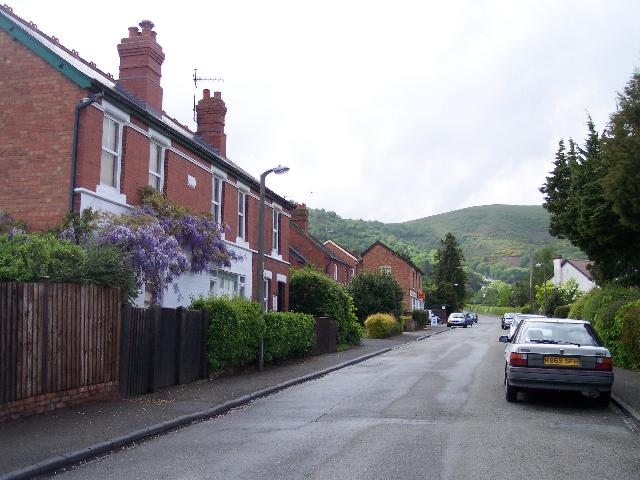
- Upper Welland

- Location within Worcestershire
- OS grid reference: SO777408
- Civil parish: Malvern Wells
- District: Malvern Hills
- Shire county: Worcestershire
- Region: West Midlands
- Country: England
- Sovereign state: United Kingdom
- Post town: MALVERN
- Postcode district: WR14
- Police: West Mercia
- Fire: Hereford and Worcester
- Ambulance: West Midlands
- UK Parliament: West Worcestershire

Upper Welland is a small settled area within the civil parish of Malvern Wells, in Worcestershire, England. Lying close to the county boundaries of Herefordshire.It was formed when the upper part of Welland parish joined the newly created Malvern Hills Urban District. Welland Parish once stretched to the ridge of the Malvern Hills. Its average elevation is 115 metres above the sea level.
