= Welland, Worcestershire =

Village in Worcestershire, England

Coordinates: 52.05811°N 2.297718°W

Welland
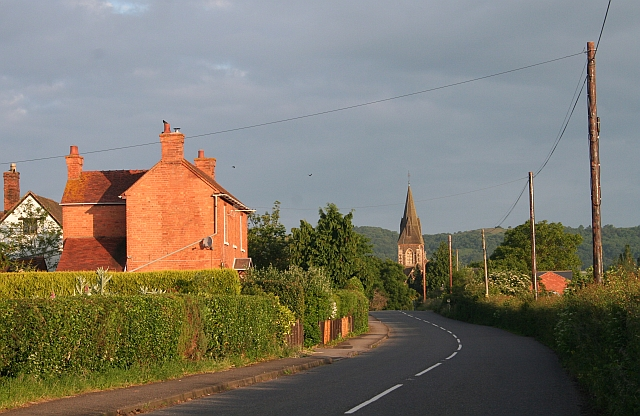
- Drake Street, Welland

- Location within Worcestershire
- OS grid reference: SO797399
- Civil parish: Welland
- District: Malvern Hills
- Shire county: Worcestershire
- Region: West Midlands
- Country: England
- Sovereign state: United Kingdom
- Post town: MALVERN
- Postcode district: WR13
- Police: West Mercia
- Fire: Hereford and Worcester
- Ambulance: West Midlands
- UK Parliament: West Worcestershire

Welland is a village and civil parish in the administrative district of Malvern Hills in the county of Worcestershire, England. It has a combined parish council with Little Malvern, with 9 of the 11 councillors. It is about 6 miles (9.7 km) from the town of Malvern, 15 miles from the city of Worcester, and 18 miles from the city of Gloucester. It is surrounded by farms and common land, and is part of the informal region referred to as The Malverns.

Welland is a crossroads village in south Worcestershire situated almost mid-way on a minor alternative route between the cities of Worcester and Gloucester. The village is adjacent to Castlemorton Common and lies beneath the southern end of the Malvern Hills. Its main event is the Welland Steam Rally that takes place each year during the last weekend of July drawing enthusiasts, steam engines, historic vehicles, a steam carnival and militaria to the village. Other points of interest include its view of the entire range of the Malvern Hills, and its quiet rights of way.

At the centre of the village community is the village hall, Welland Primary School founded in 1876 with a capacity for up to 150 children, and St James Church.

The village hall is regularly used for many community activities including an arts & crafts club, over 60's club, local branch of the W.I., dancing, and short mat bowls. It also houses a library with computers offering free public access. Welland Football Club, who play their home games at The Hill Centre, Upton-on-Severn, are members of the Herefordshire League premier division; Welland Reserves play in the Cheltenham League division two, with home games at The Pavilion, Welland.

Around 2001 St. James' Church came very near to closing but due to the initiative of a small team led by a churchwarden, it has been totally transformed and is now used virtually every day for various activities besides regular worship. Concerts and drama events are regularly held and attract large audiences.

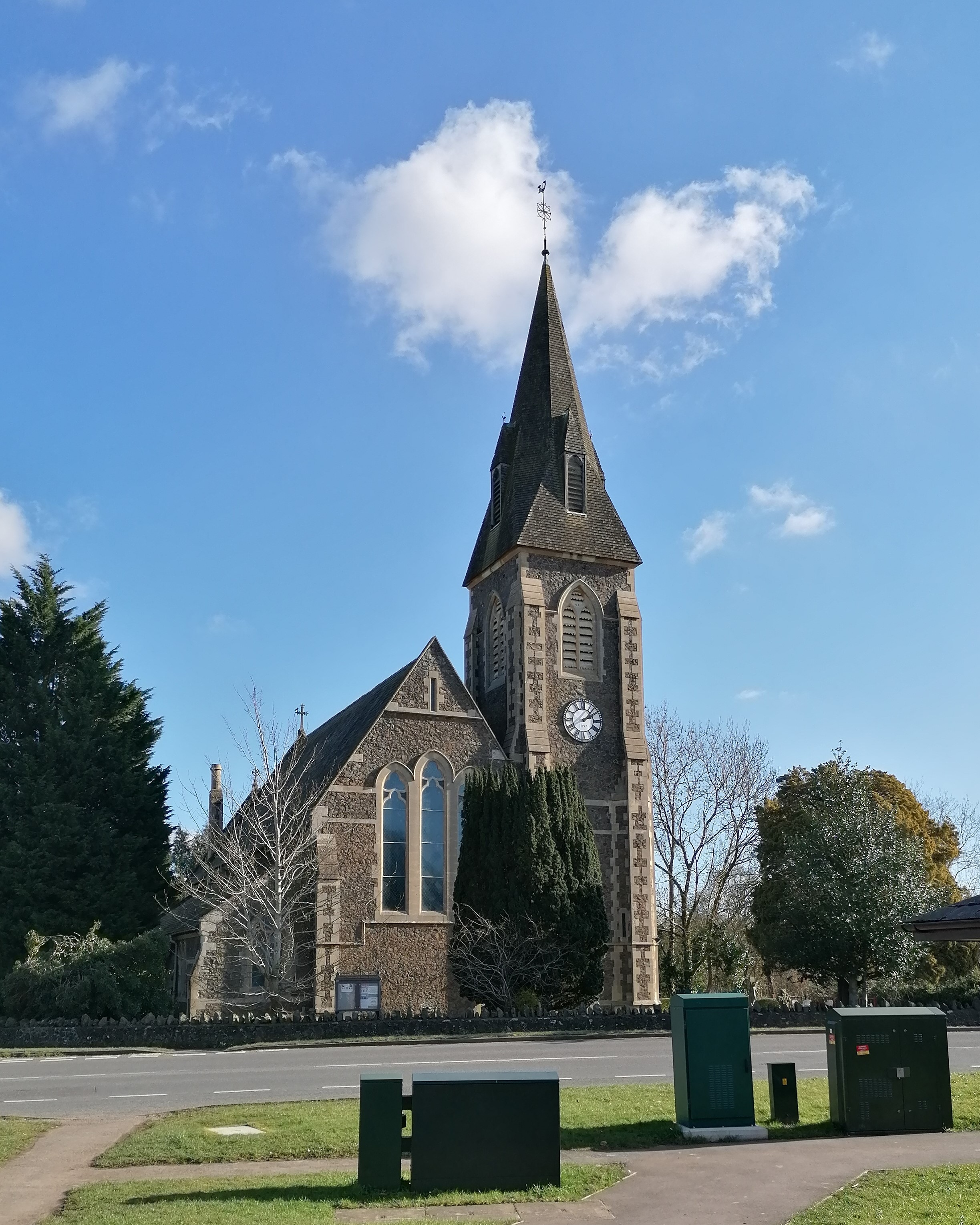
View from west of St James' church, Welland

The settlement of Upper Welland falls under the civil parish of Malvern Wells.

== History ==
Evidence for early human activity in Welland is sparse. Prehistoric occupation is represented by a Neolithic polished stone axe found at Hill Court Farm, and possible Romano-British settlement has been identified from the place names 'Burnt Ground' and 'Burn Piece'.

During the early middle ages Welland lay within the Hundred of Oswaldslow. The place name Welland originates in this period, and is thought to mean 'Wēna’s land'. In 889 Welland was acquired by the Bishop of Worcester after a grant of land from Ealdorman Athulf, who had inherited the estate from the Mercian king Coenwulf. By the late ninth century Welland was attached to the Bishop's larger estate at Bredon, and consequently does not appear as an independent estate in the Domesday Book of 1086.
