= Ashchurch =

Village in Gloucestershire, England

Coordinates: 51°59′52″N 02°06′27″W

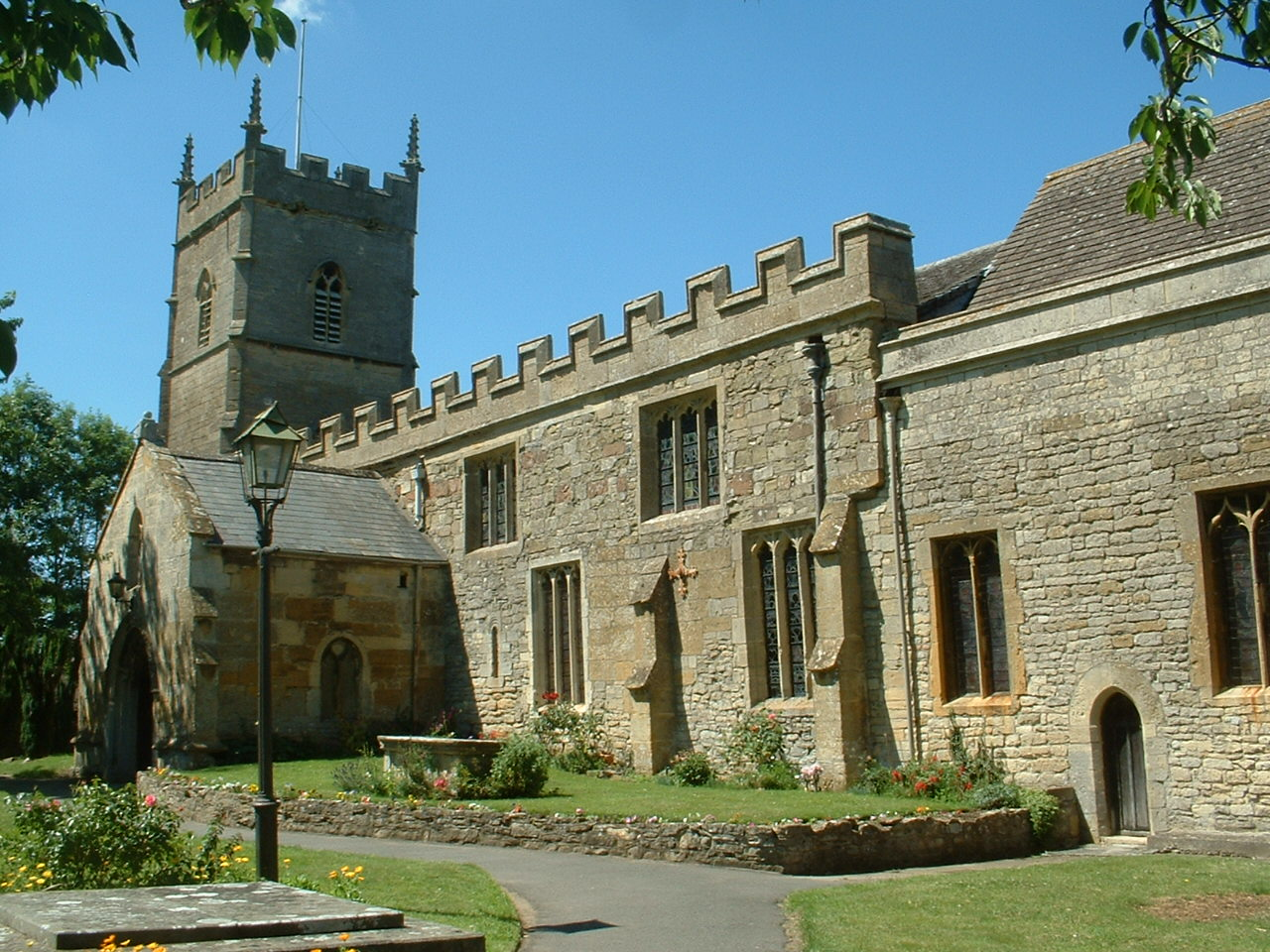
- Church of St. Nicholas

- Location within Gloucestershire
- Population: 6,064 (2001 census)
- OS grid reference: SO9233
- Civil parish: Ashchurch Rural
- District: Tewkesbury
- Shire county: Gloucestershire
- Region: South West
- Country: England
- Sovereign state: United Kingdom
- Post town: TEWKESBURY
- Postcode district: GL20
- Dialling code: 01684
- Police: Gloucestershire
- Fire: Gloucestershire
- Ambulance: South Western

Ashchurch is a village and former civil parish, now in the parish of Ashchurch Rural, in the Tewkesbury district, in the county of Gloucestershire, England, 2 miles (3.2 km) east of the town of Tewkesbury, 11 mi (18 km) southwest of Evesham, 10 mi (16 km) north of Cheltenham, 13 mi (21 km) north-north-east of Gloucester and 10 mi (16 km) south of Pershore.

== History ==
The toponym is first recorded in 1287, in the form Asschirche, meaning "church near the ash-tree".

In the Middle Ages Ashchurch was part of the parish of Tewkesbury, but after the dissolution of the monasteries in the 16th century became a separate parish. It was a large parish, including the village of Ashchurch and the settlements of Northway, Aston Cross, Aston on Carrant, Pamington and Natton. The parish became a civil parish in 1866. The parish once extended even further west to include the area called Newtown, but this was transferred to Tewkesbury in 1931. From 1935 until 1 April 1974, Ashchurch was part of the Cheltenham Rural District, then was incorporated into the new Tewkesbury district.

At the 2001 UK census the parish had a population of 6,064. Ashchurch civil parish was abolished on 1 April 2008 when its area was divided between the new civil parishes of Northway and Ashchurch Rural.

== Railway ==
The village is served by Ashchurch for Tewkesbury railway station on the Birmingham to Bristol main line, opened by the Birmingham and Gloucester Railway on 24 June 1840, later a part of the Midland Railway and later still the LMS. This was once a railway centre of some importance, as it was the junction for two branches, one each side of the main line:

- The Evesham line served Evesham, Alcester and Redditch before re-joining the main line at Barnt Green, near Bromsgrove. This line closed between Evesham and Redditch on 15 October 1962 due to poor condition of the track, while Ashchurch to Evesham followed on 17 June 1963.
- The line to Tewkesbury, Upton-upon-Severn and Malvern, closed beyond Upton on 1 December 1952, Ashchurch to Upton on Severn following on 14 August 1961. At this time Ashchurch station was renamed Ashchurch for Tewkesbury, but closed in November 1971. It reopened on 1 June 1997. There used to be a connecting curve linking the two branches, crossing the main line on the level just north of the station, creating a layout which may have been unique in Britain, but this curve closed in December 1957. There was an extensive goods yard to the south, and to the north-west a large grain store.

The remains of the old line are still apparent, with much of its infrastructure in existence. The old connecting curve and the two branches it served can clearly be traced on a map, with much of the Ashchurch to Tewkesbury line now being used as a Segregated Cycle Path and footpath.

== Road ==
The village is connected to Tewkesbury via the A46 road and Evesham. The village is also east of Junction 9 (known as Ashchurch Interchange) of the M5 Motorway. Ashchurch is also connected to Cheltenham and Bishops Cleeve via both the M5 and A435 road.

== MOD Ashchurch ==
DE&S Ashchurch, known locally as "Ashchurch Camp", is the UK MOD's primary vehicle storage and distribution site for all types of armoured and soft skinned vehicles, together with Royal Engineer bridges, boats and construction plant. The Centre is the only vehicle depot in the UK using Controlled Humidity Environments (CHE) for long-term vehicle storage.

In March 2012, the UK MOD's Defence Infrastructure Organisation, confirmed its intention to consult publicly on proposals to redevelop 'MOD Ashchurch' for creation of a sustainable mixed use development, likely to include new homes, community and local retail facilities, primary school, employment uses and open space. However, this was later reversed, and the site will remain open for the foreseeable future.
