= River Swilgate =

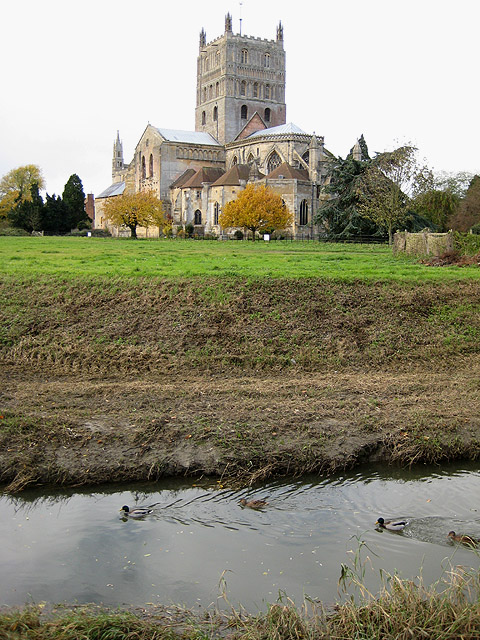
- The Swilgate flows past Tewkesbury Abbey.

- Location within Gloucestershire

Location
- Country: England
- Counties: Gloucestershire

Physical characteristics
- Mouth
  - location: River Avon
  - coordinates: 51.9888°N 2.1657°W

The River Swilgate is a small river that flows through Gloucestershire, England.

It is formed by the confluence at Elmstone Hardwicke of the Hyde Brook which flows westwards from Bishop's Cleeve, and Wymans Brook that flows northwest through Cheltenham. The Swilgate flows northwest and north to Tewkesbury where it joins the River Avon close to the latter's confluence with the Severn.

The New Statesman described "The Swilgate, the tributary of the Avon that runs round the southern edge of the town" as an example of flooding as a result of climate change.
