= Ashchurch for Tewkesbury railway station =

Railway station in Ashchurch, Gloucestershire, England

Coordinates: 51.999°N 2.109°W

Ashchurch for Tewkesbury
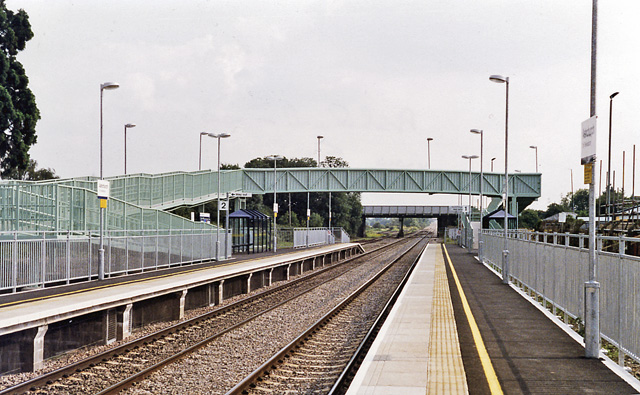

General information
- Location: Ashchurch, Tewkesbury; England
- Grid reference: SO926333
- Manager: Great Western Railway
- Platforms: 2

Other information
- Station code: ASC
- Classification: DfT category F2

History
- Original company: Birmingham and Gloucester Railway
- Pre-grouping: Midland Railway
- Post-grouping: London, Midland and Scottish Railway

Key dates
- 24 June 1840: Opened as Ashchurch
- 15 November 1971: Station closed
- 1 June 1997: Reopened as Ashchurch for Tewkesbury

Passengers
- 2020/21: ▼17,576
- 2021/22: ▲68,810
- 2022/23: ▲81,830
- 2023/24: ▲93,894
- 2024/25: ▲108,740
- 2025/26: ▲128,240
Location
Notes
- Passenger statistics from the Office of Rail and Road

Ashchurch for Tewkesbury is a railway station on the main Bristol–Birmingham main line, serving the market town of Tewkesbury and the village of Ashchurch in Gloucestershire, England. It is located less than 1/4 mile (400 m) from junction 9 of the M5 motorway. Originally opened in 1840 but closed in 1971, the station was reopened on 1 June 1997 by Railtrack. There are regular bus connections from the station to Tewkesbury town centre, Gloucester and Cheltenham.

== History ==
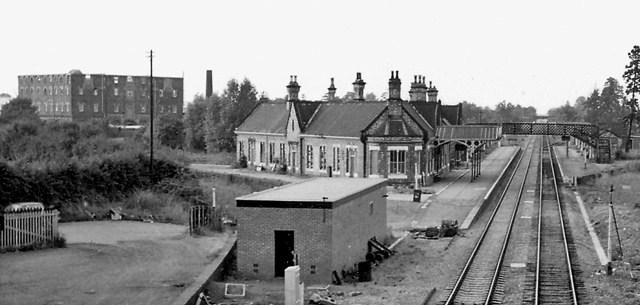
The station looking north in 1969

The original Ashchurch station was a stop on the Birmingham and Gloucester Railway, authorised in 1836, and whose central section from Bromsgrove to Cheltenham, including Ashchurch, was opened on 24 June 1840 (the line was open throughout a few months later). It subsequently became part of the Midland Railway, later the London, Midland and Scottish Railway during the Grouping of 1923, and finally passed to the London Midland Region of British Railways on nationalisation in 1948. It was then closed by the British Railways Board in November 1971.

Two fatal accidents occurred near the station prior to its original closure – the first on 8 January 1929 and the second forty years later on 8 March 1969.

== Description ==
The station reopened by Railtrack on 1 June 1997, on the site of the earlier station which had lain derelict for 26 years. Only one small ruined red-brick shed remains of the original station buildings. In the post-war period, the station had been used both for passenger services and for cargo loading for the nearby army base; a number of cargo sidings still exist nearby. Ashchurch was once a railway centre of some importance; it was the junction for two branches, one each side of the main line:

- The Evesham loop line, which was a lengthy loop serving Evesham, Alcester and Redditch, re-joining the main line at Barnt Green, near Bromsgrove. This line closed between Evesham and Redditch on 1 October 1962, due to the poor track condition, while Ashchurch to Evesham followed on 17 June 1963 (Redditch to Barnt Green remains open on the electrified Birmingham suburban network). A short portion of this route remains intact today to serve the nearby British Army base.
- The line to Tewkesbury, Upton-on-Severn and Great Malvern, which was closed beyond Upton on 1 December 1952; the Ashchurch to Upton section followed on 14 August 1961.

At this time, Ashchurch station was then renamed to Ashchurch for Tewkesbury, only for it to be also closed in 1971 having been unstaffed since 14 September 1970. The once sizeable goods yard here had previously closed on 1 June 1964, though MOD traffic continued to be handled. The buildings were demolished in June 1972; the main line platforms and footbridge were removed early in 1974. There used to be a connecting curve linking the two branches; it crossed the main line on the level just north of the station and created a layout which may have been unique in Britain, but this curve closed in December 1957. There was an extensive goods yard to the south and a large grain store to the north west.

The remains of the old lines are still apparent, with much of its infrastructure (such as bridges) still in existence. The old connecting curve and the two branches it served can clearly be traced on a map. With much of the Ashchurch to Tewkesbury line now being used as a footpath, this section proved valuable during the 2007 United Kingdom floods as it was the only dry route into and out of Tewkesbury at the time. Work to remove this embankment began in 2013, as it has claimed that its removal will reduce the scale of flooding in the area.

When reopened in 1997, there were considerably more northbound services, with many CrossCountry or former Central Trains services from Cardiff calling there. However, in the early 2000s, these services were withdrawn, reducing the usefulness of the station. Passengers wishing to travel to Birmingham usually had to travel south to Cheltenham Spa, change onto a northbound train, then return northwards, passing through Ashchurch for Tewkesbury without stopping. From December 2006, some peak time services to and from Birmingham were reintroduced. However, from December 2008, CrossCountry cut the service on weekdays from 7 to 4 northbound services and from 4 (5 on Fridays) to 2 southbound services.

== Facilities ==
The station is unstaffed, so tickets must be purchased at the ticket machines or on-line. A push button computerised service provides real-time next train announcements. There is a large car park, situated adjacent to the northbound (western) platform, with 73 spaces. There are 36 bicycle racks.

Access to the southbound (eastern) platform is by a ramped footbridge over the lines; this includes wheelchair access. The A46 road bridge does not provide access to both platforms.

Bus connections can be accessed in the car park on the west side of the station; from here, Stagecoach West provides services 41 and 42 depart to Cheltenham, via Tewkesbury, with route 71 departing to Gloucester.

== Services ==
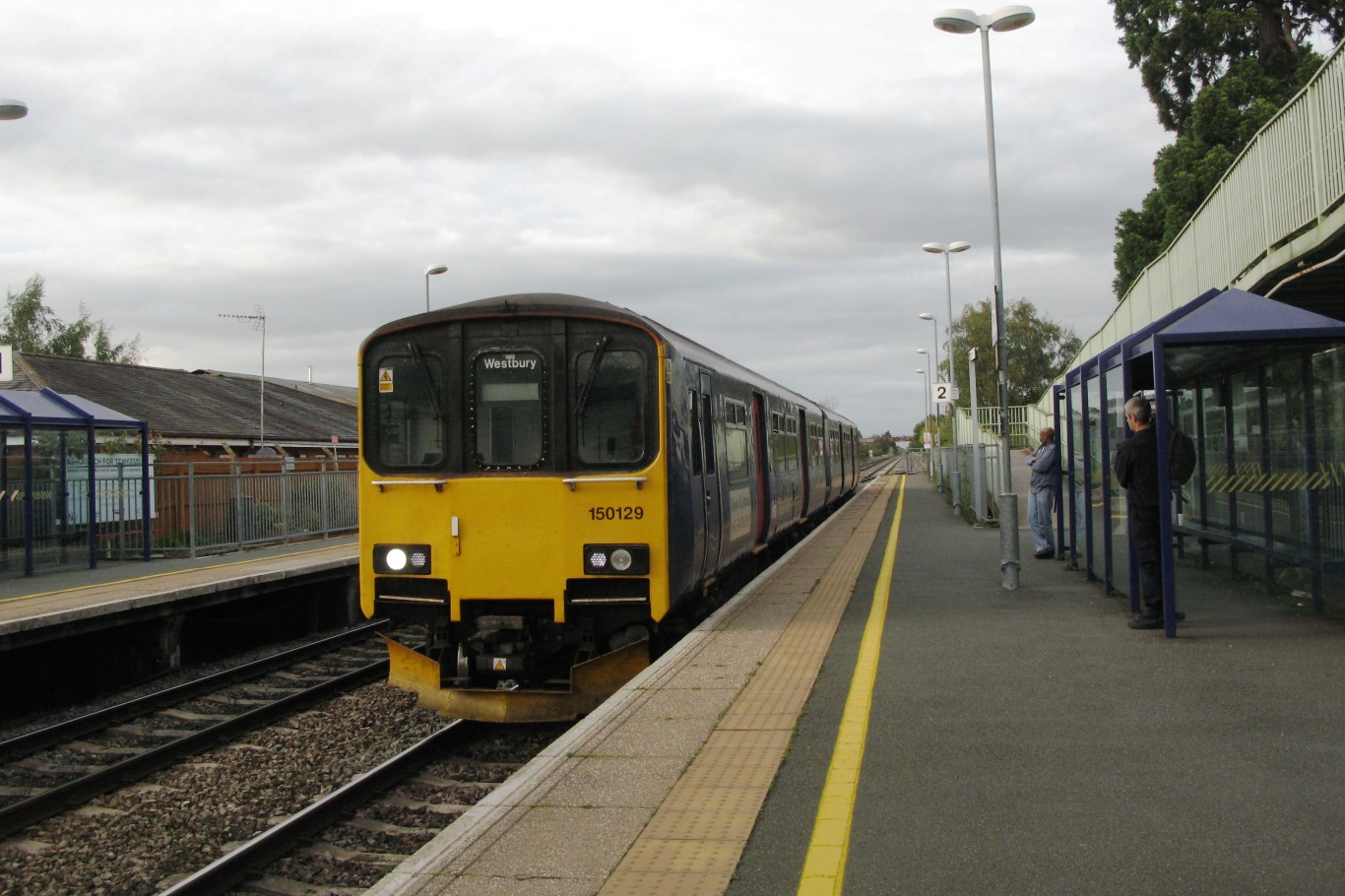
A southbound Great Western Railway service

The station is served by two train operating companies:

- Great Western Railway (GWR) who manage the station, operate an hourly service from Ashchurch. Northbound trains head to Worcester Foregate Street/Worcester Shrub Hill, with one continuing to Great Malvern. Southbound services head to Bristol Temple Meads via Gloucester; one train per day instead goes to London Paddington via Swindon
- CrossCountry operates a small number of services between Cardiff Central and Nottingham that stop here, providing direct trains to Birmingham New Street mainly in the morning and evening peaks. In the December 2019 timetable, one morning Birmingham service from Bristol Temple Meads continues through to Stansted Airport, via Leicester and Peterborough rather than to Nottingham.

On Sundays, the service is limited to five trains each way and is provided by GWR.

=== Future services ===
In 2010, the Ashchurch and Tewkesbury District Rail Promotion Group began campaigning for an improved service to the station. They highlighted the close proximity of the station to junction 9 of the M5 and the free car park as being attractive to potential commuters. CrossCountry trains run three trains per hour in each direction through without stopping and appear to have the potential capacity in the timetable to stop. The group also point out that official figures from the Office of Rail Regulation show 67,000 passengers buying tickets to or from the station in 2008–09; most other stations with that level of patronage have at least an hourly service. The need for an hourly service between Worcester and Cheltenham has previously been noted by other passenger groups.

=== Former services ===
- GWR used to provide only one train every two hours; however, most services ran between Great Malvern and Westbury with extensions to Weymouth and Brighton.
- London Midland ran a two hourly service to Worcester Shrub Hill and Gloucester. On Fridays, one Worcester-bound train continued to Birmingham New Street
- Wales and Borders ran services to Birmingham New Street and Cardiff Central, with some continuing on to West Wales.

Preceding station	National Rail	Following station
Cheltenham Spa	Great Western Railway; Bristol Temple Meads – Worcester Forgate Street	Worcester Shrub Hill
Cheltenham Spa	CrossCountry; Cardiff – Birmingham New Street – Nottingham	Worcestershire Parkway
	Disused railways	
Cleeve	Birmingham and Gloucester Railway	Bredon
Cleeve	Birmingham and Gloucester Railway	Tewkesbury
Terminus	Midland Railway; Evesham loop line	Beckford; Line and station closed
Tewkesbury; Line and station closed	Midland Railway; Tewkesbury and Malvern Railway	Terminus
