= Upton-on-Severn railway station =

Former railway station in Worcestershire, England

Coordinates: 52.0587°N 2.2168°W

Upton on Severn
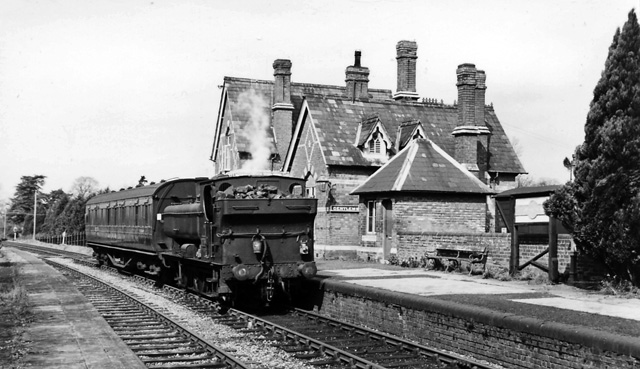
- Upton-on-Severn railway station in 1961

General information
- Location: Upton-on-Severn, Worcestershire; England
- Platforms: 2

Other information
- Status: Disused

History
- Original company: Midland Railway
- Post-grouping: London, Midland and Scottish Railway

Key dates
- 16 May 1864: Station opens as Upton
- April 1889: Renamed Upton-on-Severn
- 14 August 1961: Station closed for passengers
- July 1963: closed for goods
Location

Upton-on-Severn railway station was a railway station serving Upton-on-Severn in the English county of Worcestershire.

== History ==
It was opened by the Midland Railway's Tewkesbury and Malvern Railway between Great Malvern and Ashchurch.

At grouping in 1923 it became part of the London Midland and Scottish Railway, with British Railways taking over upon nationalisation of the railway system in January 1948. The British Transport Commission withdrew the service to Great Malvern on 1 December 1952, with the station henceforth becoming a terminus. It then closed to passengers on 14 August 1961, with the withdrawal of the remaining trains from Ashchurch. Freight traffic continued until July 1963, when the Upton to Tewkesbury section was closed completely.

The station was subsequently demolished and no trace now remains.

== Stationmasters ==
- H. Rich ca. 1864 ca. 1866
- Samuel Hawkins Orchard until 1872 (afterwards station master at Stapleford and Sandiacre)
- Henry Lewis 1872 - 1877
- A. Withers 1877 - 1878
- F.H. Parsons 1878 - 1881
- W.H. Adcock 1881 - 1883
- R. Nash 1883 - 1905
- William Garner Johnson 1906 - ca. 1929
- Edward Harry Taylor ca. 1948

Preceding station	Disused railways	Following station
Malvern Hanley Road; Line and station closed	Tewkesbury and Malvern Railway; Midland Railway	Ripple; Line and station closed
