= Ashchurch Rural =

Coordinates: 51.9923°N 2.1038°W

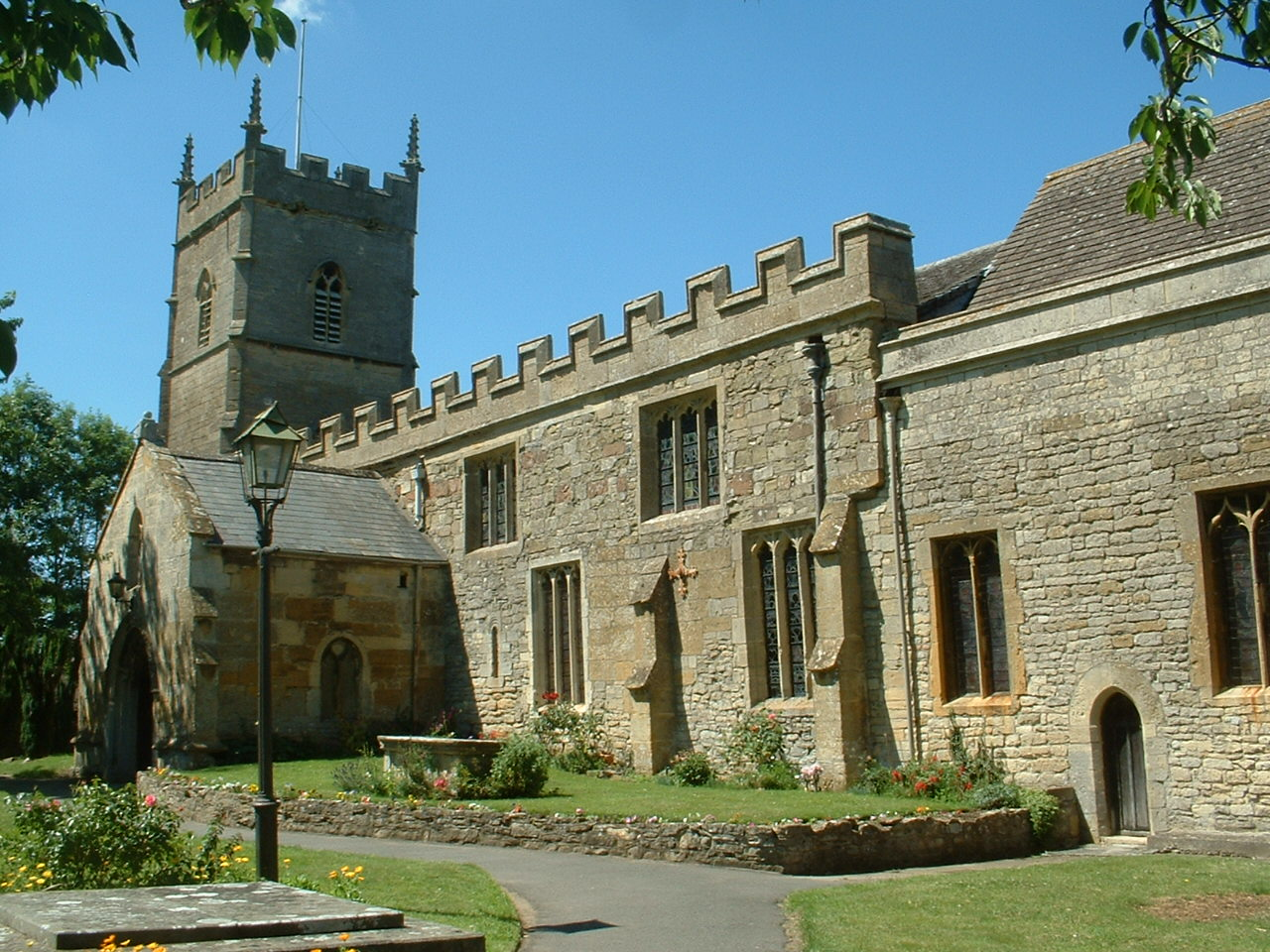
- Ashchurch Church

- Location within Gloucestershire
- Area: 14.25 km^{2} (5.50 sq mi)
- Population: 1,814 (2021 census)
  - Density: 127/km^{2} (330/sq mi)
- Civil parish: Ashchurch Rural
- District: Tewkesbury
- Shire county: Gloucestershire
- Region: South West
- Country: England
- Sovereign state: United Kingdom

Ashchurch Rural is a civil parish in Tewkesbury Borough in Gloucestershire, England. It includes the settlements of Ashchurch, Walton Cardiff, Aston Cross, Aston on Carrant, Pamington and Natton. The parish was created on 1 April 2008 from the former civil parish of Ashchurch and part of the former civil parish of Walton Cardiff. In 2021 the parish had a population of 1814.
