= Great Malvern railway station =

Railway station in Worcestershire, England

Coordinates: 52.109°N 2.318°W

Great Malvern
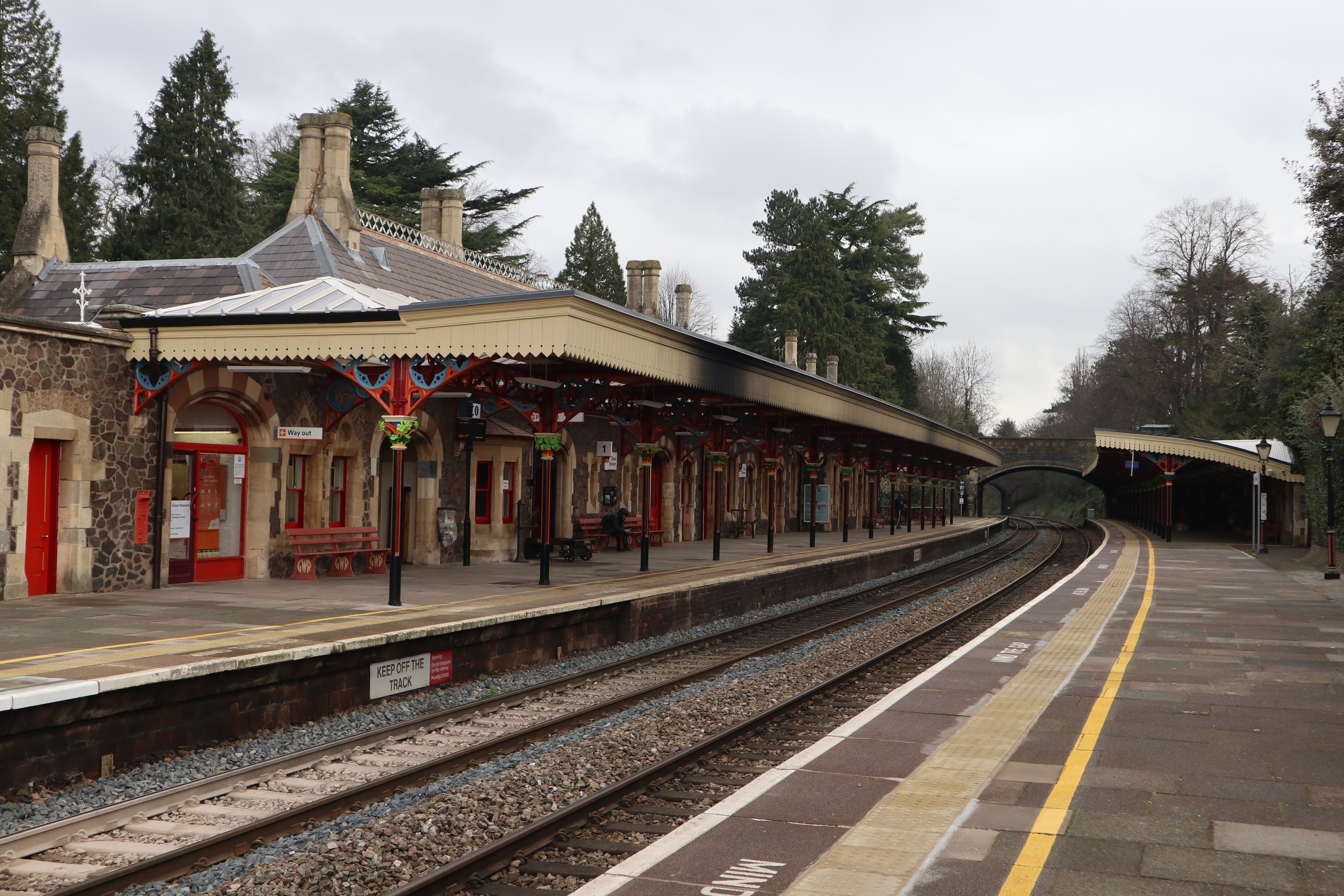
- The platforms pictured in March 2024

General information
- Location: Great Malvern, Malvern Hills, England
- Grid reference: SO783457
- Manager: West Midlands Railway
- Platforms: 2

Other information
- Station code: GMV
- Classification: DfT category D

Passengers
- 2021/22: ▲0.325 million
- 2022/23: ▲0.368 million
- 2023/24: ▲0.401 million
- 2024/25: ▲0.429 million
- 2025/26: ▲0.459 million
Location
Notes
- Passenger statistics from the Office of Rail and Road

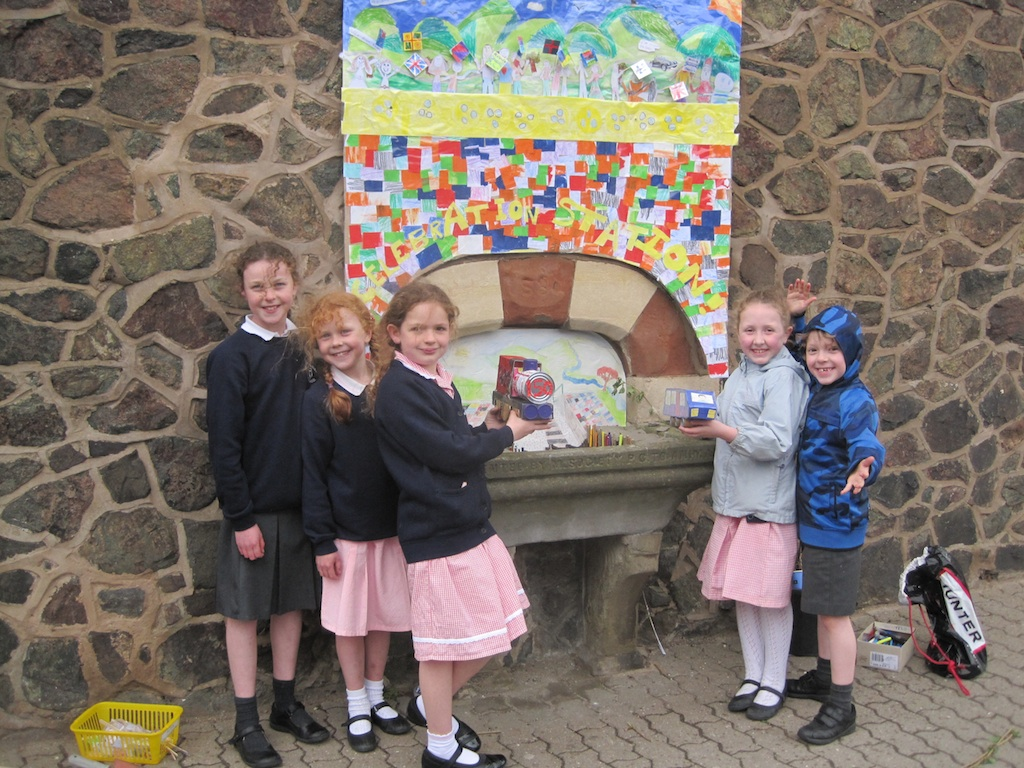
The station drinking fountain, a Malvern spring water spout, gets "well dressed" every year. Naturally, the theme of the decorations was railways in 2010.

Great Malvern is one of two railway stations that serve the town of Malvern, in Worcestershire, England; the other is Malvern Link. It is a stop on the Hereford to Worcester section of the Cotswold Line. It is situated downhill from the centre of Great Malvern and close to Barnards Green. It retains most of its original Victorian station design and is a Grade II listed building.

== History ==
Great Malvern station was opened by the Worcester and Hereford Railway in 1860 and the present buildings, by architect Edmund Wallace Elmslie, were completed in 1862. The Midland Railway and the London and North Western Railway collaborated on the construction cost; the solicitor, Samuel Carter, held the same role for both of these major companies. It was later absorbed by the Great Western Railway.

Lady Emily Foley was a key sponsor of the building of Great Malvern station. She had a waiting room made for her exclusive use.

The station celebrated its 150th birthday on 23 May 2010, with the unveiling of a plaque and a special train. An additional part of this celebration was the reinstatement of some of the highly decorated lighting columns around the cab road, at the front of the station.

There was previously a branch line to Ashchurch, via Upton-on-Severn and Tewkesbury. Operated by the Midland Railway, it was closed in 1952.

Before May 2022, there was one through service to and from Brighton. This service has since been withdrawn.

== Architecture ==
The station buildings are built from local Malvern Rag stone and follow a French Gothic theme.

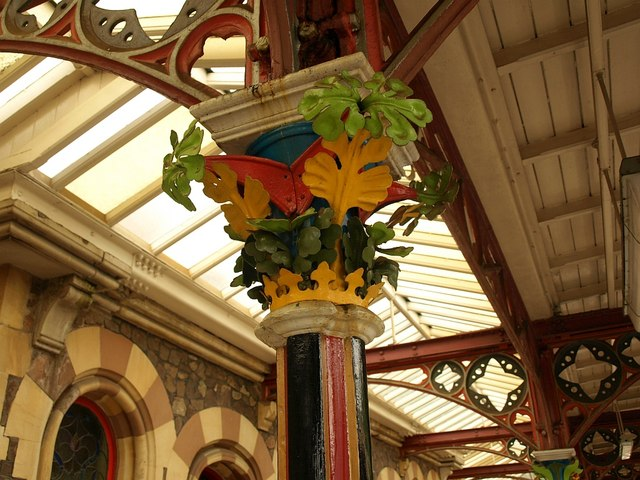
Floral capital to a canopy column

A particular feature of the station are the deep canopies, which are supported by elaborate cast-iron girders; these in turn are supported by columns with elaborate capitals. These capitals are decorated with high relief mouldings depicting different arrangements of flowers and foliage. The sculptor, William Forsyth, was employed to work on the buildings and designed the metal capitals of the columns, which support the canopies above both platforms of the station.

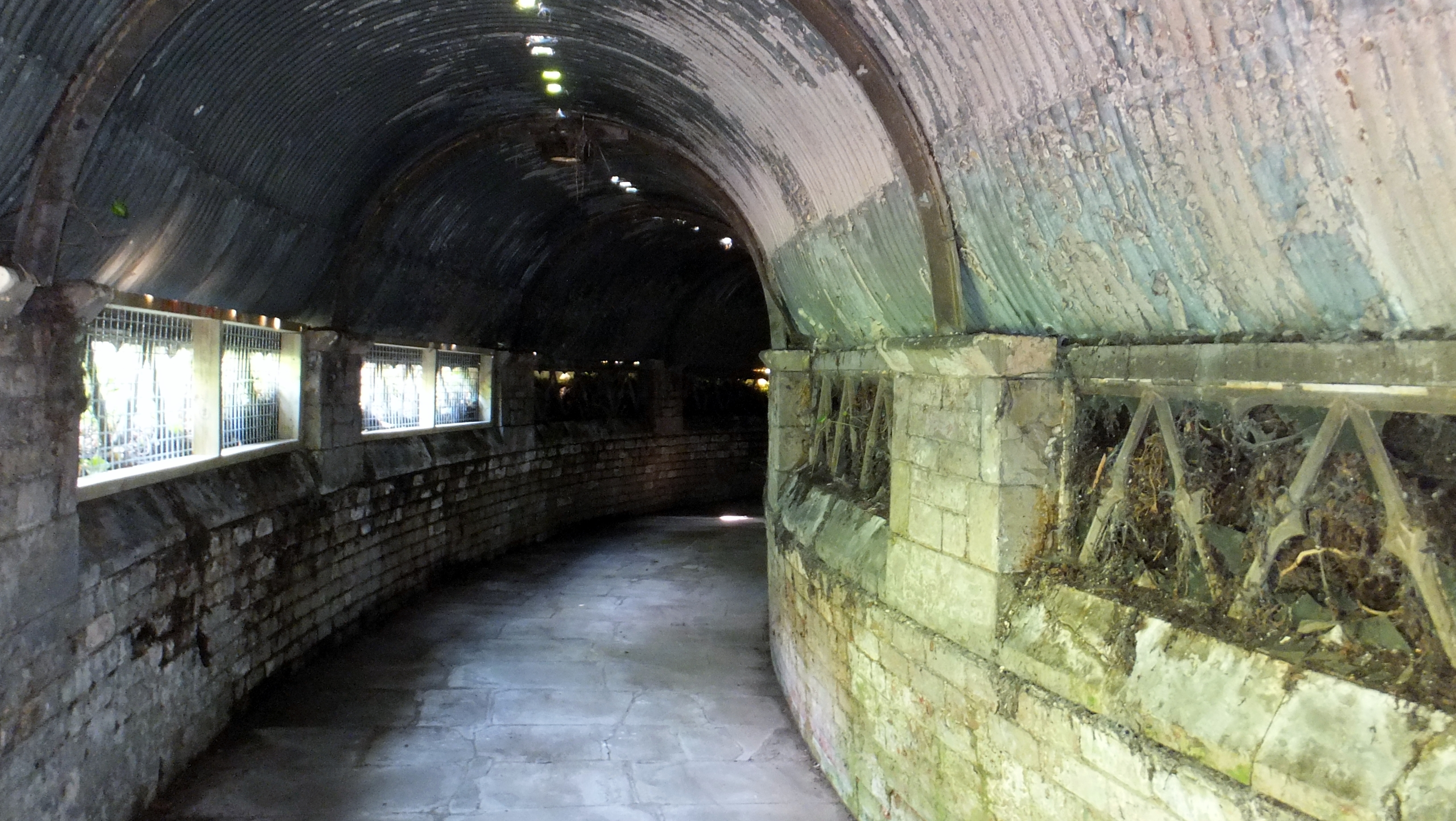
Interior view of the Worm

At the end of platform 2 is the entrance to the Worm, an enclosed passageway that leads under Avenue Road into the former Imperial Hotel (now Malvern St James). It formed a private pedestrian access and is believed to be the only structure of its kind in the country. Although in need of extensive restoration and generally not open to the public, the Worm is itself Grade II listed.

== Facilities ==
There is a ticket office and an award-winning café which opened in 1984, named Lady Foley's Tea Room, after Lady Emily Foley, on the London-bound platform.

In 2023, Network Rail spent £8 million on restoration of the platform canopies, sculptures, overhead glazing and ironwork. The Victorian station clock is now also working following an £8,000 restoration in 2021 after having been stuck for over three years. The work included replacing all the glass in the station canopies.

== Services ==
The station is served by two train operating companies:

- Great Western Railway operates a roughly hourly service to London Paddington, via the Cotswold Line and Oxford; some of these run to/from Hereford and every two hours to Bristol Temple Meads, via Gloucester. Many Bristol services continue onwards to Westbury and Weymouth.
- West Midlands Railway, which also manages the station, operates services every hour to Birmingham New Street, via Worcester Foregate Street and Hereford. There are also some services to Whitlocks End and Dorridge via the Snow Hill Lines. A handful of services start or terminate here each day, to/from Worcester and Birmingham.

Preceding station	National Rail	Following station
Colwall	Great Western Railway; Cotswold Line	Malvern Link
Colwall	Great Western Railway; Great Malvern–Bristol	Malvern Link
Colwall	West Midlands Railway; Birmingham–Hereford	Malvern Link
Terminus	West Midlands Railway; Birmingham–Great Malvern	
	Disused railways	
Terminus	Tewkesbury and Malvern Railway; Midland Railway	Malvern Hanley Road; Line and station closed
