= Tewkesbury and Malvern Railway =

Railway in UK

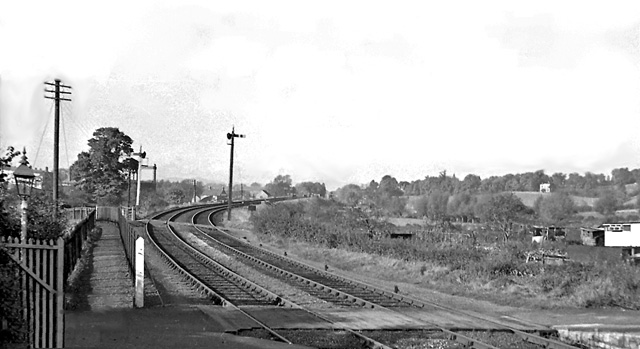

Overview
- Locale: Tewkesbury and Malvern
- Dates of operation: 16 May 1864–14 August 1961
- Successor: Midland Railway

Technical
- Track gauge: 1,435 mm (4 ft 8 1/2 in) standard gauge
- Length: 13.5 miles (21.7 kilometres)

Tewkesbury and Malvern Railway Act 1860
- Act of Parliament
- Parliament of the United Kingdom
- Long title: An Act for making a Railway from the Ashchurch and Tewkesbury Branch of the Midland Railway at Ashchurch in the County of Gloucester to Great Malvern in the County of Worcester, and for other Purposes.
- Citation: 23 & 24 Vict. c. lxxii

Dates
- Royal assent: 25 May 1860

Text of statute as originally enacted

Tewkesbury and Malvern Railway Act 1862
- Act of Parliament
- Parliament of the United Kingdom
- Long title: An Act to confer upon the Tewkesbury and Malvern Railway Company further Powers for the Completion of their Railway; and for other Purposes.
- Citation: 25 & 26 Vict. c. lvi

Dates
- Royal assent: 30 June 1862

The Tewkesbury and Malvern Railway was a branch of the Midland Railway which ran from Ashchurch via Tewkesbury to Great Malvern in the United Kingdom. It was authorised by the Tewkesbury and Malvern Railway Act 1860 (23 & 24 Vict. c. lxxii), and opened on 16 May 1864. At grouping in 1923 it became part of the London Midland and Scottish Railway.

== Connections ==
It connected with the Worcester and Hereford Railway and the Birmingham and Gloucester Railway.

== Structures ==
There were two significant bridges when first constructed – over the River Avon at Tewkesbury (62 yards or 57 metres) and over the River Severn at Saxons Lode (145 yards or 133 metres) with five spans and a sliding centre section to allow tall masted ships to pass). There was also a 420-yard (380-metre) tunnel and a long embankment and viaduct over a floodplain at The Mythe near Tewkesbury. The embankment, viaducts and remaining bridges were demolished in 2013 as part of the Tewkesbury area flooding improvement works with the bricks being reused in the reconstruction of the Gloucestershire Warwickshire Railway Broadway station. In 1961 a bridge over the M50 motorway was erected – as of 2012 this bridge has been removed and moved to the Bluebell Railway.

== Closure ==
The section of line from Malvern to Upton-upon-Severn was closed in December 1952. The remainder closed to passengers on 14 August 1961. Freight continued to operate to Upton until July 1963, then as far as Tewkesbury until December 1964.
