= Malvern Wells railway station =

Former railway station in Worcestershire, England

Malvern Wells

General information
- Location: Lower Wyche, Malvern Hills, Worcestershire; England
- Coordinates: 52.0953°N 2.3236°W
- Grid reference: SO779441
- Platforms: 2

Other information
- Status: Disused

History
- Original company: Worcester & Hereford Railway
- Pre-grouping: Great Western Railway

Key dates
- 25 May 1860: Station opens
- 19 January 1861: Closed
- 1 February 1864: Reopened
- 5 April 1965: Station closes
Location

Malvern Wells railway station was a station on the Worcester and Hereford section of the Great Western Railway at Lower Wyche, between Great Malvern and Colwall. On timetables it was listed as Malvern Wells GW to distinguish it from the nearby Midland Railway station which later became known as Malvern Hanley Road.

The station closed in 1965, but the signal box here remains open as it controls the line towards Ledbury, which becomes single track at this point prior to passing through the tunnels at Colwall and Ledbury. Trains terminating at Great Malvern also run here to reverse before returning east.

Preceding station	Disused railways	Following station
Great Malvern	Great Western Railway; Cotswold Line	Colwall
