= Ashperton railway station =

Former railway station in Herefordshire, England

Ashperton
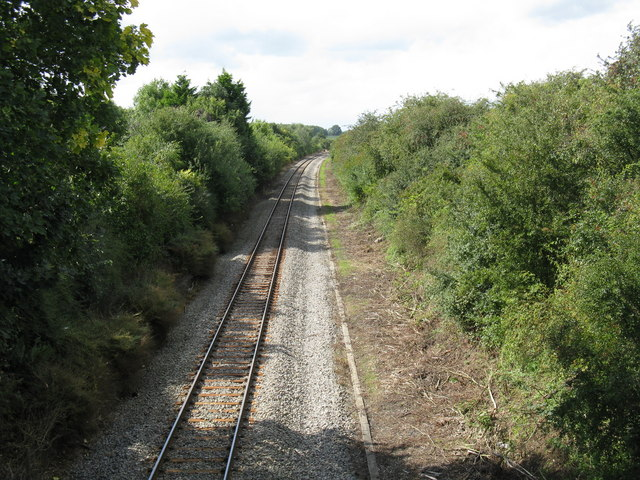

General information
- Location: Ashperton, Herefordshire; England
- Coordinates: 52.0594°N 2.5110°W
- Grid reference: SO650402
- Platforms: 2

Other information
- Status: Disused

History
- Original company: Worcester and Hereford Railway
- Pre-grouping: Great Western Railway
- Post-grouping: Great Western Railway

Key dates
- 13 September 1861: Station opens as Ashperton
- 2 November 1964: Station renamed Ashperton Halt
- 5 April 1965: Station closed
Location

Ashperton railway station was a railway station serving the village of Ashperton in Herefordshire, England. It was located on what is now known as the Cotswold Line.

== History ==
Opened by the Worcester and Hereford Railway, it became part of the West Midland Railway then was absorbed by the Great Western Railway. The station then passed on to the Western Region of British Railways on nationalisation in 1948. It was then closed by the British Railways Board.

Preceding station	National Rail	Following station
Stoke Edith	Great Western Railway; Worcester and Hereford Railway	Ledbury

== The site today ==
Trains on the Cotswold Line pass the site. Geograph
