= Withington railway station (Herefordshire) =

Former railway station in Herefordshire, England

Withington

General information
- Location: Withington, Herefordshire; England
- Coordinates: 52.0775°N 2.6353°W
- Grid reference: SO565423
- Platforms: 2

Other information
- Status: Disused

History
- Original company: West Midland Railway
- Pre-grouping: Great Western Railway
- Post-grouping: Great Western Railway

Key dates
- 13 September 1861: Opened
- 2 January 1961: Closed
Location

Withington railway station was a station in Withington, Herefordshire, England. The station was opened in 1861 and closed in 1961.

Preceding station	Disused railways	Following station
Hereford; Line and station open	Great Western Railway; West Midland Railway	Stoke Edith; Line open, station closed
