= Calladine =

Calladine is an English surname, originating in Nottinghamshire. While its exact meaning is unknown, it could possibly be a variant of Carwardine. Notable people with the surname include:

- Charlie Calladine (1911–1983), English footballer
- Christopher Calladine (born 1935), English engineer
- Norm Calladine (1914–1988), Canadian ice hockey player
