= Ascott-under-Wychwood railway station =

Railway station in Oxfordshire, England

Coordinates: 51.867°N 1.564°W

Ascott-under-Wychwood
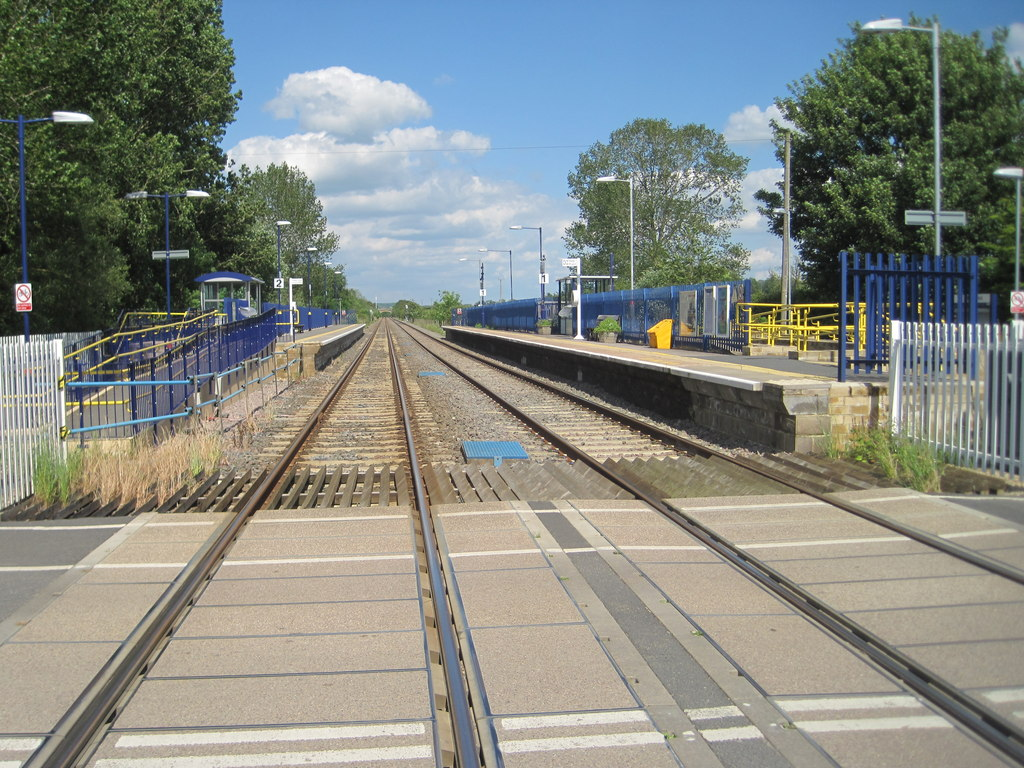
- View towards Oxford after works to redouble the track

General information
- Location: Ascott-under-Wychwood, West Oxfordshire; England
- Grid reference: SP301188
- Manager: Great Western Railway
- Platforms: 2

Other information
- Station code: AUW
- Classification: DfT category F2

History
- Opened: 4 June 1853
- Original company: Oxford, Worcester and Wolverhampton Railway
- Pre-grouping: Great Western Railway
- Post-grouping: GWR

Key dates
- 4 June 1853: Station opened as Ascott
- 1 February 1880: Renamed to Ascott-Under-Wychwood
- 24 May 1965: Renamed to Ascott-Under-Wychwood Halt
- 5 May 1969: Renamed to Ascott-Under-Wychwood

Passengers
- 2021/22: ▲1,162
- 2022/23: ▲1,628
- 2023/24: ▼1,392
- 2024/25: ▼1,282
- 2025/26: ▼928
Location
Notes
- Passenger statistics from the Office of Rail and Road

Ascott-under-Wychwood railway station is a railway station serving the village of Ascott-under-Wychwood in Oxfordshire, England. It is on the Cotswold Line. The station, and all trains serving it, are operated by Great Western Railway.

West of the station is a level crossing, controlled by Ascott-under-Wychwood Signal Box, which also oversees the adjacent end of the double-tracked section of the Cotswold Line. Under proposals to extend the doubling of the route, the signal box was to be removed but budgetary constraints on resignalling led to that proposal being revised.

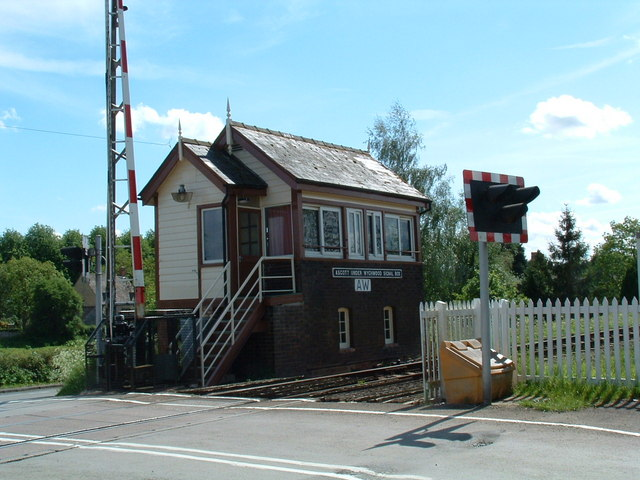
Ascott-under-Wychwood Signal Box

== History ==
Opened by the Oxford, Worcester and Wolverhampton Railway, it became part of the West Midland Railway and then was absorbed by the Great Western Railway. The station then passed on to the Western Region of British Railways on nationalisation in 1948.

The Reshaping of British Railways report proposed the closure of Ascott-under-Wychwood station, but the recommendation was not implemented.

When British Rail introduced Sectorisation in the 1980s, the station was served by Network SouthEast until the Privatisation of British Rail. It was then managed by Thames Trains, but after a short period with First Great Western Link, it is now managed by Great Western Railway.

== Services ==
Currently there is only one peak-hour train per day in each direction Mondays–Fridays including most bank holidays, and no regular Saturday or Sunday service. A limited Saturday service operates in the weeks running up to Christmas.

Preceding station	National Rail	Following station
Shipton	Great Western Railway; Cotswold Line; Mondays-Fridays only	Charlbury
