= Colwall Tunnels =

Pair of railway tunnels in England

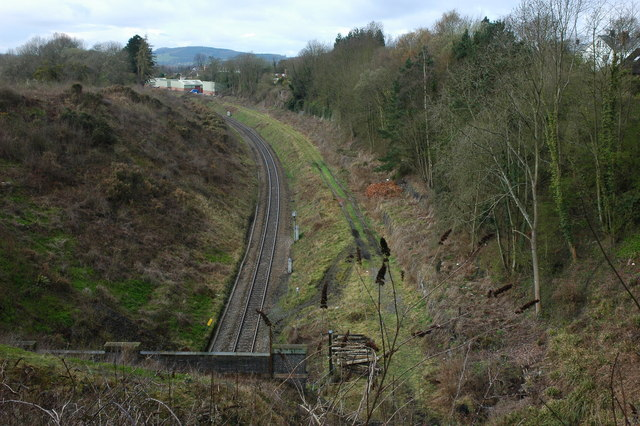
- Interactive map of Colwall Tunnels

Overview
- Location: Colwall, Herefordshire to Malvern Wells, Worcestershire
- Coordinates: 52.08391°N 2.350527°W
- Status: One disused; one operational
- Start: Colwall railway station
- End: Malvern Wells railway station

Operation
- Work began: 1853
- Opened: 17 September 1861
- Closed: 2 August 1926
- Rebuilt: 1924 - 1926
- Reopened: 2 August 1926
- Owner: Worcester and Hereford Railway (original); GWR (Post Grouping); Network Rail (current)
- Operator: Great Western Railway; West Midlands Trains
- Character: Passenger

Technical
- Length: 1,567 yd (0.890 mi)
- No. of tracks: 1
- Track gauge: 1,435 mm (4 ft 8 1/2 in) standard gauge

The Colwall Tunnels are a pair of railway tunnels that connect Colwall and Malvern Wells on the Cotswold Line, passing under the Malvern Hills in the Welsh Marches region of England.

The original route planned for the Worcester and Hereford Railway did not include the first tunnel, but its inclusion became necessary in response to pressure for the line to serve the towns of Malvern and Ledbury. The first Colwall Tunnel was one of the railway's greatest engineering challenges, after several years of work, it was opened to traffic on 17 September 1861. Its limited cross-section and single track configuration were often felt to be inadequate, contributing to pressure for a second tunnel to be constructed. A partial collapse of the first tunnel during 1907, temporarily blocking the railway, was another contributing factor.

During the 1920s, work on the construction of a second tunnel commenced. Once this newer, wider bore was completed and brought into service on 2 August 1926, the original Colwall Tunnel was permanently closed that same day. It was used during the Second World War for storing munitions, being furnished with a concrete floor and a narrow-gauge railway. Only the newer bore remains in use as of the present day. It has been proposed to reopen the older bore as a cycle route.

== Colwall Old Tunnel ==
The origins of the Colwall Tunnels are directly connected to the development of a railway between Worcester and Hereford, which was first mooted during the early 1850s. The original intended route for the railway was actually a much straighter route running directly between the coalfields of South Wales and the industries surrounding Birmingham and the Black Country, roughly parallel to the present day A4103. As a result of considerable lobbying by the citizens in the towns of Malvern and Ledbury, who sought the new line to serve their locations as well, it was decided to change the railway's route to include them; this new route necessitated construction of two tunnels (along with two viaducts and a bridge), one of the former being the first Colwall Tunnel.

During 1856, work on constructing the Worcester and Hereford Railway commenced. The need to traverse the Malvern Hills represented the endeavour's largest engineering challenge; in addition to Colwall Tunnel, Ledbury Tunnel was also constructed for the line. Both tunnels share considerable similarities, such as a relatively narrow cross section and only able to accommodate a single track; trains were particularly constrained by the tunnel's dimensions. The completed bore has a maximum depth below the surface of roughly 600 ft; airflow in the tunnel is augmented by a pair of ventilation shafts.

The tunnel had to be bored through relatively hard rock only using the manual methods available at the time. Local engineer Stephen Ballard was appointed to complete the work. Being bored by navvies from either end of the tunnel, work progressed at an average rate of ten feet per week. However, once the igneous Malvern rock (some of the hardest rock to be found in Great Britain) was reached, the rate of progress slowed to as little as 15 cm (six inches) per day. Further complications came in the form of spring waters, multiple pumps had to be installed to remove the water from the construction site; this water source was subsequently helpful, being used to refill the line's steam locomotives, as well as being piped to Great Malvern railway station.

On 17 September 1861, the first Colwall Tunnel was opened to traffic. During 1907, the tunnel suffered a partial collapse around one of the ventilation shafts, resulting in the line being temporarily blocked until engineers could implement repairs to the tunnel. The problematic original bore was closed on 2 August 1926, having been replaced by a newer, wider bore that was opened to traffic that same day.

During 1939, the disused tunnel was appropriated for military use as a munitions storage facility on behalf of the Admiralty. It was refurbished with repairs made to the lining of the tunnel. Both a concrete floor and a narrow-gauge railway was laid along its length, enabling stores to be transported to either end of the bore. By July 1941, this new railway was operational; its locomotives were stored engine sheds built just outside either end of the tunnel. Shortly following the end of the Second World War, the facility was deemed to be surplus to requirements, thus the narrow-gauge railway was dismantled and it fell back into disuse once more. It was around this time that both of the tunnel mouths were sealed with steel sheeting to make them inaccessible.

In the present day, the original bore forms a part of the Malvern Hills Site of Special Scientific Interest, and is used for winter hibernation by a colony of about 700 lesser horseshoe bats, but is otherwise disused and inaccessible. The Ledbury Area Cycle Forum has promoted a project to reopen the disused tunnel as a recreational and utility facility for cyclists and walkers. It is periodically inspected by engineers for safety purposes.

== Colwall New Tunnel ==
By the 1920s, it was clear that the original Colwall Tunnel possessed several negative attributes, including being very narrow, relatively low and steep (it had a gradient of 1 in 23, 64% steeper than the famous Lickey Incline), all of which made it increasingly difficult to accommodate the emerging specification of rolling stock. Furthermore, locomotive crews complained about the tunnel's inhospitable conditions; there were cases of individuals passing out on the footplate due to the fumes. Accordingly, management decided that the best solution would be to construct a new, wider tunnel directly adjacent to the existing bore. Construction work commenced in 1924, it was completed only two years later, significantly faster than work had proceeded on the first tunnel. The greater speed of work was credited to the advance in tunnelling techniques and the availability of new pneumatically-powered tools. The new tunnel had a contract price of £196,080.

The second Colwall Tunnel was opened to traffic on 2 August 1926, while the old bore was closed on that same day. Like the original Colwall Tunnel, the new bore carries a single track throughout. There have been petitions and studies conducted for the whole line, including the tunnel, to be double-tracked throughout; it has been observed that any reengineering or replacement programme would incur considerable expense. Irrespective, the newer tunnel remains active to the present day.
