= Charlbury railway station =

Railway station in Oxfordshire, England

Coordinates: 51.872°N 1.490°W

Charlbury
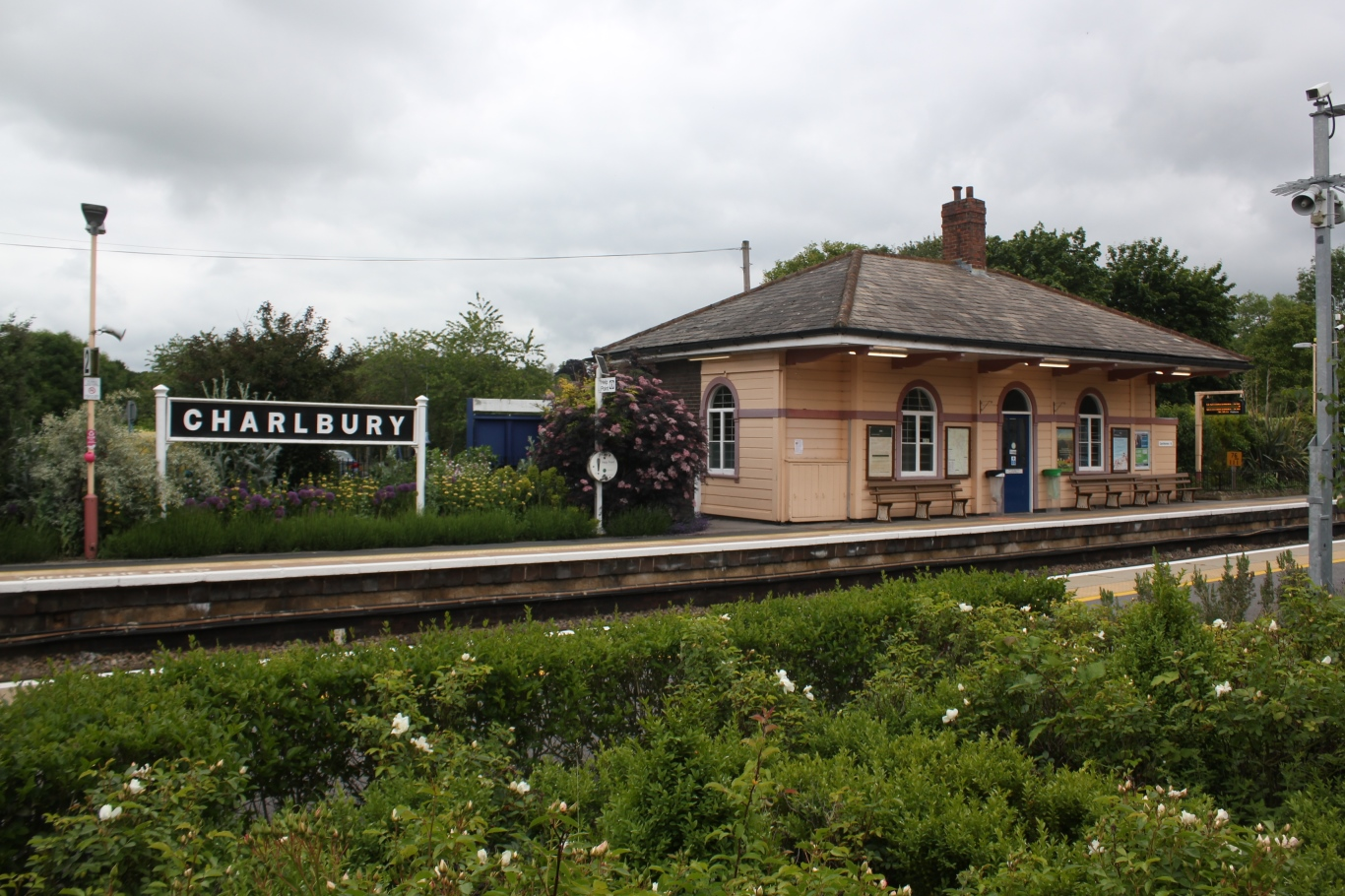

General information
- Location: Charlbury, West Oxfordshire; England
- Grid reference: SP352194
- Managed by: Great Western Railway
- Platforms: 2

Other information
- Station code: CBY
- Classification: DfT category E

History
- Original company: Oxford, Worcester and Wolverhampton Railway
- Pre-grouping: Great Western Railway
- Post-grouping: GWR

Key dates
- 4 June 1853: Opened
- 29 November 1971: Line singled
- 6 June 2011: Line redoubled

Passengers
- 2020/21: ▼55,812
- 2021/22: ▲0.200 million
- 2022/23: ▲0.257 million
- 2023/24: ▲0.276 million
- 2024/25: ▲0.343 million
Location
Notes
- Passenger statistics from the Office of Rail and Road

Charlbury railway station is a railway station serving the town of Charlbury in Oxfordshire, England. This station and all trains serving it are operated by Great Western Railway. After almost 40 years as a single-platform station, the track through Charlbury station was redoubled with the recommissioning of a second platform on 6 June 2011 as part of the project to improve reliability and increase traffic capacity on the Cotswold Line.

== History ==
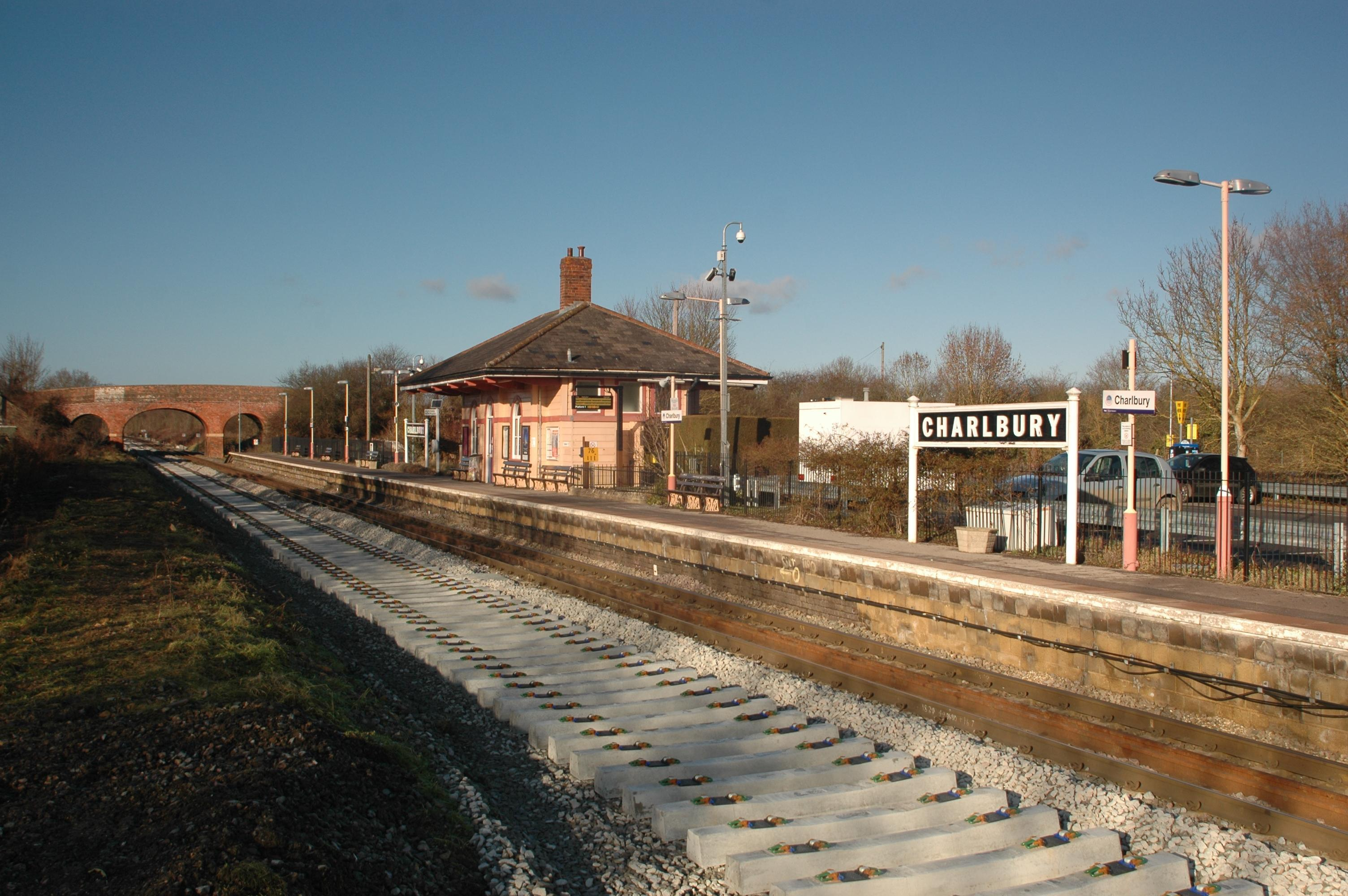
Charlbury station on 9 January 2011, showing concrete sleepers newly laid for the restoration of double track and platform 2

The Oxford, Worcester and Wolverhampton Railway opened the station in 1853. It is notable for the original station building, a wooden chalet-type structure in the Italianate architectural style of Isambard Kingdom Brunel; together with the early station nameboard this is a Grade II listed building restored in 1979. Until 1970 the station had a goods shed, a 30 cwt crane and a 34-lever signal box. The signal box was demolished when the line through the station was singled on 29 November 1971.

Sir Peter Parker (1924–2002), the former chairman of the British Railways Board, was a regular user of the station.

With the completion of the first stage of the redoubling of the Cotswold Line from Ascott-under-Wychwood to a point east of Charlbury, the second platform, decommissioned in 1971, was reinstated and returned to service on 6 June 2011.

=== 2018 Improvement Works ===
Charlbury and Kingham are two of the stations on the Cotswold Line that had their platforms lengthened to accommodate longer GWR Class 802 units, which are nine carriages long — one carriage longer than the longest trains that previously used the station.

== Facilities ==
Charlbury station is one of the only two-platform stations on the Cotswold Line to have step-free access to both platforms. This has been achieved by installing a long set of ramps from the lower car park to both platforms.

Charlbury is one of the only stations in the area that has a user-operated ticket machine. Kingham and Finstock, the main stations on the either side of Charlbury, do not have such facilities. However, passengers travelling from either of these stations when the ticket office is closed can board the service and buy a ticket on the train.

== Services ==
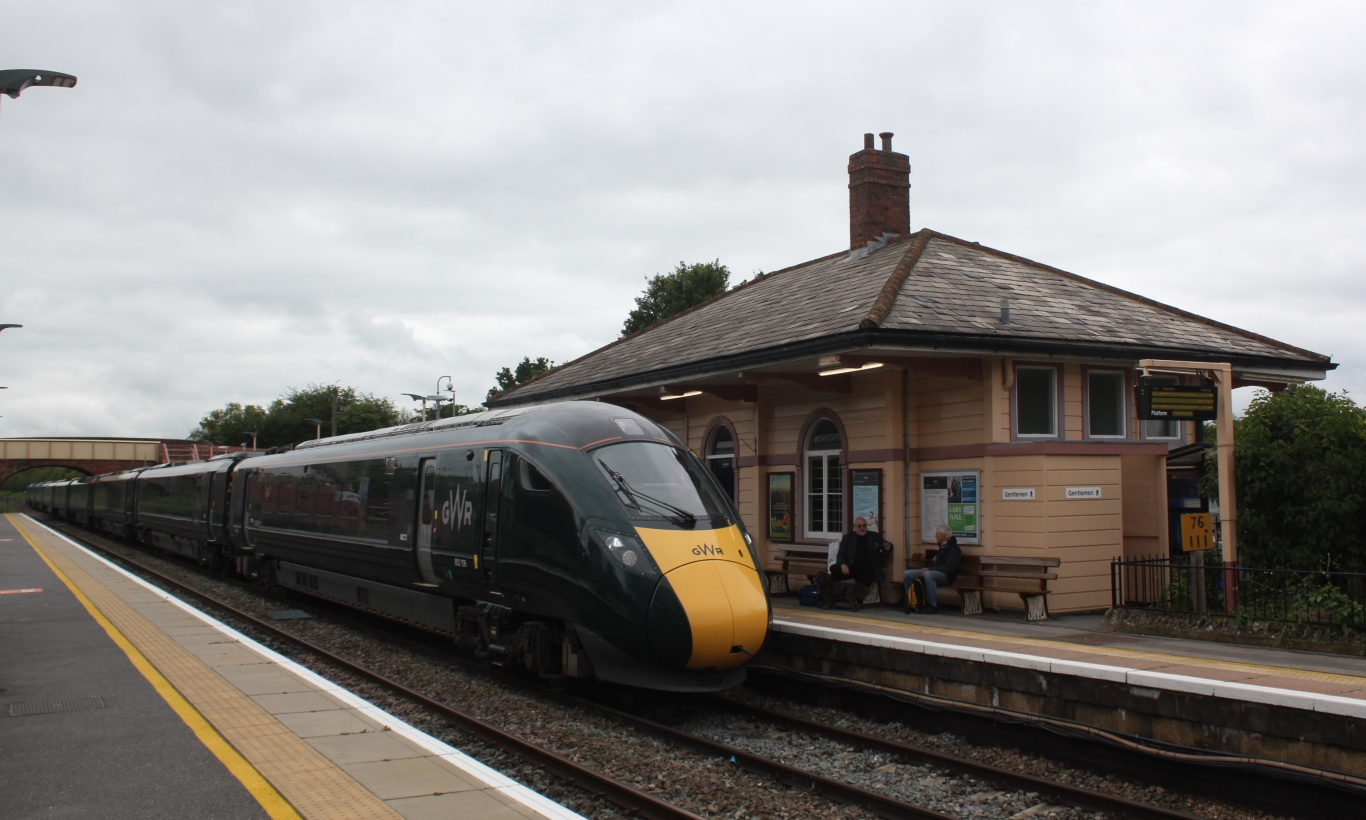
A Great Western Railway Class 802 with a service to London Paddington

Great Western Railway operate all services at Charlbury. The typical off-peak service in trains per hour is:

- 1 tph to London Paddington
- 1 tph to Worcester Foregate Street of which some continue to Great Malvern and Hereford

Preceding station	National Rail	Following station
Ascott-under-Wychwood (Shipton on Saturdays, Kingham on Sundays)	Great Western Railway; Cotswold Line	Finstock (Hanborough on Saturdays and Sundays)
