= Ledbury Tunnel =

Railway tunnel in Herefordshire, England

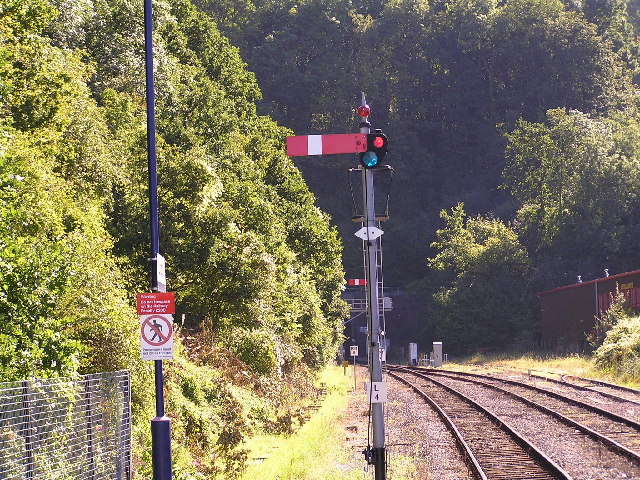
- Interactive map of Ledbury Tunnel

Overview
- Location: Ledbury, Herefordshire
- Coordinates: 52.044932°N 2.421541°W
- Status: Operational
- Start: Ledbury railway station

Operation
- Opened: 1861
- Operator: Worcester and Hereford Railway

Technical
- Length: 1323 yds
- No. of tracks: Single
- Track gauge: 1,435 mm (4 ft 8 1/2 in) standard gauge

Ledbury Tunnel is a single-track railway tunnel immediately to the east of Ledbury railway station on the Cotswold Line, in Herefordshire, England.

The original route planned for the Worcester and Hereford Railway did not include the tunnel, but its inclusion became necessary in response to pressure for the line to serve the towns of Malvern and Ledbury. Ledbury Tunnel was one of the railway's greatest engineering challenges, being bored through the limestone of Dog Hill; it was opened to traffic during 1861. Possessing a relatively narrow cross-section, the tunnel suffered from a particularly poor atmosphere during the era of steam. Unlike the Colwall tunnel, which was also constructed for the line, Ledbury Tunnel has not been widened, replaced, or substantially reengineered since its original completion in the 1860s. It remains in use through to the present today.

== History ==
The origins of the Ledbury Tunnel are directly connected to the development of a railway between Worcester and Hereford, which was first mooted during the early 1850s. The original intended route for the railway was actually a much straighter route running directly between the coalfields of South Wales and the industries surrounding Birmingham and the Black Country, roughly parallel to the present day A4103. As a result of considerable lobbying by the citizens in the towns of Malvern and Ledbury, who sought the new line to serve their locations as well, it was decided to change the railway's route to include them; this new route necessitated construction of two tunnels (along with two viaducts and a bridge), one of the former being the Ledbury Tunnel.

During 1856, work on constructing the Worcester and Hereford Railway commenced. The need to traverse the Malvern Hills represented the endeavour's largest engineering challenge; in addition to the Ledbury Tunnel, the Colwall tunnel was also constructed for the route. Both tunnels share considerable similarities, both having a relatively narrow cross section and only able to accommodate a single track; trains are particularly constrained by the tunnel's dimensions. The excavation of the tunnel provided a valuable opportunity to study the geology, dating to the Devonian age; findings included significant numbers of fossilised fish, acanthodians and ostracoderms, some complete with the body and tail.

The completed tunnel was opened to traffic during 1861, allowing for traffic to reach Hereford for the first time in September of that year. It has a length of 1,200m (1,323 yards), carrying a single line throughout. During the period in which the route was being served by steam locomotives, Ledbury Tunnel became notorious among crews for possessing a poor atmosphere, which was attributed to its unusually narrow bore combined with a steep gradient (1:80) and a bend close to its northern portal. As a consequence of the tight clearance in the tunnel, there are special rules in place for the evacuation of passengers in an emergency situation.

On the 18 July 1872, a passenger train emerging from the tunnel on the farthest side from ledbury collided with the engine of a goods train, resulting in some of the passengers being "shaken and bruised" but with no serious injury. On 15 August of the same year, a train traversing Ledbury Tunnel derailed and collided with the structure; again no injuries or fatalities resulted. Five wagons were "piled in ruins" and the tunnel roof was damaged significantly.

Unlike the Colwall tunnel, the Ledbury tunnel has never been replaced or widened since its original construction back in the 1860s. However, there have been petitions and studies for the whole line, including the tunnel, to be double-tracked throughout; it has been observed that any reengineering or replacement programme would incur considerable expense.
