= Stoke Edith railway station =

Former railway station in Herefordshire, England

Stoke Edith
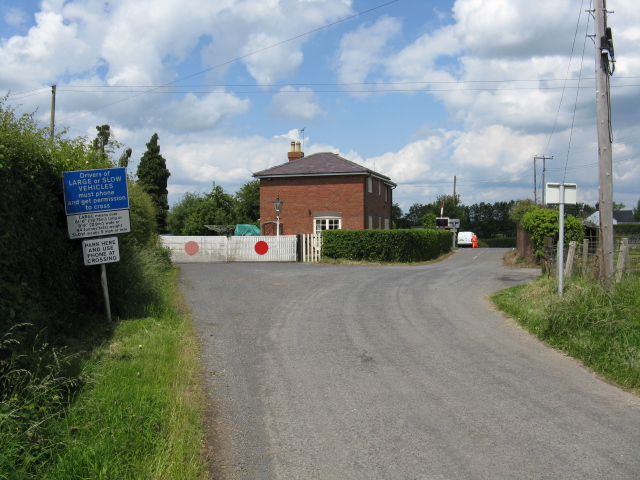
- The site of the station in 2009

General information
- Location: Tarrington, Herefordshire; England
- Coordinates: 52.0692°N 2.5639°W
- Grid reference: SO614413
- Platforms: 2

Other information
- Status: Disused

History
- Original company: Worcester and Hereford Railway
- Pre-grouping: Great Western Railway
- Post-grouping: Great Western Railway

Key dates
- 1861: Opened
- 5 April 1965: Closed
Location

Stoke Edith railway station was a station in Tarrington, Herefordshire, England. The station served the nearby village of Stoke Edith, was opened in 1861 and closed in 1965.

Preceding station	Disused railways	Following station
Withington; Line open, station closed	Great Western Railway; Worcester and Hereford Railway	Ashperton; Line open, station closed
