= Colwall railway station =

Railway station in Herefordshire, England

Coordinates: 52.080°N 2.357°W

Colwall
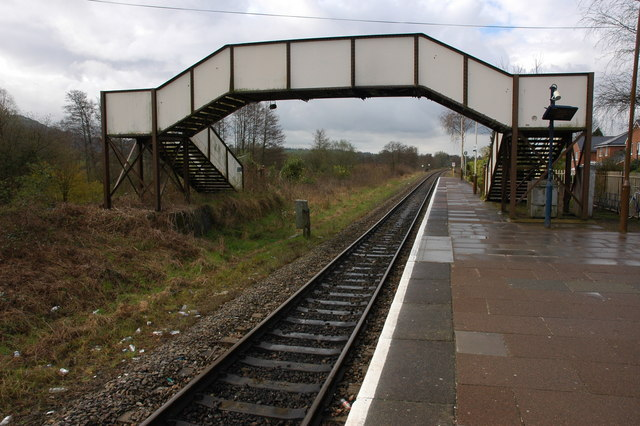

General information
- Location: Colwall, Herefordshire; England
- Grid reference: SO756424
- Manager: West Midlands Railway
- Platforms: 1

Other information
- Station code: CWL
- Classification: DfT category F2

History
- Opened: 1861

Passengers
- 2020/21: ▼19,102
- 2021/22: ▲44,866
- 2022/23: ▲52,402
- 2023/24: ▲56,824
- 2024/25: ▲63,456
Location
Notes
- Passenger statistics from the Office of Rail and Road

Colwall railway station is a railway station on the Cotswold Line serving the village of Colwall in Herefordshire, England. The station has one platform with seating. There is no ticket office; a passenger-operated Permit to Travel machine is installed, and there has been a ticket machine (for use with credit and debit cards only) since 2015.

The station was opened in 1861, the same year as the Hereford and Worcester Railway Line.

Today services are available direct to London Paddington, Birmingham and Hereford. To the west lies Ledbury Tunnel and to the east, the Colwall Tunnels.

The station is close to the Colwall Park Hotel and the (now defunct) Malvern Water bottling plant.

== Services ==
The station is served by two operators - West Midlands Trains run an hourly service to Hereford and Birmingham New Street via Worcester Foregate Street and Bromsgrove. Some trains run to Stratford-on-Avon via Birmingham Snow Hill using the Birmingham to Worcester via Kidderminster line, whilst GWR run a limited service between Hereford and London Paddington via Oxford.

As this station has a short platform, passengers can only alight at Colwall from the front 4 carriages of the train.

Preceding station	National Rail	Following station
Ledbury	West Midlands Railway; Birmingham-Hereford	Great Malvern
Ledbury	West Midlands Railway; Dorridge-Hereford	Great Malvern
Ledbury	Great Western Railway; Cotswold Line	Great Malvern
