= Carwardine =

Carwardine is an English surname, originally given to people from Carden, Cheshire. Notable people with the surname include:

- Anthony Carwardine (born 1938), Australian naval officer
- George Carwardine (1887–1947), designer known for the Anglepoise lamp
- Mark Carwardine (born 1959), British zoologist
- Penelope Carwardine (c.1730–1804), English miniature painter, married name Penelope Butler
- Richard Carwardine (born 1947), Welsh historian
