= Ledbury railway station =

Railway station in Herefordshire, England

Ledbury
- Ledbury station in 2026

General information
- Location: Ledbury, Herefordshire, England
- Coordinates: 52.045°N 2.425°W
- Grid reference: SO709386
- Manager: West Midlands Railway
- Platforms: 2

Other information
- Station code: LED
- Classification: DfT category E

History
- Opened: September 1861

Passengers
- 2020/21: ▼67,320
- 2021/22: ▲0.163 million
- 2022/23: ▲0.188 million
- 2023/24: ▼0.185 million
- 2024/25: ▲0.195 million
Location
Notes
- Passenger statistics from the Office of Rail and Road

Ledbury railway station serves the town of Ledbury, in Herefordshire, England. It is a stop on the Worcester to Hereford line between Colwall and Hereford, 136 miles 9 chains (219.1 km) from London Paddington, measured via Oxford.

== History ==
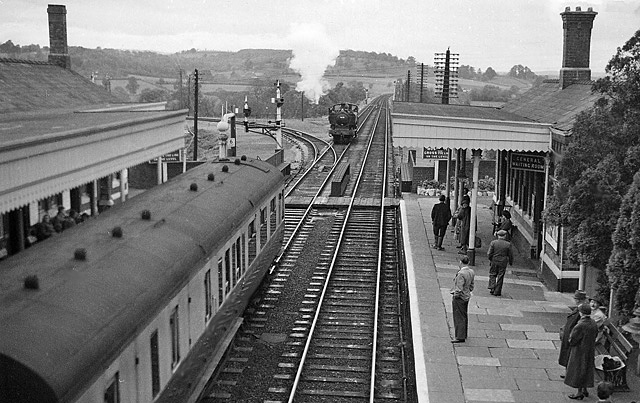
The station in 1958, with the branch to Gloucester leaving the main line on the left

The line was built by the Worcester and Hereford Railway, although it was the West Midland Railway which opened the station on either 13 or 15 September 1861. A branch line from Ledbury to Gloucester, via Dymock and Newent, opened in July 1885. The Newent branch was closed in 1959.

The station master's house is on the approach to the station forecourt and is Grade II listed.

== Facilities ==
The modern station comprises two platforms with waiting shelters and car parking facilities; it is unusual in having a privately run ticket office.

== Passenger volume ==
Passenger Volume at Ledbury
| | 2002–03 | 2004–05 | 2005–06 | 2006–07 | 2007–08 | 2008–09 | 2009–10 | 2010–11 | 2011–12 | 2012–13 | 2013–14 | 2014–15 | 2015–16 | 2016–17 | 2017–18 | 2018–19 | 2019–20 | 2020–21 | 2021–22 | 2022–23 |
|---|---|---|---|---|---|---|---|---|---|---|---|---|---|---|---|---|---|---|---|---|
| Entries and exits | 133,968 | 130,403 | 135,033 | 147,496 | 162,588 | 180,136 | 184,340 | 189,308 | 193,952 | 185,588 | 195,348 | 203,612 | 214,632 | 210,098 | 216,606 | 218,822 | 218,858 | 67,320 | 162,662 | 187,960 |

The statistics cover twelve month periods that start in April.

== Services ==
Ledbury is served by two train operating companies; the general off-peak service pattern in trains per hour/day is:

West Midlands Railway

- 1 tph to Birmingham New Street, via Worcester Foregate Street
- 1 tph to Hereford.

Great Western Railway

- 4 tpd to London Paddington, via Worcester Shrub Hill, Oxford and Reading
- 4 tpd to Hereford.

| Preceding station | National Rail | Following station |
|---|---|---|
| Hereford | West Midlands Railway; Birmingham-Hereford | Colwall |
| Hereford | West Midlands Railway; Dorridge-Hereford | Colwall |
| Hereford | Great Western Railway; Cotswold Line | Colwall |
| | Historical railways | |
| Ashperton | Great Western Railway; Worcester and Hereford Railway | Colwall |
| | Disused railways | |
| Ledbury Town Halt | Great Western Railway; Ledbury and Gloucester Railway | Terminus |

== Bibliography ==
- Marshall, Geoff; Pipe, Vicki (2018). The Railway Adventures: Places, Trains, People and Stations. September Publishing. ISBN 978-1910463871.
- Quick, Michael (2023). Railway Passenger Stations in Great Britain: A Chronology (PDF) (5th ed.). London: Railway and Canal Historical Society.
