= Withington, Herefordshire =

Village in Herefordshire, England

Coordinates: 52.085°N 2.637°W

Withington
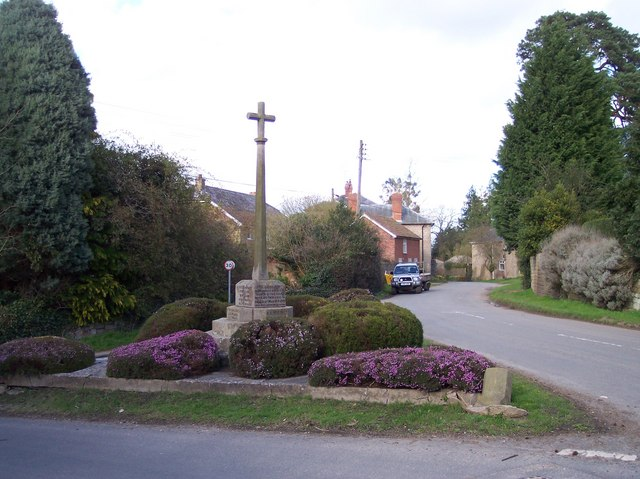
- Withington War Memorial

- Location within Herefordshire
- Population: 1,588 (2011)(Parish)
- OS grid reference: SO563431
  - London: 180 km
- Civil parish: Withington
- Unitary authority: Herefordshire
- Ceremonial county: Herefordshire
- Region: West Midlands
- Country: England
- Sovereign state: United Kingdom
- Post town: HEREFORD
- Postcode district: HR1
- Dialling code: 01432
- Police: West Mercia
- Fire: Hereford and Worcester
- Ambulance: West Midlands
- UK Parliament: North Herefordshire

Withington is a village and civil parish in Herefordshire, England, about 5 miles (8 km) north-east of Hereford at grid reference SO563431.

== History ==
One of the historical features of Withington is the Roman mile post situated on the Worcester road. The only thing that can still be read on it is "This is the road to Hereford"; it was part of a cross but was made into a mile stone in 1700.

Withington also has a church a small primary school, and the Cross Keys pub. It is a small village surrounded by fields, but has a growing population with new houses being built.

Withington used to be home to the Meadow Market, a supermarket that serviced the local community, and it was later bought and renamed by the Normans Super-Warehouse chain. This became the northernmost branch of Normans. The store was opened in May 1971 by farmer and television personality Ted Moult. It closed in 1998 and became several smaller shops on the newly named Withington Retail estate. The site now stands as a housing estate.

== Landmarks ==
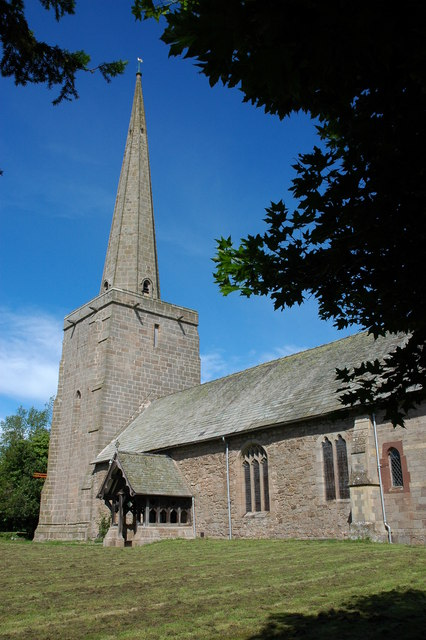
Withington Church

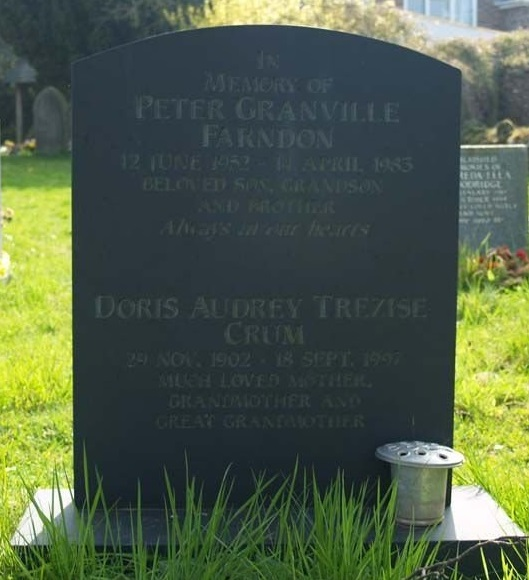
Pete Farndon gravesite

The village church is dedicated to St Peter and has a tall, slender spire on a late 13th-century tower. There are Norman doorways to the nave and windows in Early English, Decorated and Perpendicular styles. In the churchyard, north-east of the building, are the Commonwealth war graves of a Royal Fusiliers soldier of World War I and a Royal Air Force airman and WAAF airwoman of World War II. Guitarist Pete Farndon of The Pretenders (died 1983) is also buried there.

== Railway reopening ==
There are proposals to reopen the railway station on the Cotswold Line at Withington.

== People ==
- William Saxey, a judge who served for many years on the Irish Bench as Chief Justice of Munster, was buried at St. Peter's Church in 1612.
- Pete Farndon, bassist and founding member of the rock band The Pretenders is buried at St. Peter's Church.
- Rachel Whitear, student.
