= Penelope Carwardine =

English miniature painter

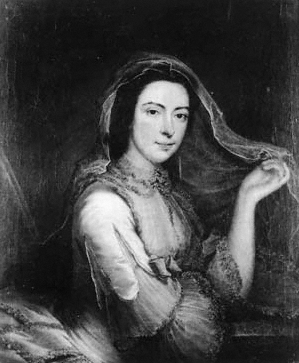
- A portrait of Carwardine by Thomas Bardwell
- Born: Withington, Herefordshire, England
- Baptised: 29 April 1729
- Died: 14 October 1805; Herefordshire, England
- Burial place: Preston Wynne, Herefordshire, England
- Occupation: miniature painter
- Years active: 1750–1790

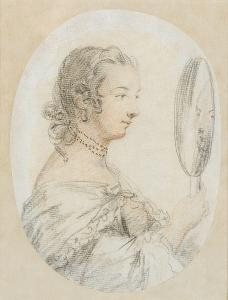
A miniature by Carwardine

Penelope Carwardine (c. 1729 – 14 October 1805; married name Penelope Butler) was an English portrait miniature painter.

== Early life ==
Penelope Carwardine was baptised on 29 April 1729 at Withington, Herefordshire, England. She was one of eight children born to John Carwardine of Thinghills Court and his wife, Anne Bullock of Preston Wynne. With her father having ruined the family estates, Carwardine took to miniature painting to generate an income for the family.

== Career ==
According to the Dictionary of National Biography and other sources, she was instructed by Ozias Humphrey, and mastered miniature painting in 1754. However, Humphrey was not born until 1742, so there is a possibility that Carwardine was teaching Humphrey and the information was muddled over time. Her mother was also a miniature painter, and the two of them exhibited miniatures at the Incorporated Society of Artists in London in 1761 and 1762 under the name "Mrs Thomas Carwardine (Anne)." Carwardine went on to exhibit there in 1771 and 1772.

Carwardine belonged to the Modest School of English miniaturists, a group that also included Peter Paul Lens and Gervase Spencer. The majority of her miniatures date between 1750 and 1785–90 and are usually signed PC, which has been argued stand for her pseudonym Penelope Cotes.

Carwardine was a close friend of the painters Joshua Reynolds and Frances Reynolds; and among Sir Joshua's works is a portrait of one of her sisters, painted by him as a present for her. Many of her miniatures remained in the possession of her family as of 1887, together with three portraits of Carwardine: one by Thomas Bardwell, 1750; one by a Chinese artist, about 1756; the third by George Romney, about 1790.

== Marriage ==
On 26 May 1773, Carwardine married James Butler, the organist at the Church of St. Margaret's, Westminster and at the Church of St. James, Piccadilly in London.

== Death ==
Carwardine was widowed around 1800. She died on 14 October 1805 and was buried at Preston Wynne, Herefordshire.

== Bibliography ==
- This article incorporates text from a publication now in the public domain: Humphreys, Jennett (1887). "Carwardine, Penelope". In Stephen, Leslie (ed.). Dictionary of National Biography. Vol. 9. London: Smith, Elder & Co. p. 239.
