= Gervase Spencer =

English painter

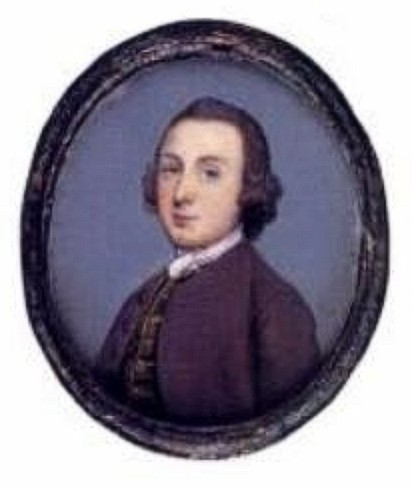
Self-portrait (1749)

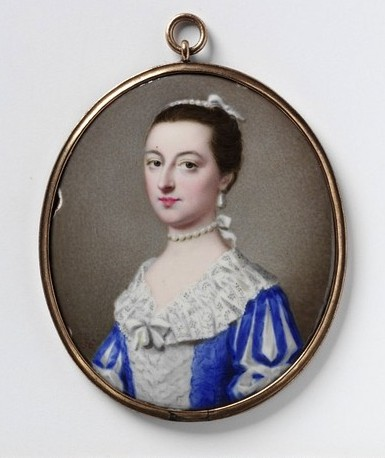
Portrait miniature of an unknown woman by Gervase Spencer, enamel on metal, Victoria and Albert Museum, 1756

Gervase Spencer (c.1715–1763), was an English miniaturist.

== Biography ==
Gervase Spencer was an English miniaturist. Originally a footman to a "Dr W," Spencer taught himself the art of painting in watercolour on ivory, and was encouraged by his employer. Since enamels were in vogue at the time, he also mastered the complexities of this process. Spencer's prodigious output is divided almost equally between enamels and ivory. Spencer's early work closely resembles that of Jean-André Rouquet (1701 - 1758) and may well have been influenced by him. His first works date from the early 1740s, about the time that he would heve been employed as a servant, with the majority of his production coming between 1745 and 1761. Spencer trained Henry Spicer (1743 - 1804) and possibly Penelope Carwardine (1729 - 1804) to continue the tradition and art of miniatures on enamel and ivory. Spencer met many of the leading London artists of his days including Sir Joshua Reynods (1732 - 1792) who took his portrait. His status was such that in 1763, the year of his death, he was one of only twenty-four miniaturists listed in Mortimer's Universal Director, a directory of leading professionals of all trades. He was a very fair artist and generally signed his works G. S. Spencer married her intimate friend and his only daughter had a husband whose surname was Lloyd. He chiefly showed female sitters and painted with thinly diffused tints, over a delicate grey under.

== Works ==
- Lady Gower, née Elizabeth Fazakerley. Signed and dated on the front GS 1745.
- Lady Caroline Fox. Enemel signed and dated on the back 1747.
- Sir James MacDonald. Enemel signed and dated on the front GS 1747.
- Nathaniel Ryder, 1st Baron Harrowby (1735–1803). Signed on the front: 'GS 1748'.
- Susan Ashley-Cooper Noel (1710–1758) the daughter of Baptist Noel,3rd Earl of Gainsborough,1748 ca, ivory signed on the obverse.
- Martha North, Signed and dated on the back 1749.
- Marguerite Madeleine de Cerjat born Stample in London (3/4/1736 – 25/4/1813). Signed and dated on the front GS 1749.
- Margaret Woffington (known as Peg) (1714–1760). Signed and dated on the front GS 1750.
- Lady Louisa Augusta Greville (born 1743). Signed and dated on the front GS 1751.
- Unknown Lady. Signed and dated on the back J Spencer pinx 1752. Victoria & Albert Museum, London.
- François Duquesnoy (1579–1643). Signed with initials and dated 'G S 1752' enamel on copper.
- George, 3rd Duke of St. Albans. Signed with initials and dated 'G.S 1753'.
- Susannah Beckford (née Love) (died 1803). Signed on the counter-enamel and dated G. Spencer pinxit/ 1755.
- Countess of Coventry. Enamel, signed with initials and dated 1757 on the obverse and in full on the reverse.
- Henry Vansittart (1756–1786). Signed and dated on the front GS 1760.
- Isabella Dalton (née Wray, 1731–1780). Signed and dated 1761.
