= Christopher Calladine =

British engineer (1935–2025)

Christopher Reuben Calladine FRS FREng (19 January 1935 – 3 August 2025) was a British engineer, emeritus professor at University of Cambridge, and fellow of Peterhouse, Cambridge.

Calladine died on 3 August 2025, at the age of 90.

== Works ==
- Plasticity for engineers: theory and applications. Horwood Publishing. 2000. ISBN 978-1-898563-70-9.
- Theory of Shell Structures. Cambridge University Press. 1989. ISBN 978-0-521-36945-9.
- Understanding DNA. Academic Press. 2004. ISBN 978-0-12-155089-9.
