= Hereford railway station =

Railway station in Herefordshire, England

Hereford
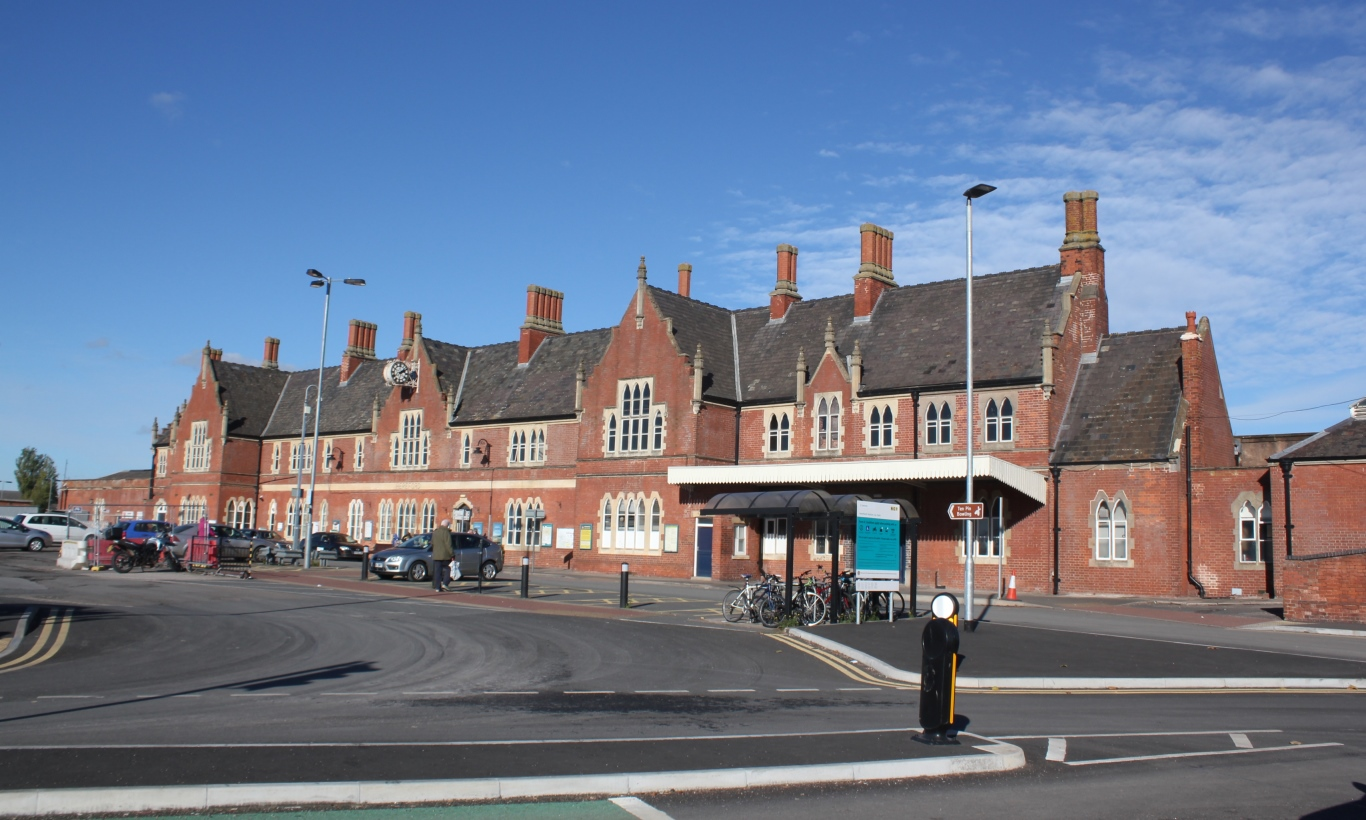

General information
- Location: Hereford, Herefordshire; England
- Coordinates: 52°03′41″N 2°42′30″W
- Grid reference: SO515405
- Managed by: Transport for Wales
- Platforms: 4

Other information
- Station code: HFD
- Classification: DfT category C1

History
- Original company: Shrewsbury and Hereford Railway
- Pre-grouping: Shrewsbury and Hereford Railway
- Post-grouping: Shrewsbury and Hereford Railway

Key dates
- 6 December 1853: Opened as Hereford Barr's Court
- 1893: Renamed Hereford

Passengers
- 2020/21: ▼0.500 million
- Interchange: ▼7,585
- 2021/22: ▲1.003 million
- Interchange: ▲31,474
- 2022/23: ▲1.117 million
- Interchange: ▲38,364
- 2023/24: ▲1.161 million
- Interchange: ▲43,926
- 2024/25: ▲1.230 million
- Interchange: ▲45,539
Location
Notes
- Passenger statistics from the Office of Rail and Road

Hereford railway station serves the city of Hereford, in Herefordshire, England. Managed by Transport for Wales, it lies on the Welsh Marches Line, between Leominster and Abergavenny; it is also the western terminus of the Cotswold Line, for services to Birmingham New Street. The station has four platforms for passenger trains and two additional relief lines for goods services.

== History ==
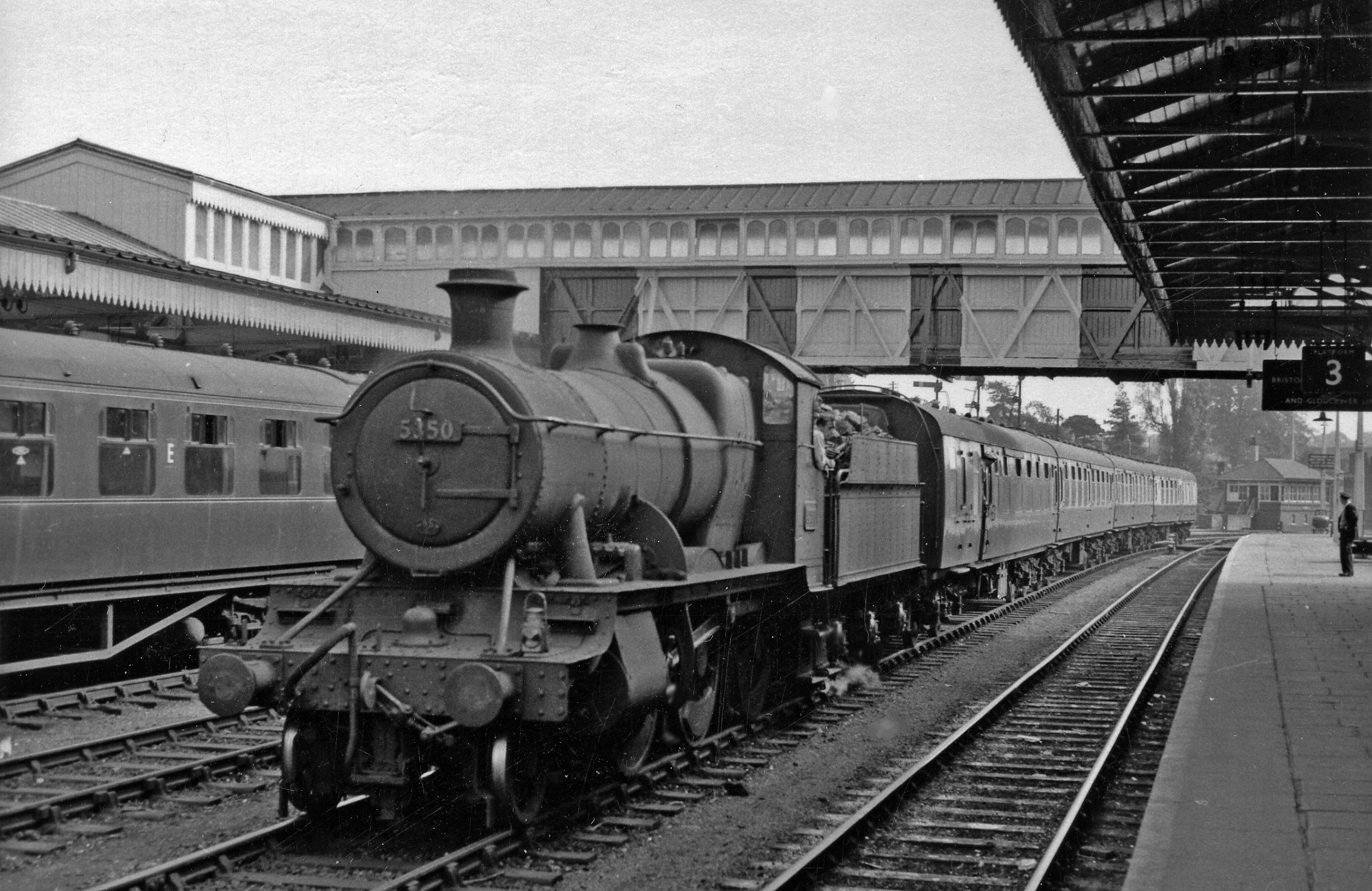
2-6-0 on pilot duty in 1959

There were originally two stations in Hereford: Barton and Barrs Court.

Hereford Barton lay to the west of the city (Note: Co-ordinates for the former site of Barton station are: 52.0563°N 2.7245°W) and had been built by the Newport, Abergavenny and Hereford Railway (NA&HR). However, Barton was small and in a cramped location; it was not big enough nor could it be enlarged for the greater traffic that would entail from the arrival of the Shrewsbury and Hereford Railway from the north.

The resolution was an agreement to create a new joint railway station to the north-east of the city, called Hereford Barrs Court. This would be a joint standard gauge/broad gauge station, sponsored jointly by the standard-gauge Shrewsbury & Hereford Railway (S&HR) and the GWR-sponsored Hereford, Ross and Gloucester Railway (HR&GR). When the Midland Railway sponsored Hereford, Hay and Brecon Railway entered the town, they were given access rights, as was the later Worcester and Hereford Railway, which joined the S&HR's route to the north of the city at Shelwick Junction.

In the civil engineering preparation for this, and as the only company planning to enter the town from the north, the S&HR built a brick works north of Dinmore Hill in 1849, which was fed by clay from the earthworks of digging a tunnel south underneath it. In 1852, 2 1/2 years later and having used 3 1/4 million bricks the tunnel was completed, freight traffic started in July 1852 to provide cash flow. However, construction continued, with the massive earthworks for a cutting to enter Barrs Court started in August 1852.

The plan was to jointly open both stations between all four railways on 6 December 1853, with what was planned to be a Railway Fete. However, the first S&HR passenger service arrived at Barrs Court on Saturday 28 October, which carried the chairman Mr Ormsby-Gore and engineer Thomas Brassey. As the negotiations and financing of the joint station had taken so long, they arrived at an incomplete facility. Whilst completion of the station would follow shortly after, significant rebuilding would occur later in the nineteenth century, when the current Victorian Gothic buildings, designed by R.E. Johnson, would be constructed. The station opened on 6 December 1853 and the name was simplified to Hereford in 1893, on the closure of Barton station to passengers.

The clock by J. B. Joyce & Co was installed on the frontage in 1857.

In 1866, a line connecting the NA&HR's route to the south of the city, branching off from the line to Barton at Redhill and joining with the HR&GR's route into Barrs Court station from the south, rendered Barton station obsolete, as through north–south services could now utilise the larger and better equipped Barrs Court station. However, Barton clung onto passenger services until January 1893, the last services to use it being Midland Railway trains to Hay-on-Wye and Brecon Free Street. It would remain open as a goods-only station until 1979; the route through it from north to south was used as a goods-only line to avoid Barrs Court, also remained until approximately this time.

The former branches to Brecon via Hay-on-Wye and Gloucester both closed to passenger traffic in the early 1960s; Brecon services were withdrawn from 31 December 1962, whilst the Gloucester via Ross-on-Wye line fell victim to the Beeching Axe on 2 November 1964.

The station was designated a Grade II listed building in 1973.

== Facilities ==
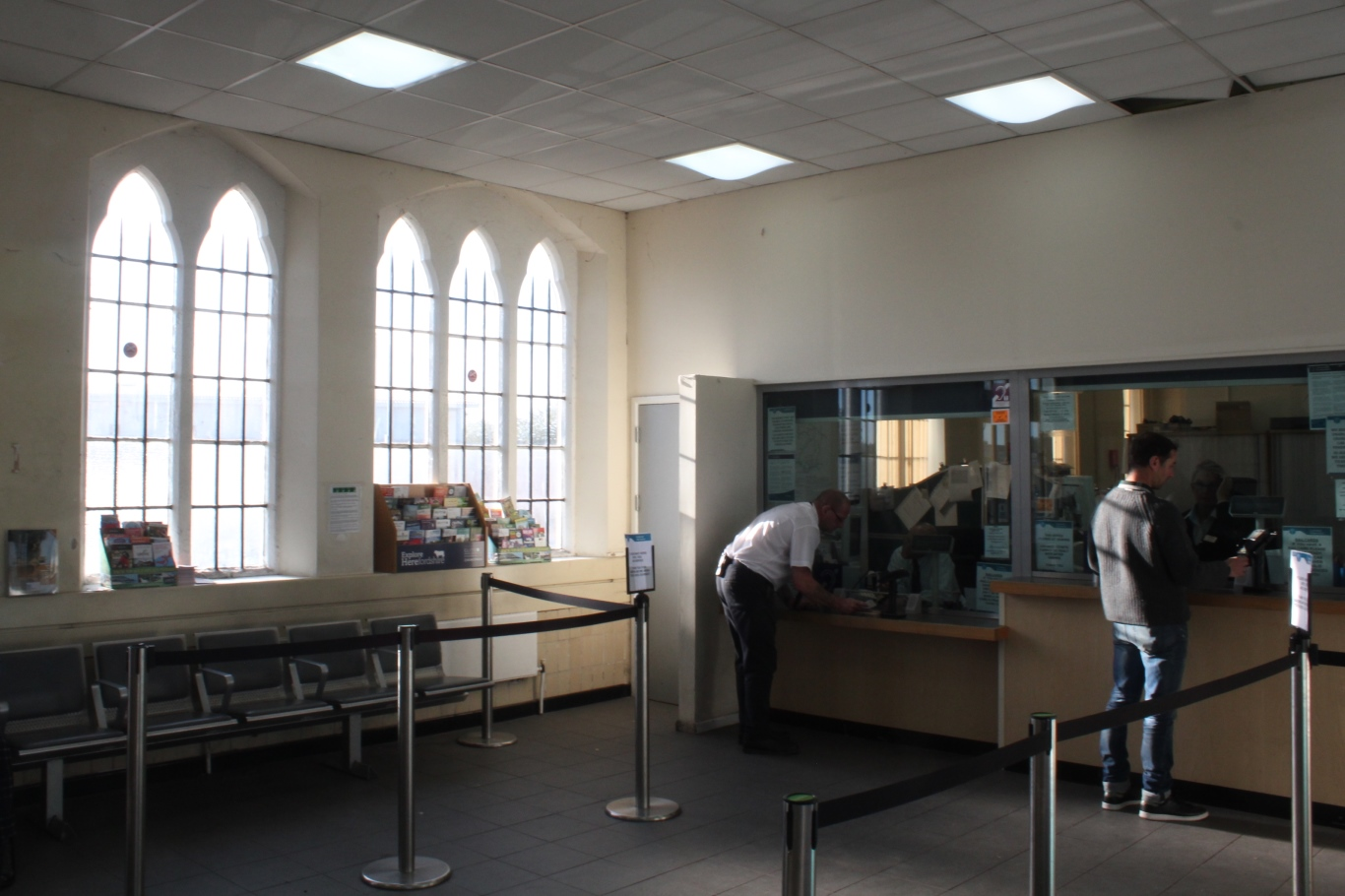
The ticket hall in 2018

The station is staffed seven days a week, with a ticket office, café, waiting rooms and self-service ticket machines available. There is a 146-space car park and 50 spaces for bicycles.

It was accorded Secure Station status in 2004 and automated ticket barriers have been in operation since 28 February 2006.

== Services ==
Hereford is served by three train operating companies:

- Great Western Railway operates 4 tpd (trains per day) to London Paddington, via Worcester Foregate Street
- Transport for Wales operates 1 tph (trains per hour) between Manchester Piccadilly and Cardiff Central, of which 1 tp2h runs further to Carmarthen. In addition, 1 tp2h runs between Cardiff Central and Holyhead
- West Midlands Trains runs 1 tph to Birmingham New Street.

On Sundays, the service to Birmingham New Street is reduced to 1 tp2h, the service to London Paddington is reduced to 3 tpd and the service to Holyhead is reduced to 2 tpd.

Preceding station	National Rail	Following station
Abergavenny	Transport for Wales Welsh Marches line	Leominster
Abergavenny	Transport for Wales Premier Service	Ludlow
Terminus	West Midlands Railway; Hereford to Birmingham	Ledbury
Terminus	West Midlands Railway; Hereford to Dorridge	Ledbury
Terminus	Great Western Railway; Cotswold Line	Ledbury
	Historical railways	
Holme Lacy	Hereford, Ross and Gloucester Railway; British Railways	Terminus

== See also ==
- Herefordshire and Gloucestershire Canal
