= Cotswold Line =

Railway line in England

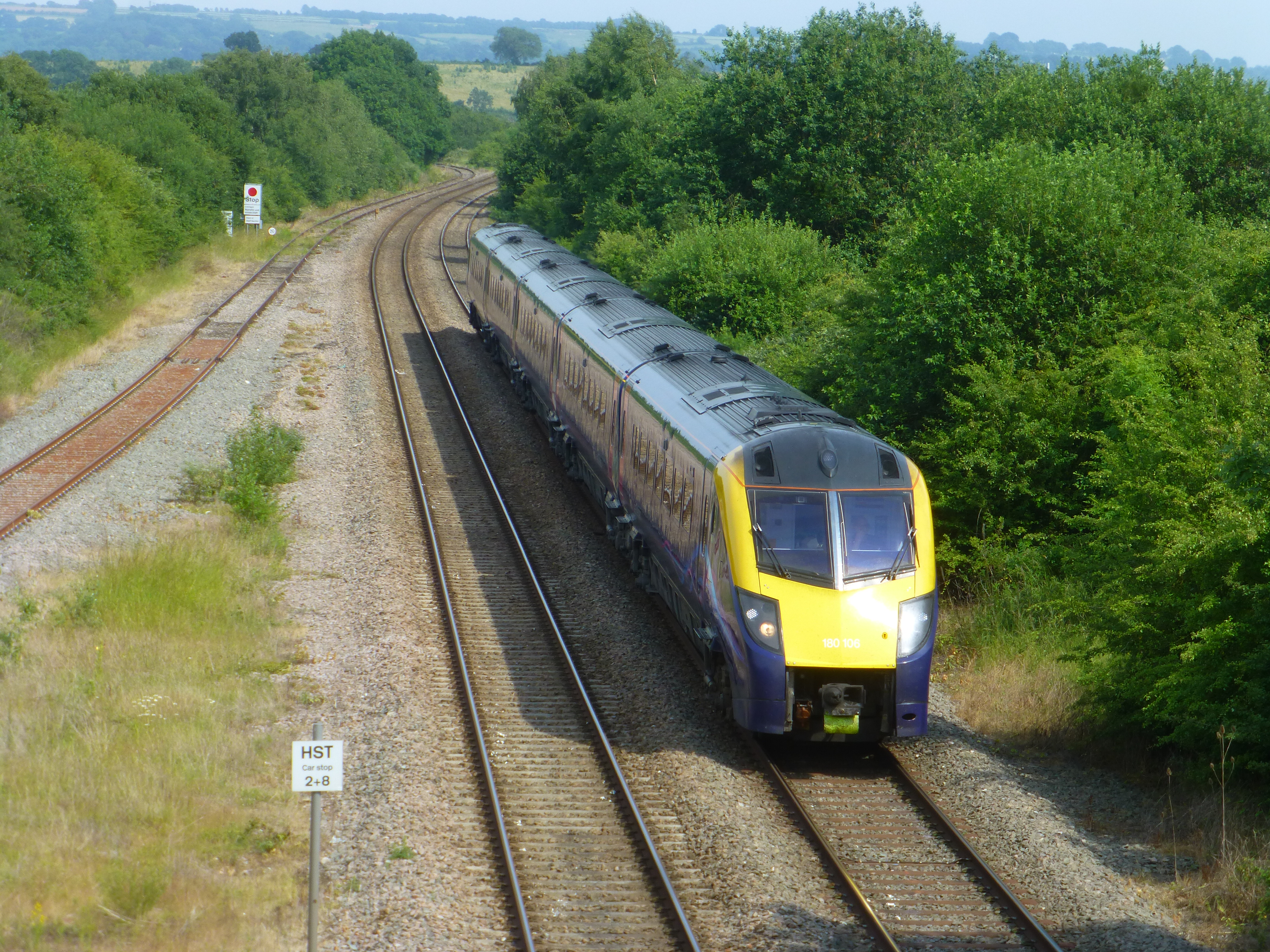
- A First Great Western Class 180 approaches Honeybourne station in June 2017

Overview
- Status: Operational
- Owner: Network Rail
- Locale: South East England; South West England; West Midlands
- Termini: Oxford; Hereford
- Stations: 19

Service
- Type: Rural, Heavy rail
- System: National Rail
- Operators: Great Western Railway; West Midlands Trains
- Rolling stock: Class 150; Class 158; Class 165; Class 166; Class 170; Class 172; Class 196; Class 800; Class 802

History
- Opened: 1851

Technical
- Line length: 86.3 miles (138.9 km)
- Num of tracks: 1–2
- Track gauge: 4 ft 8 1/2 in (1,435 mm) standard gauge
- Operating speed: 100 mph (160 km/h) maximum
Route map
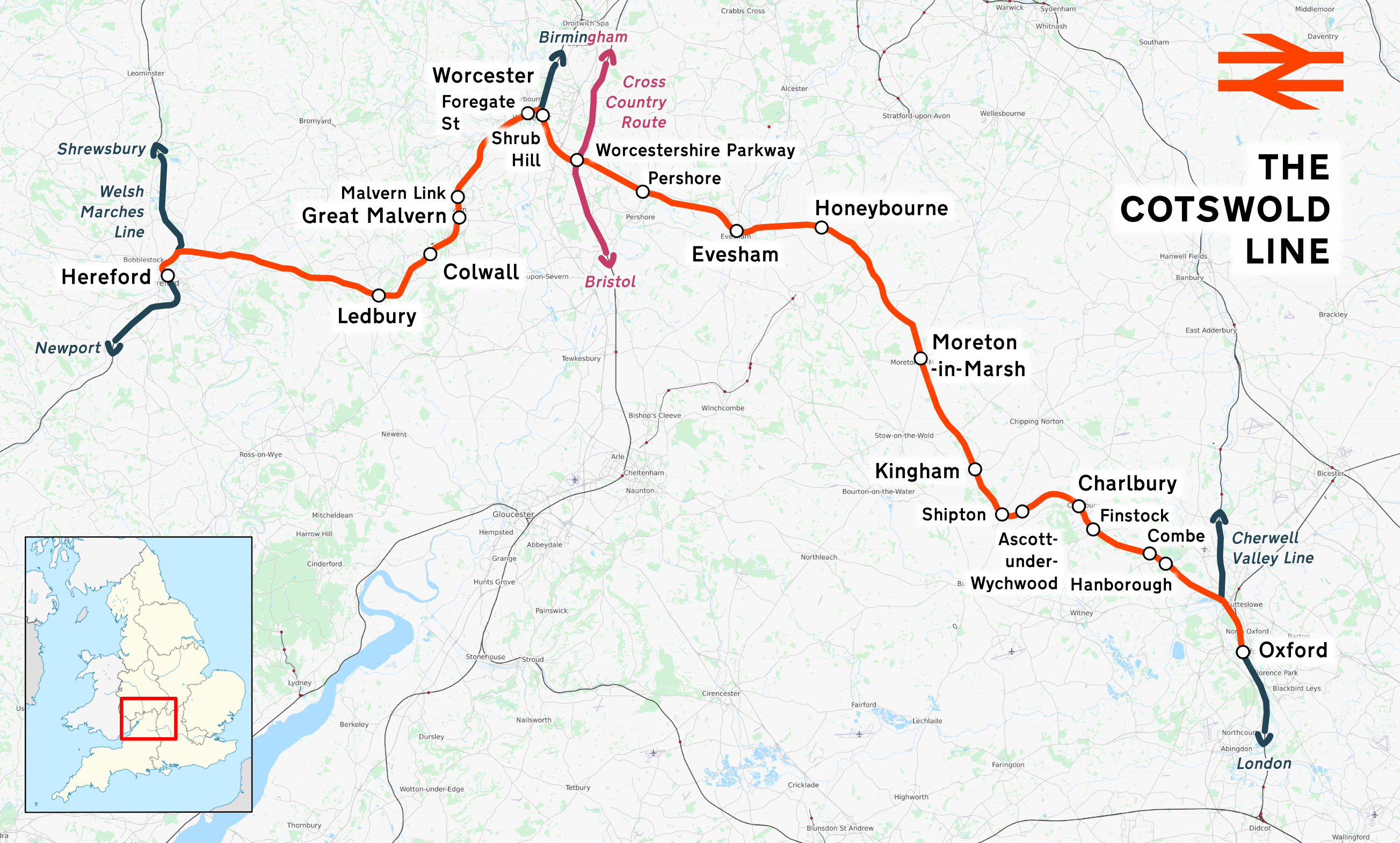
(Click to expand)

The Cotswold Line is an 86 1/2-mile (139.2 km) railway line between Oxford and Hereford in England.

== History ==
=== Early years ===
The line between Oxford and Worcester was built under the Oxford, Worcester and Wolverhampton Railway Act 1845 (8 & 9 Vict. c. clxxxiv) and opened in 1851 as part of the Oxford, Worcester and Wolverhampton Railway.

The act required the line to be built to Isambard Kingdom Brunel's 7 feet 1/4 inch (2,140 mm) broad gauge but delays, disputes and increasing costs led to its being completed as 4 ft 8 1/2 in (1,435 mm) standard gauge.

The first stage of the Worcester and Hereford Railway opened between Henwick and Malvern Link on 25 July 1859. The bridge over the River Severn was approved for traffic the following year, and trains started running through from Malvern Link to Worcester Shrub Hill station on 17 May 1860. A short extension from Malvern Link to Malvern Wells opened on 25 May 1860.

On 1 July 1860 the Oxford, Worcester and Wolverhampton Railway absorbed both the Worcester and Hereford Railway and the Newport, Abergavenny and Hereford Railway to form the West Midland Railway.

On 13 September 1861 the final stage of the railway opened between Malvern Wells and Shelwick Junction. This junction is just north of Hereford station on the line between Hereford and Shrewsbury, and it finally created a through route between Worcester and Hereford.

The Great Western Railway took over the West Midland Railway in 1863.

The original tunnel through the ridge of the Malvern Hills, Colwall Tunnel, was completed in July 1860. However, the tunnel was unstable, and it was closed for short periods in 1861 and again in 1907 following rock falls. Eventually the GWR decided to build a new tunnel to the south of the existing one. This opened for traffic on 2 August 1926. The old tunnel was abandoned, and during World War II it was used to store ammunition.

In the early 1970s, 25 miles from Moreton-in-Marsh to Norton Junction, Worcester were converted from double to single track.

Following serious floods, which washed parts of embankments away, the line was closed for about a fortnight during July and August 2007 for repairs.

=== Improvement works 2008–2011 ===
Network Rail completed the redoubling of 20 miles (32 km) of track from just east of Charlbury to Ascott-under-Wychwood, and from Moreton-in-Marsh to about 1 mile (1.6 km) west of Evesham on 22 August 2011. This was intended to improve reliability, enable non-stop operations and allow an hourly off peak service to run on the line. The Office of Rail Regulation approved the work in June 2008, although the planned work was over-budget and had to await final approval. In December 2008 vegetation was cleared. A six-week closure of all or part of the line between Oxford and Worcester for preparatory works took place in July and August 2009. Further weekend work planned for February 2010 was postponed by Network Rail. Initial work began in autumn of 2010, with the majority of the second track being relaid between December 2010 and May 2011 when the line was closed at 21.30 from Monday to Thursday. In March 2011 construction works were started on additional structures and signalling equipment that the new line needed, including three new platforms at Charlbury, Ascott-under-Wychwood and Honeybourne. Footbridges at Charlbury and Honeybourne as well as preparation for the upgrade of six Level Crossings. The new double track section between Charlbury and Ascott re-opened on 6 June 2011; the line between Oxford and Moreton-in-Marsh having been closed during the previous nine days. The section between Moreton and Evesham reopened as double track on 22 August 2011 with the line closed for the preceding two weeks.

=== Platform extensions 2018 ===
The line was closed from 16 to 25 November 2018, between Moreton-In-Marsh and Worcester Shrub Hill, so that platforms could be extended to accommodate Class 800 trains.

=== Opening of Worcestershire Parkway 2020 ===
Worcestershire Parkway railway station opened in February 2020, following a long-standing proposal for a new split-level station where the line crosses over the Birmingham and Bristol Railway route. Connecting services are provided by CrossCountry on the Cardiff to Nottingham line and there is parking for 483 cars.

== Route ==
The line comprises all or part of the following Network Rail routes:

- GW 200 from Oxford
- GW 310 from Wolvercot Junction
- GW 300 from Norton Junction
- GW 340 from Worcester Shrub Hill
- GW 730 from Shelwick Junction to Hereford

=== Infrastructure ===
The line is single track between the following places:

- Wolvercot Junction, (about 3 miles or 5 kilometres north of Oxford) and Charlbury.
- 1 mile or 1.6 kilometres west of Evesham and Norton Junction (3 miles or 4.8 kilometres south east of Worcester Shrub Hill)
- Worcester Shrub Hill through Worcester Foregate Street to Henwick.
- Malvern Wells, (1 mile or 1.6 kilometres south of Great Malvern) and Shelwick Junction (1.7 miles or 2.7 kilometres north of Hereford) with a crossing place at Ledbury.

Other sections are double track.

Significant civil engineering structures on the line include Campden Tunnel (875 yards or 800 metres), the Colwall Tunnels (1,567 yards or 1,433 metres), Ledbury Tunnel (1,323 yards or 1,210 metres) and viaducts at Worcester and Ledbury.

=== Detail ===
==== Oxford to Charlbury ====
After departing Oxford station, the Cotswold Line shares track with the Cherwell Valley Line to Banbury. About 220 yards (200 m) north of the station, the line crosses the Sheepwash Channel which links the Castle Mill Stream and Oxford Canal with the River Thames. Immediately east of the current line is the Rewley Road Swing Bridge over the channel which used to carry the London and North Western Railway's (LNWR) Buckinghamshire Railway line to its terminus at Oxford Rewley Road. The swing bridge is a listed building. The Rewley Road station building has been dismantled and re-erected at Buckinghamshire Railway Centre. The built up area east of the railway, visible across the Oxford Canal, is Jericho, a district which originated as lodgings outside the city walls where travellers could rest if they arrived after the gates were locked. The Eagle Ironworks of William Lucy & Co. was near the first road bridge over the track on Walton Well Road.

After the bridge, the open area to the left is Port Meadow, a water meadow bordering the Thames with a Bronze Age round barrow. The former LNWR Buckinghamshire Railway branches away to the north east. The section from Oxford to Bicester has been connected to the Chiltern Main Line by a new chord at Bicester, enabling through trains from Oxford to London Marylebone to run from September 2015. Proposals exist for re-opening the whole line and are included in the Draft Milton Keynes & South Midlands Sub-Regional Strategy, but there are many planning and funding matters to be resolved.

The line passes through Wolvercote. To the west, Lower Wolvercote was a centre for paper making, mainly for the Oxford University Press from the 17th century until 1998 and is the site of Godstow Abbey, a Benedictine convent founded in the 12th century. The line passes under the viaduct carrying the A34 Oxford Western Bypass and 100 yards (91 m) further under the A40 road linking London and Fishguard.

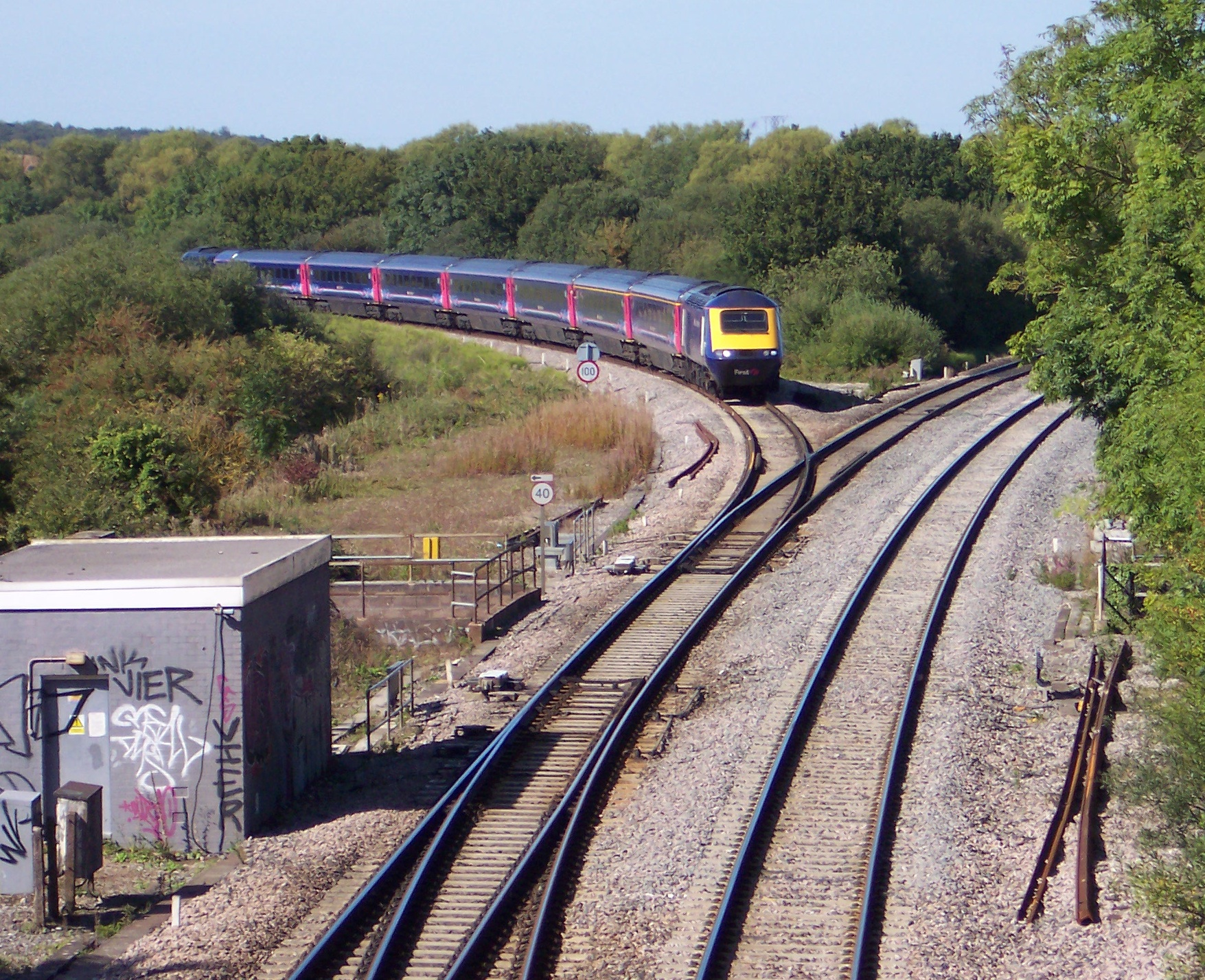
An HST leaving the Cotswold Line at Wolvercot Junction, about 3 miles (5 km) north of Oxford

The line now turns west; here the former Buckinghamshire Junction Railway link with the Buckinghamshire Railway used to converge from the east. About 4 miles (6.4 km) after Oxford station, Yarnton station was in the short stretch between here and where the Witney Railway diverged to the south-west. So far, the line has been close to the River Thames but the river now swings away to the south through a landscape dotted with gravel pits. The line now climbs the valley of the River Evenlode repeatedly crossing and re-crossing the river. Hanborough station serves the villages of Long Hanborough, Church Hanborough, Freeland and Bladon. The Oxford Bus Museum is next to Hanborough station.

From Hanborough the line enters the Cotswold Area of Outstanding Natural Beauty and 1 mile (1.6 km) beyond Hanborough is Combe station. Building the line through Combe was difficult with several deep cuttings, four crossings of the Evenlode, and the diversion of a length of the river. To the south, just after the third river crossing are the remains of North Leigh Roman Villa. About 1 mile (1.6 km) beyond the villa the line crosses the course of Akeman Street Roman road. The Oxfordshire Way long-distance footpath follows Akeman Street from the north east to a point about 0.6 miles (1 km) north of the railway before turning to run through Stonesfield and meet the line at Charlbury station. The next station is Finstock. Between Finstock and Charlbury the deer park to the west of the line is Cornbury Park, original venue for the Cornbury Music Festival, which has now been replaced by the Wilderness Festival. The woodlands south west of the park are the remains of Wychwood Forest named after the Hwicce, one of the Anglo-Saxon peoples of Britain. Charlbury station is the start of the redoubled track and is first stop for faster trains over the line and retains its original Oxford, Worcester and Wolverhampton Railway clapperboard building. Sir Peter Parker lived nearby at Minster Lovell and was a regular user of Charlbury station while chairman of the British Railways Board (1976 to 1983). The patronage of the head of the organisation may have helped to save the line at a time when the Serpell Report was calling for more rail closures. This is section of track has a maximum speed of 100 mph (160 km/h)

==== Charlbury to Moreton-in-Marsh ====
The line is now heading south-west and the site of Ascot d'Oilly Castle is to the north-west as the train enters Ascott-under-Wychwood. Few trains call at Ascott-under-Wychwood station, but there is a signal box controlling the level crossing and the points that were formerly the end of the single track section from Wolvercot Junction. 1.2 miles (1.9 km) beyond Ascott is Shipton station which serves the villages of Shipton-under-Wychwood, Milton-under-Wychwood and Fifield.

Still following the Evenlode, the line now turns north-west. There is another level crossing near Bruern Abbey. The next junction on the line was at Kingham from where the Banbury and Cheltenham Direct Railway went west to Cheltenham via Stow-on-the-Wold and east to King's Sutton near Banbury. Kingham village is north of the station. The village west of the station is Bledington. The Oxfordshire Way which has been close to the railway since Akeman Street now turns west to Bourton-on-the-Water but it is replaced by another long-distance footpath, the Diamond Way. Beyond Kingham, the line passes through the site of the former Adlestrop railway station, closed in 1966. At Moreton-in-Marsh the line crosses the course of another major Roman road, the Fosse Way which linked Isca Dumnoniorum (Exeter) and Lindum Colonia (Lincoln). Moreton-in-Marsh was the headquarters of the railway spot-hire company Cotswold Rail until the company moved to Gloucester.

==== Moreton-in-Marsh to Hereford ====
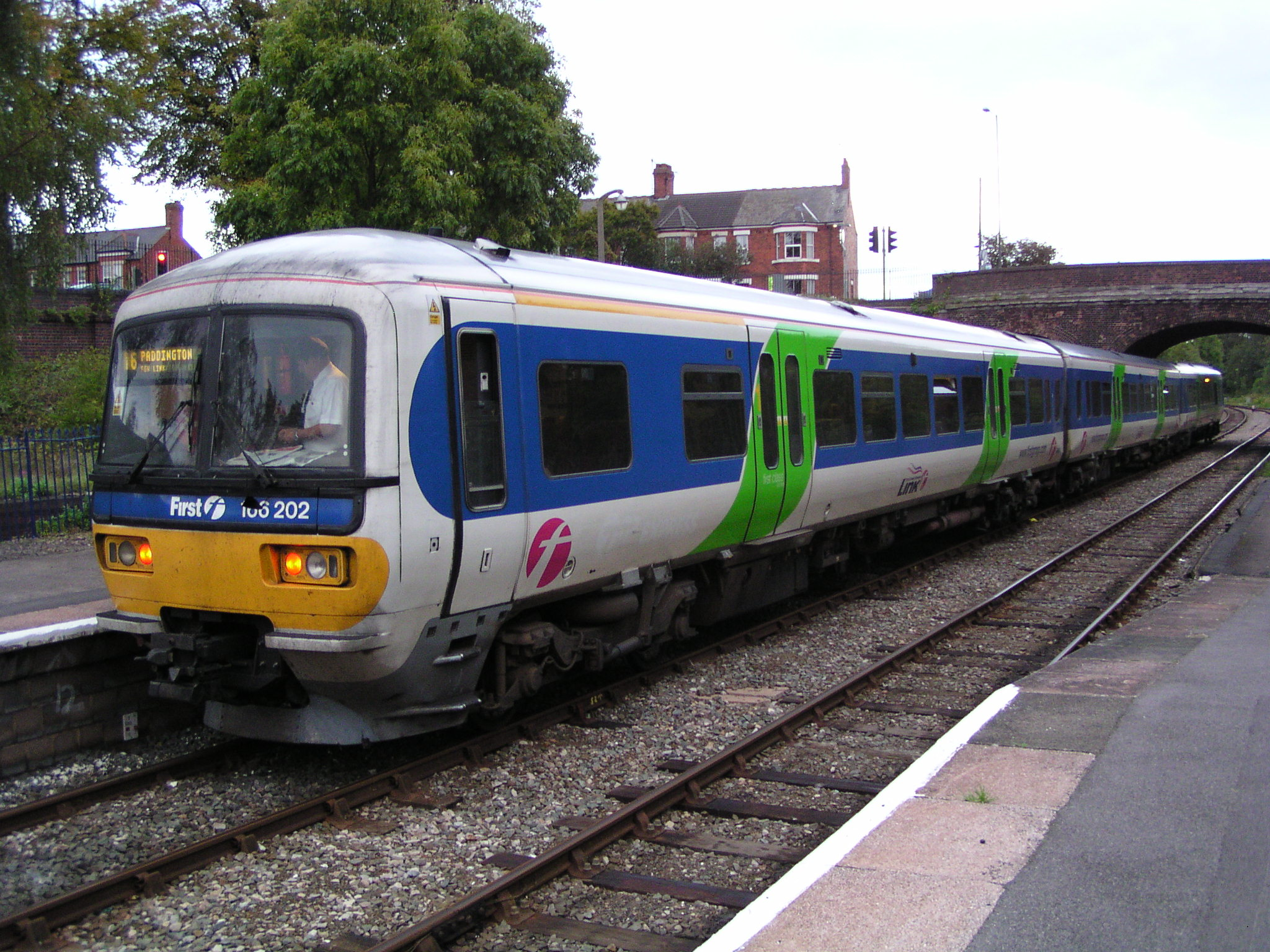
A First Great Western Link Network Express Turbo unit at Evesham station on 19 September 2004, with a service for London Paddington

About 28 miles (45 km) after Oxford is Moreton-in-Marsh. This was once the southern end of the Stratford and Moreton Tramway. The line then passes the corner of the Roman town of Dorn. The Cotswold Line leaves the Evenlode which drains into the Thames and enters the catchment of the River Severn. The first level crossing appears. The building west of the crossing is a brick works and the neighbouring pits were the site of Jurassic clay extraction for the works. The village to the north is Paxford. The large country house to the west is Northwick Park, former home of Edward Spencer-Churchill and site of a United States Army hospital during World War II and afterwards a centre for Polish refugees. The line the passes the site of Chipping Campden station, about 1 mile (1.6 km) east of Chipping Campden itself. From here the line goes into cutting, then the 887 yards (811 m) Campden Tunnel under the Cotswold escarpment. In 1851 unrest among the navvies building the tunnel resulted in a riot – the 'Battle of Campden Tunnel'.

The next station is Honeybourne. From 1905 until 1977 this was the junction with the GWR line between Cheltenham and Stratford-upon-Avon. The track to the north remains as a link to the large former military depot at Long Marston. There is a good business case for the restoration of the Stratford-Cotswolds link. The large compound to the north with high walls, chapel, and floodlights is Long Lartin prison. There is another level crossing, where Littleton and Badsey station used to be. The line crosses the River Avon into Evesham. Opposite Evesham's Cotswold Line station is the former Midland Railway station, once on the Ashchurch & Barnt Green line. The line becomes single track again about 1 mile (1.6 km) west of Evesham and then crosses the River Avon twice more and follows it towards Pershore.

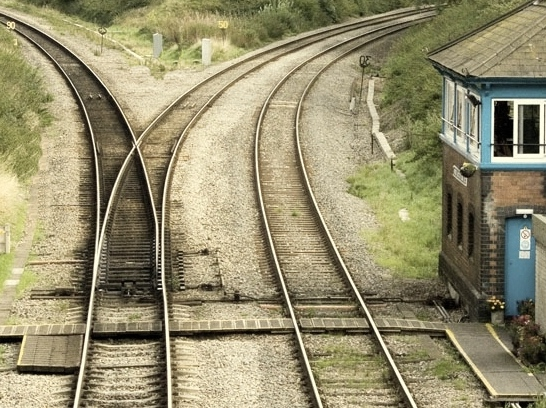
The site of Norton Junction looking towards Oxford. The single tracked Cotswold Line branches off to the left, with the right hand branch linking to the Cross Country Route (southbound).

West of Pershore, where the line crosses over the Cross Country Route, the new Worcestershire Parkway station has been opened. Just beyond, the line passes through Norton Junction where there was formerly a station. The junction links the line to the Cross Country Route. Here double track restarts.

About 57 miles (92 km) after Oxford is Worcester Shrub Hill station. Here are connections to commuter lines going to Birmingham New Street. Worcester Foregate Street station gives connections to the city centre and other lines to Birmingham. 6 miles (10 km) later the line reaches Malvern Link station. Great Malvern station follows, and 2 miles (3 km) later is the site of the former Malvern Wells station. After Malvern Wells the line enters the 1,584 yards (1,448 m) long Colwall New Tunnel. This is the second Colwall tunnel; the entrance to the original tunnel can be seen to the north. When the tunnel is below the ridge of the Malvern Hills, the line crosses the boundary between Worcestershire and Herefordshire. The line reaches Colwall station, where The Coca-Cola Company plant (now demolished) next to the station used to bottle Malvern Water, a local mineral water. Next to the bridge carrying the B4218 road over the railway is an unusual five-sided cottage. When the railway was built one corner had to be demolished and replaced by a plain wall. After passing through another tunnel, Ledbury station is passed and Hereford station ends the journey on the line.

== Services ==
As of 11 December 2011, the previous off peak weekday service continues: roughly an hourly service between London and Worcester. These services are extensions of the half-hourly Oxford fast trains. Some of the former gaps have been partly filled by three additional trains as far as Moreton-in-Marsh (running through from/to London Paddington).

During peak hours, both Oxford fast trains are extended to Worcester, giving a half-hourly service. Overall, most trains continue to/from Great Malvern and four trains a day continue to and from Hereford.

There is also an additional commuter service to and from Oxford in the morning and evening, which additionally calls at the halts (their "Parliamentary" service, preventing their closure).

The historic problem of some trains having to wait at passing loops, extending journey times, has been eliminated by the redoubling, although some still have to wait at Charlbury or Evesham.

Due to short platforms, passengers alighting at stations except Shrub Hill, Worcestershire Parkway, Oxford and Hereford should listen to onboard announcements telling them from which coaches they should alight. Normally this is from the 2–5 coaches at the country end of the train (further from the ticket barrier at London Paddington).

In 2007 some trains in the morning rush hour started at Abergavenny but this was discontinued from December 2008.

== Usage ==
The busiest stations on this line are the city stations at Oxford, Worcester and Hereford, followed by Great Malvern. The busiest station served exclusively by Great Western Railway's Cotswold Line services is Hanborough followed by Moreton-in-Marsh.

Station usage
Station name	2002–03	2004–05	2005–06	2006–07	2007–08	2008–09	2009–10	2010–11	2011–12	2012–13	2013–14	2014–15	2015–16	2016–17	2017–18	2018–19	2019–20	2020–21	2021–22	2022–23	2023–24	2024–25
Oxford	3,648,550	3,956,477	4,076,814	4,540,878	4,712,647	5,080,934	5,427,286	5,797,984	6,226,478	6,309,582	6,505,100	6,624,954	6,564,678	6,631,498	7,984,162	8,270,486	8,702,368	1,574,610	5,013,078	6,581,606	6,786,626	8,145,214
Hanborough	69,997	75,976	70,562	76,580	83,976	105,290	104,050	119,210	137,454	172,684	201,284	243,568	271,496	238,580	231,986	224,290	275,348	47,254	178,368	262,498	286,402	376,462
Combe (Oxfordshire)	1,548	2,037	2,591	2,612	2,042	2,120	1,836	2,546	2,838	2,112	1,684	1,248	1,460	2,008	1,994	2,722	2,762	340	1,238	1,398	1,554	1,326
Finstock	1,799	1,055	1,297	1,157	1,095	1,022	1,458	1,984	1,982	1,970	1,920	1,804	1,770	1,836	1,756	1,714	1,542	102	364	706	1,112	1,136
Charlbury	229,000	236,749	232,040	249,781	239,426	238,918	231,582	244,586	253,202	271,738	287,778	305,284	327,518	294,758	292,934	285,784	314,296	55,812	199,856	257,350	275,526	343,240
Ascott-under-Wychwood	2,050	2,534	2,931	1,769	2,499	2,860	2,264	1,658	2,702	2,484	2,856	4,026	4,532	4,644	3,312	2,638	3,036	638	1,162	1,628	1,392	1,282
Shipton	5,057	6,231	5,513	5,389	3,914	3,032	2,890	3,614	4,680	5,028	5,050	4,884	5,660	6,568	4,572	4,524	5,136	592	2,250	2,354	3,692	3,904
Kingham	121,318	124,462	126,995	131,183	141,310	147,554	137,944	150,890	156,668	169,496	172,006	180,536	184,218	184,260	183,514	181,790	191,518	39,014	162,784	206,270	195,162	251,844
Moreton-in-Marsh	176,389	180,458	178,004	189,230	176,502	185,284	178,040	195,878	203,082	209,238	217,032	237,198	252,950	260,106	268,866	273,018	292,544	50,588	200,094	269,072	295,574	375,804
Honeybourne	18,691	22,077	27,752	34,281	33,127	37,350	35,052	41,446	41,834	47,788	51,400	56,178	57,978	59,496	61,858	66,612	71,830	16,280	64,078	85,768	92,244	113,180
Evesham	240,174	269,474	239,257	236,611	214,364	207,998	203,578	221,594	220,072	258,190	245,612	247,724	255,476	257,544	246,898	234,006	245,990	66,164	203,748	245,142	258,370	287,118
Pershore	50,949	53,154	62,522	61,739	61,971	62,472	58,744	67,230	73,000	89,546	87,956	95,310	100,690	103,956	102,038	94,844	102,550	37,112	88,116	103,874	101,244	115,878
Worcestershire Parkway	—N/a	—N/a	—N/a	—N/a	—N/a	—N/a	—N/a	—N/a	—N/a	—N/a	—N/a	—N/a	—N/a	—N/a	—N/a	—N/a	25,478	32,350	314,894	334,658	339,060	456,184
Worcester Shrub Hill	1,225,757	1,355,790	202,708	592,756	625,971	761,666	856,196	747,595	780,168	891,844	968,834	595,402	618,467	818,070	845,794	806,636	660,638	161,288	409,540	477,310	526,970	577,194
Worcester Foregate Street	379,734	319,996	1,582,620	1,273,385	1,252,182	1,469,283	1,487,256	1,625,011	1,791,810	1,859,984	1,833,902	2,207,508	2,293,021	2,100,826	2,172,026	2,071,468	2,190,982	534,904	1,358,222	1,582,976	1,747,674	1,914,248
Malvern Link	165,820	179,091	201,091	216,790	227,141	235,748	249,898	261,792	267,522	278,592	296,934	313,526	344,232	354,414	348,714	355,256	360,234	93,628	253,760	302,128	317,688	320,672
Great Malvern	394,411	373,914	392,143	405,371	384,906	447,172	464,296	484,668	502,468	514,778	526,374	543,198	557,012	559,494	562,634	531,124	537,454	126,294	324,946	367,552	400,852	428,770
Colwall	43,788	40,574	44,596	51,392	56,384	56,528	63,062	61,356	66,110	63,374	65,210	63,560	66,642	60,870	64,162	62,146	67,664	19,102	44,866	52,402	56,824	63,456
Ledbury	133,968	130,403	135,033	147,496	162,588	180,136	184,340	189,308	193,952	185,588	195,348	203,612	214,632	210,098	216,606	218,822	218,858	67,320	162,662	187,960	185,386	194,606
Hereford	602,219	732,320	800,448	854,475	899,199	974,844	974,668	1,017,114	1,081,990	1,085,918	1,103,764	1,192,912	1,226,444	1,228,284	1,240,212	1,215,784	1,194,120	500,182	1,002,596	1,117,190	1,161,190	1,229,916
The annual passenger usage is based on sales of tickets in stated financial years from Office of Rail and Road estimates of station usage. The statistics are for passengers arriving and departing from each station and cover twelve-month periods that start in April. Methodology may vary year on year. Usage since the period 2019–20 have been affected by the COVID-19 pandemic, especially the period 2020–23.

== Poetry ==
The line features in two notable poems: "Adlestrop" by Edward Thomas and "Pershore Station, or A Liverish Journey First Class" by John Betjeman.

== Sources and further reading ==
- Atterbury, Paul (1989). See Britain by Train. AA Publishing. pp. not cited. ISBN 0-86145-760-9.
- Connolly, W. Philip (1976). British Railways Pre-Grouping Atlas and Gazetteer. Shepperton: Ian Allan Publishing. ISBN 0-7110-0320-3.
- Dewick, Tony (2002). Complete Atlas of Railway Station Names. Hersham: Ian Allan Publishing. ISBN 0-7110-2798-6.
- New Adlestrop Railway Atlas.
- Baxter, Ian (17–30 June 1998). "The Cotswold and Malvern Line: a bright future". RAIL. No. 333. EMAP Apex Publications. pp. 26–31. ISSN 0953-4563. OCLC 49953699.
