= West Midland Railway =

Early British railway company

West Midland Railway Act 1860
- Act of Parliament
- Parliament of the United Kingdom
- Long title: An Act for the Amalgamation of the Newport, Abergavenny, and Hereford and the Worcester and Hereford Railway Companies with the Oxford, Worcester, and Wolverhampton Railway Company, under the Name of "The West Midland Railway Company."
- Citation: 23 & 24 Vict. c. lxxxi

Dates
- Royal assent: 14 June 1860

The West Midland Railway was an early British railway company. It was formed on 1 July 1860 by the West Midland Railway Act 1860 (23 & 24 Vict. c. lxxxi) which merged several older railway companies. It was amalgamated with the Great Western Railway on 1 August 1863. It was the successor to the Oxford, Worcester and Wolverhampton Railway (OWWR).

== History ==
=== Constituents ===
West Midland Railway (Additional Works) Act 1862
- Act of Parliament
- Parliament of the United Kingdom
- Long title: An Act to authorize the West Midland Railway Company to construct additional Works, and to raise further Sums of Money; to provide Facilities for the Passage of their Traffic to Newport in the County of Monmouth; to regulate their Powers of raising Money in respect of certain other Undertakings; and for other Purposes.
- Citation: 25 & 26 Vict. c. clxviii

Dates
- Royal assent: 17 July 1862

Text of statute as originally enacted

West Midland Railway Act 1863
- Act of Parliament
- Parliament of the United Kingdom
- Long title: An Act to grant further Powers to the West Midland Railway Company, and to enable them to make a Branch Railway in the County of Glamorgan; and for other Purposes.
- Citation: 26 & 27 Vict. c. cxxxvi

Dates
- Royal assent: 13 July 1863

The original constituent companies were the Newport, Abergavenny and Hereford Railway (incorporated 1846 and opened 1854), the Worcester and Hereford Railway (incorporated 1853 and opened 1859), and the Oxford, Worcester and Wolverhampton Railway (incorporated 1845 and opened 1850); which had already absorbed the Stratford and Moreton Tramway (incorporated 1821 and opened 1826).

On 1 July 1861, the WMR leased the Coleford, Monmouth, Usk and Pontypool Railway (incorporated 1853 and opened 1857). In 1862, it also leased the Leominster and Kington Railway (opened 1857) and the Severn Valley Railway (from opening).

=== Amalgamation with the GWR ===
Great Western Railway (West Midland Amalgamation) Act 1863
- Act of Parliament
- Parliament of the United Kingdom
- Long title: An Act for the Amalgamation of the West Midland Railway Company with the Great Western Railway Company; and for other Purposes.
- Citation: 26 & 27 Vict. c. cxiii

Dates
- Royal assent: 13 July 1863

Text of statute as originally enacted

The West Midland Railway was dissolved by the Great Western Railway (West Midland Amalgamation) Act 1863 (26 & 27 Vict. c. cxiii) on 1 August 1863, with its powers and obligations being vested in the Great Western Railway. The West Midland Railway Company itself continued in existence until complete amalgamation was brought about by the Great Western Railway Act 1872 (35 & 36 Vict. c. cxxix).

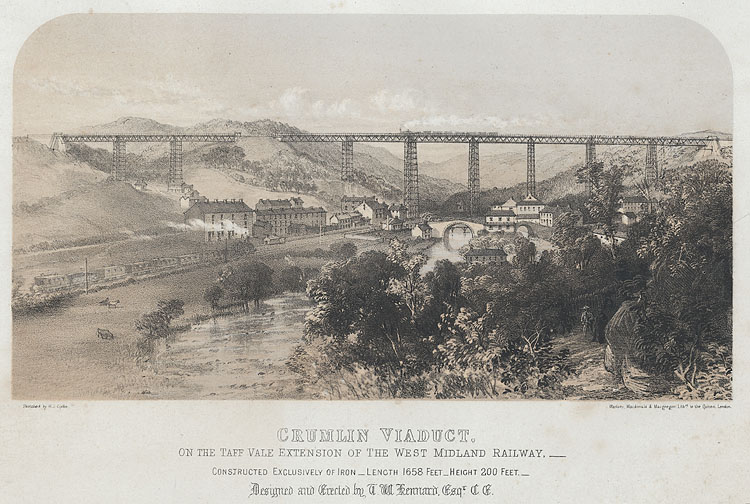
Taff Vale Extension of the West Midland Railway and Crumlin Viaduct.

== See also ==
- List of early British railway companies
