= Worcester and Hereford Railway =

Railway line in England

The Worcester and Hereford Railway started the construction of a standard gauge railway between the two cities in 1858. It had needed the financial assistance of larger concerns, chiefly the Oxford, Worcester and Wolverhampton Railway, and the Newport, Abergavenny and Hereford Railway. It opened its line progressively from 1859 to 1861, delayed by exceptionally difficult tunnelling at Colwall and Ledbury. The company was purchased by the West Midland Railway in 1860, and that company amalgamated with the Great Western Railway in 1863.

The line was double track as far as Malvern at first, but was later doubled throughout except for the two tunnels. The line was conceived chiefly as a through railway for passenger and goods trains; the local traffic remained thin.

The line remained a secondary main line, and is in operation today.

== Conception ==
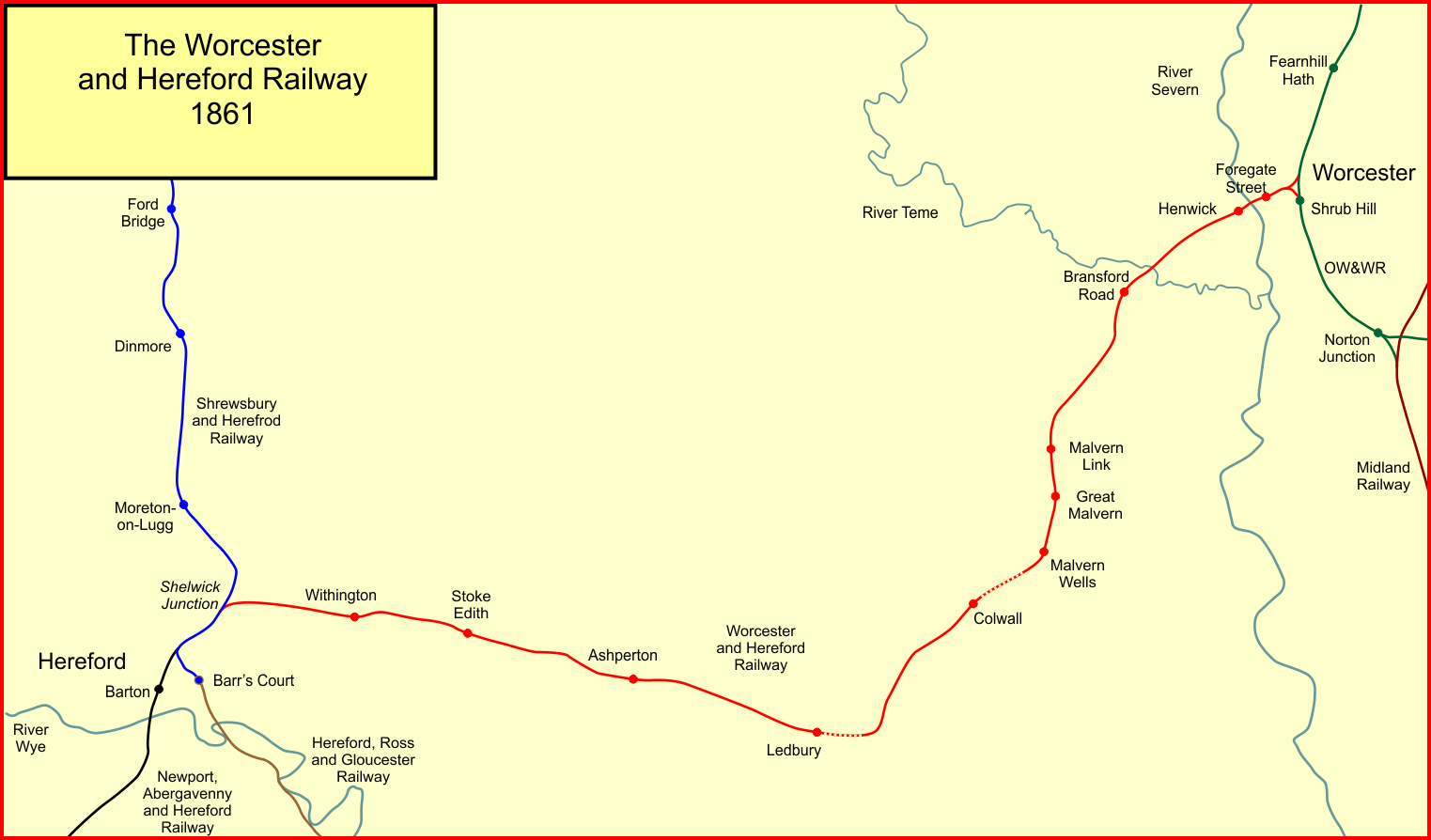
The Worcester and Hereford Railway

The London and North Western Railway decided to promote a narrow (standard) gauge Worcester and Hereford Railway in the 1852 session of Parliament. It had allies in the Midland Railway and also the Newport, Abergavenny and Hereford Railway, and hoped to reach the rich mineral deposits of South Wales by running over those railways. Its bill was rejected in the Lords in 1852, but it returned with a revised route in 1853. The broad gauge interest promoted a different line joining the two cities, intending to keep the LNWR and its friends out of South Wales.

Worcester and Hereford Railway Act 1853
- Act of Parliament
- Parliament of the United Kingdom
- Long title: An Act to enable the Worcester and Hereford Railway Company to make a Branch Railway to the Severn at Worcester, and to enlarge their Station at Hereford; and for other Purposes.
- Citation: 16 & 17 Vict. c. clxxxiv

Dates
- Royal assent: 21 July 1859

The narrow gauge line was successful, and Worcester and Hereford Railway Act 1853 (16 & 17 Vict. c. clxxxiv) was passed on 15 August 1853; (Note: Carter says 7 August 1853.) authorised capital was £750,000. The broad gauge line was thrown out; but at the time Parliament was suspicious of large groupings of railways in the hands of one dominant company, and it struck out all the clauses in the bill giving powers of subscribing for shares, or for working arrangements, by the LNWR or the Midland Railway.

The Worcester and Hereford Railway was therefore authorised, but left on its own, and it found itself unable to raise capital to build its line. A return to Parliament in the 1855 in an attempt to have the assistance clauses reinstated was also rejected. This left the W&HR in a state of stagnation.

After a year or more the Oxford, Worcester and Wolverhampton Railway took up the cause of the W&HR, encouraged by directors of the NA&HR who had become also members of the Worcester and Hereford Railway board, and later the Midland Railway joined in the group of potential suppliers of funds. An application for the necessary powers was made in the 1858 session, and by now Parliament had softened its position, and the Oxford, Worcester and Wolverhampton Railway Act 1858 (21 & 22 Vict. c. cxxiii) was passed.

Construction could now be started and a double line was in the process of being constructed from Worcester to Malvern, and a single line from there to Shelwick Junction, where the line would join the Shrewsbury and Hereford Railway a few miles north of Hereford. At Worcester there was to be a triangular junction. A triangular junction had been authorised at Shelwick also, but this was never made.

== Opening ==
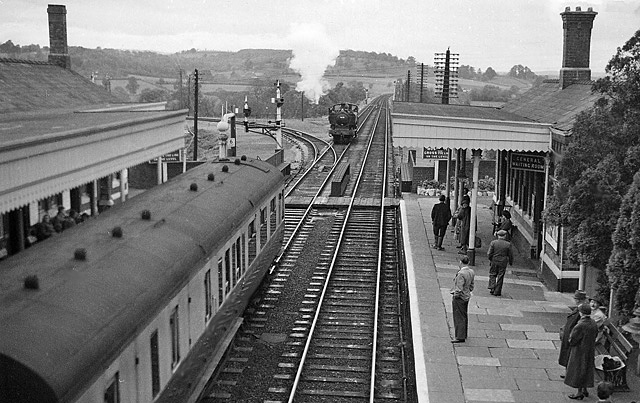
Ledbury station

The line was opened in stages. The first section was from Henwick (at Worcester but on the west side of the River Severn) to Malvern Link was opened on 25 July 1859. The line was worked by the Oxford, Worcester and Wolverhampton Railway company, although the line was not as yet physically connected to it.

The bridge over the River Severn at Worcester remained to be completed. When it was presented to the Board of Trade inspecting officer, he declined to sanction its use for passenger trains as the slender arches had too great a deflection. The bridge spans were stiffened and the line between Tunnel Junction, at the north apex of the triangular junction with the OW&WR at Worcester, and Henwick opened to traffic on 17 May 1860; trains reversed at Tunnel Junction to get access to and from Shrub Hill station. On 24 May the other end of the line was extended from Malvern Link to Malvern Wells. The west-to-south part of the Worcester triangle was opened to traffic on 25 July 1860.

There were two tunnels, between Malvern and Colwall (1567 yards) and at Ledbury (1323 yards); the Malvern tunnel was particularly difficult due to the rock being exceptionally hard.

It was decided not to blast the rock in the Malvern tunnel, as the engineer was bringing down from London, a novel contrivance in a tunnelling machine of extraordinary power, driven by steam, which had been intended for use in the siege operations before Sebastopol, now rendered unnecessary.

== The West Midland Railway ==
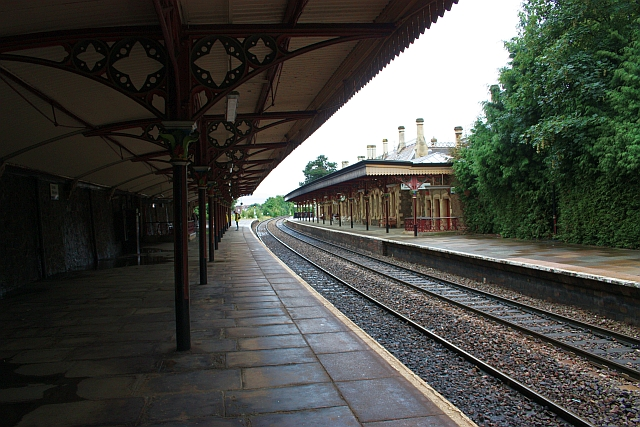
Great Malvern station

Friendly relations between the OW&WR and the NA&HR ripened into a proposed amalgamation, which would also purchase the Worcester and Hereford Company. A bill for the purpose was introduced into the 1860 session of Parliament and eventually became enacted as the West Midland Railway Act 1860 (23 & 24 Vict. c. lxxxi) on 16 June 1860. The combined company was to be called the West Midland Railway. Worcester and Hereford shareholders were guaranteed 4% from the opening of their line, rising to 5% in the third year. The amalgamation took effect, and the West Midland Railway was created, on 1 July 1860. At the same time the Worcester and Hereford Railway ceased to exist, its undertaking having been absorbed by the new company.

== West Midland Railway amalgamated with the GWR ==
Relations between the Great Western Railway and the West Midland Railway were not especially harmonious, and it came as a shock to many when in 1861 it was announced that they had settled their differences and were to be amalgamated. An amalgamation act of Parliament would be needed but in the meantime the companies would act as far as legally possible as a single system. The Great Western Railway (West Midland Amalgamation) Act 1863 (26 & 27 Vict. c. cxiii) came into effect on 1 August 1863.

== Completion of the Worcester and Hereford Railway ==
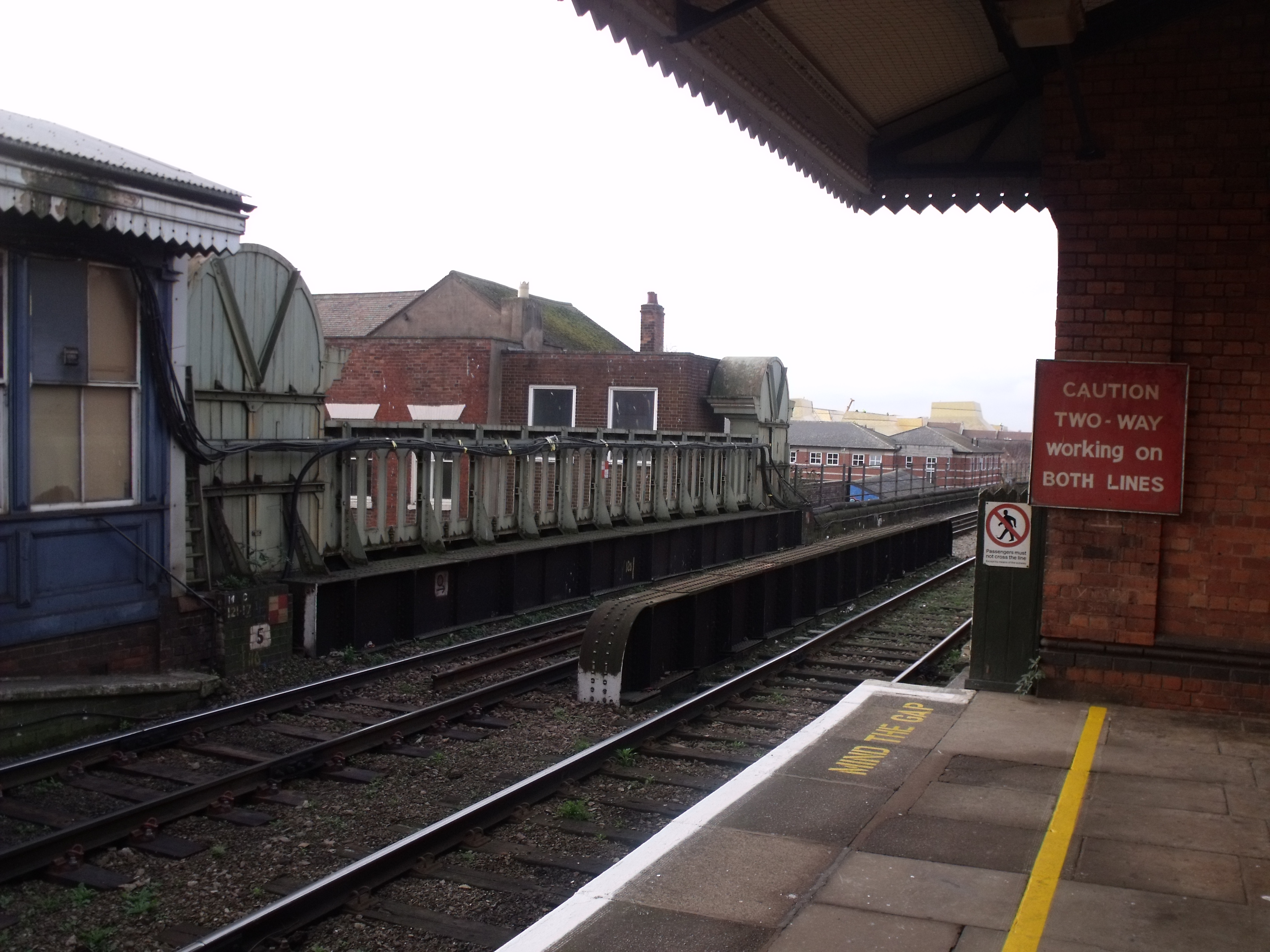
Worcester Foregate Street station

Finishing the Malvern Tunnel was the key to opening the rest of the Worcester and Hereford line. The opening took place on 15 September 1861. It had the effect of physically connecting the two parts of the West Midland Railway: the former OW&WR and the former NA&HR. It also provided a new through narrow (standard) gauge route between London and South Wales; this was important as most of the collieries in South Wales were on narrow gauge lines there, and transhipment of coal had been a major deterrent in conveying coal to London and Southampton over the GWR and its partners. At the same time the LNWR gained access over the line to South Wales.

== Double track ==
The line was built with single track from Malvern Wells to Shelwick Junction. Double track was provided in that section, except in the two long tunnels, by 1885.

== Midland Railway ==
John Speller writes:

The Midland Railway had running powers over the Worcester & Hereford line via the Stoke Works Branch and the Oxford, Worcester & Wolverhampton line from Droitwich Spa to Worcester, making the route part of the Midland Railway's route line from Birmingham to Swansea. At Malvern Wells Sidings, between Great Malvern and Malvern Wells, the Midland Railway had a turntable and water tank for servicing their line to Ashchurch. After 1923 the LMS used the LNWR route to Swansea, and the Midland Railway's running powers were not much exercised.

== Colwall tunnel ==
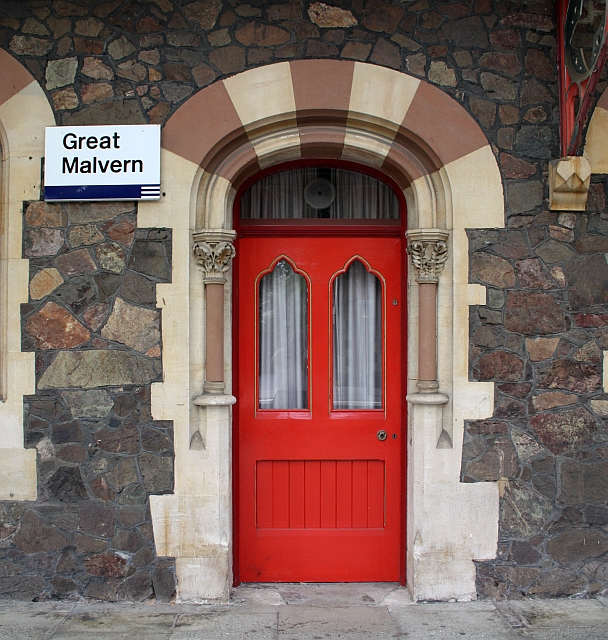
Doorway at Great Malvern station

Colwall Tunnel, west of Malvern, was geologically difficult, and maintenance problems with it resulted in its being replaced in August 1926 by a new single line tunnel alongside on a slightly easier gradient of 1 in 90 (the old tunnel being 1 in 80).

== Rainbow Hill Junction and Henwick ==
Rainbow Hill Junction was at the western apex of the Worcester triangle. In November 1973 the signal box and junction trackwork were abolished, and the line to Henwick station worked as two single lines, combining into a double line west of Henwick.

== Singling ==
In October 1967 the double-track section between the two tunnels was singled, and Colwall and Ledbury North End signal boxes closed, leaving an uninterrupted single line section between Malvern Wells and Ledbury.

The line between Ledbury and Shelwick Junction was then singled in 1984, with Stoke Edith and Shelwick Junction signal boxes closed and control of the junction at Shelwick transferred to Hereford. A passing loop through Ledbury station remains.

== Passenger train services ==
The 1895 Bradshaw shows six daily stopping trains, supplemented by three running from Worcester to Gloucester via Ledbury. There were three daily North and West Expresses, generally with through coaches from Manchester, Liverpool and Birkenhead to Bristol and Cardiff.

By 1922 the stopping train service was similar, although more of the stopping trains terminated at Malvern. There were several semi-fast services, and Birmingham was the dominant focus, with two London to Hereford trains.

In 1938 the local service was broadly similar, but with several additional journeys from Worcester to Malvern, shown as third class only, suggesting they were auto-trains.

In 1960 there were substantially fewer stopping trains although auto-trains to Colwall were still evident. There were several semi-fast Birmingham to Cardiff trains, and the London to Hereford services had increased considerably, with many fewer Birmingham to Hereford trains on the route. The through Cardiff trains were withdrawn in 1969 when BR standardised its Birmingham-Cardiff services to use the shorter route via Gloucester.

By the late 1970s, there were relatively few through Birmingham trains, with the majority of those calling at most stations north of Stourbridge and very few using the direct Droitwich loop line between Worcester Foregate Street and Tunnel Junction, all of which made most end-to-end journey times very uncompetitive. Apart from these and the remaining through London trains, most services on the line ran just between Worcester Shrub Hill and Hereford, calling at all stations.

Despite the singling of the Cotswold Line in 1971, three through peak-hour London-Hereford trains continued to run in each direction until almost the end of the decade, when BR had to limit the number of loco-hauled Cotswold Line trains, after which only the two through peak trains each way survived. But in the 1980s a third, named the "Cotswold and Malvern Express" was added to/from Great Malvern, giving the line its first regular HST working.

Until 1982, through Birmingham trains had mostly used the Birmingham to Worcester via Kidderminster line, with typically just one peak hour train to/from Great Malvern using the more direct Birmingham to Worcester via Bromsgrove Line. Then an hourly Birmingham-Hereford service was introduced via the latter. In the mid 1980s this was also diverted via Kidderminster to address congestion caused by Bromsgrove then only having a single platform, but after a second one was opened in 1990 these trains reverted to the Bromsgrove route and have since become very successful.

== The present day ==
The line continues in use as a secondary main line, with London to Hereford trains as well as local trains using Birmingham as their focus. Freight traffic is light.

== Gradients ==
The summit of the line is at Colwall; from the north-east it is approached by an eight-mile climb of 1 in 120 to 1 in 80 from Malvern; from the west there is a five-mile climb at 1 in 80 leading to it. The line from Ledbury to Shelwick Junction is undulating.

== Location list ==
- Worcester Shrub Hill; opened 5 October 1850; still open;
- Tunnel Junction and Shrub Hill Junction; triangular junctions on OW&WR main line;
- Rainbow Hill Junction;
- Worcester Foregate Street; opened 17 May 1860; still open;
- Henwick; opened 25 July 1859; closed 5 April 1965;
- Boughton Halt; opened 31 March 1924; closed 5 April 1965;
- Rushwick Halt; opened 31 March 1924; closed 5 April 1965;
- Leominster Junction; divergence of Bromyard branch 1874 - 1964;
- Bransford Road; opened 1 September 1860; closed 5 April 1965;
- Newland Halt; opened 18 March 1929; closed 5 April 1965;
- Malvern Link; opened 25 July 1859; still open;
- Great Malvern; opened 25 May 1860; still open;
- Malvern & Tewkesbury Junction; divergence of Tewkesbury line 1862 - 1952;
- Malvern Wells; opened 25 May 1860; closed 19 January 1861; reopened 1 February 1864; closed 5 April 1965;
- Colwall; opened 13 September 1861; still open;
- Ledbury; opened 13 September 1861; still open; divergence of Dymock line 1885 - 1959;
- Ashperton; opened 13 September 1861; closed 5 April 1965;
- Stoke Edith; opened 13 September 1861; closed 5 April 1965;
- Withington; opened 13 September 1861; closed 2 January 1961;
- Shelwick Junction; convergence with Shrewsbury and Hereford Railway.
