= Drakelow, Worcestershire =

Hamlet in Worcestershire, England

Coordinates: 52.4151732°N 2.2812652°W

Drakelow
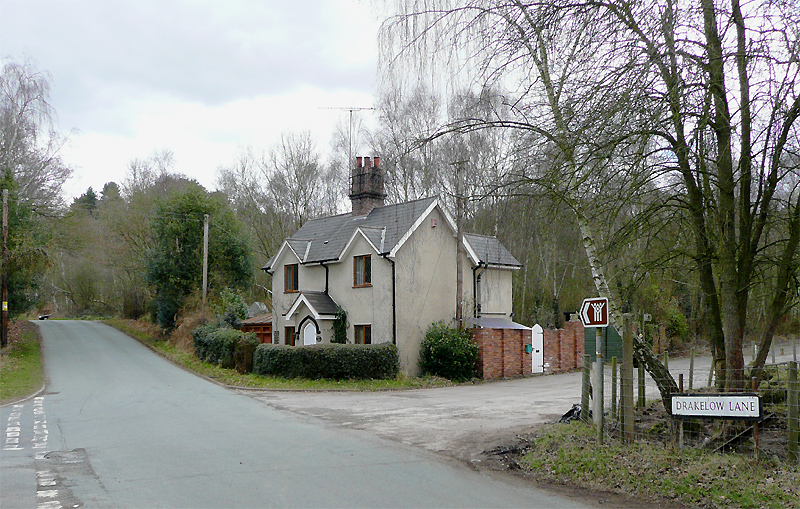
- Baxter Cottage, Drakelow

- Location within Worcestershire
- OS grid reference: SO819802
  - London: 111 miles (179 km)
- Civil parish: Wolverley & Cookley
- District: Wyre Forest
- Shire county: Worcestershire
- Region: West Midlands
- Country: England
- Sovereign state: United Kingdom
- Post town: KIDDERMINSTER
- Postcode district: DY11
- Dialling code: 01562
- Police: West Mercia
- Fire: Hereford and Worcester
- Ambulance: West Midlands
- UK Parliament: Wyre Forest

Drakelow is a hamlet in Worcestershire, England. It is one of the ancient townships of the manor of Wolverley, whose extent was similar to that of the modern civil parish of Wolverley & Cookley. It is located approximately 1 mile (1.6 km) northwest of Wolverley and the same distance southwest of Blakeshall.

== Geography and history ==
During the Iron Age, Drakelow was the location of a small multivallate hillfort which stood on a promontory known as Drakelow Hill. The name 'Drakelow', meaning 'Dragon's Mound', is of Anglo-Saxon origin, the locality having been well settled by that time. The name appeared in a document in 1240 as 'Brakelowe', but the present spelling was used in a Will in 1582.

In the nineteenth century William Hancocks, owner of the Blakeshall Estate, built a 'Swiss' style village on the sandstone hills above Drakelow. During the Second World War the Drakelow Tunnels shadow factory was built on the old village site, and subsequently developed during the Cold War to be a fall-back government centre. The main entrance to the Tunnels during wartime was on the land behind Baxter Cottage, seen in the photograph.

The sandstone hills at Drakelow had a number of rock houses similar to those on nearby Kinver Edge. The remains of some of these rock houses may be seen from the path leading east from Baxter Cottage. The Baxter Monument, a stone obelisk, is also located on a sandstone hill north of Drakelow.
