= Caunsall =

Village in Worcestershire, England

Coordinates: 52.426°N 2.222°W

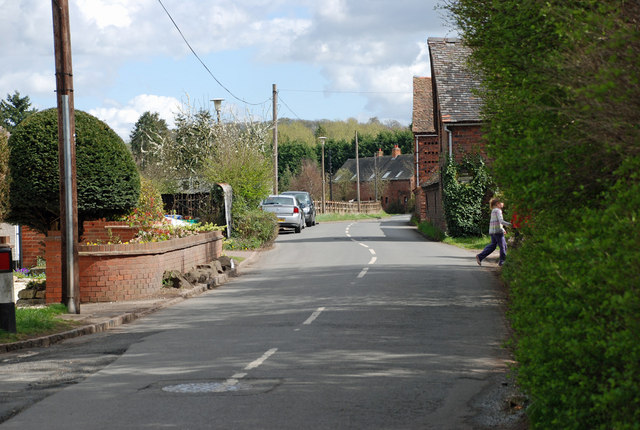

- Location within Worcestershire
- OS grid reference: SO853809
- District: Wyre Forest
- Shire county: Worcestershire
- Region: West Midlands
- Country: England
- Sovereign state: United Kingdom
- Post town: KIDDERMINSTER
- Postcode district: DY11
- Police: West Mercia
- Fire: Hereford and Worcester
- Ambulance: West Midlands
- UK Parliament: Wyre Forest

Caunsall is a village in Worcestershire, England a few miles to the north of Kidderminster and close to the villages of Kinver, Cookley and Wolverley. It lies on the River Stour, and the Staffordshire and Worcestershire Canal. It is located within the civil parish of Wolverley and Cookley, which had a population of 4,960 in 2021.
