= River Stour, Worcestershire =

River in the West Midlands, England

Coordinates: 52.335169°N 2.27608°W

River Stour
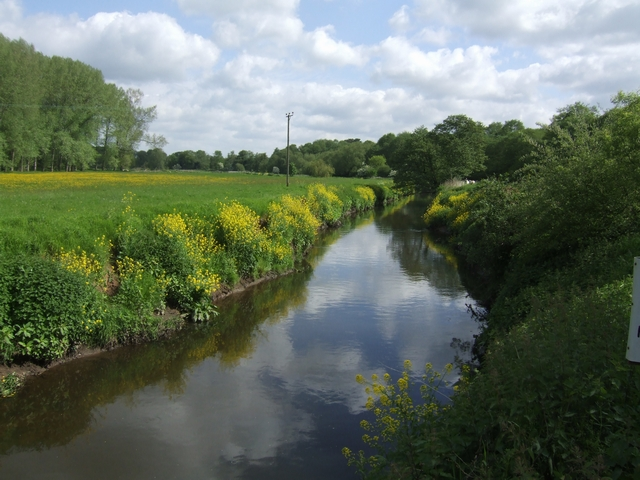
- River Stour near Caunsall

Location
- Country: England
- Counties: West Midlands, Worcestershire, Staffordshire
- Settlements: Halesowen, Stourbridge, Kinver, Caunsall, Cookley, Wolverley, Kidderminster, Stourport-on-Severn

Physical characteristics
- Source
  - location: Clent Hills, Worcestershire
- Mouth: River Severn
  - location: Stourport-on-Severn
- Length: 40 km (25 mi)

The Stour (/ˈstaʊər/, rhymes with "flour") is a river flowing through the counties of Worcestershire, the West Midlands and Staffordshire in the West Midlands region of England. The Stour is a major tributary of the River Severn, and is about 25 miles (40 km) in length. It has played a considerable part in the economic history of the region.

== Etymology and usage ==
The river-name Stour, common in England, does not occur at all in Wales; Crawford noted two tributaries of the Po River near Turin, spelled Sture. In Germany the Stoer (Stör) flows into the River Elbe. The name Stour is pronounced differently in different cases. The Kentish Stour rhymes with tour; the Oxfordshire Stour is sometimes rhymes with the mower, sometimes with hour. The Worcestershire, Dorset and Suffolk Stour's always rhyme with hour.

The origin of the name(s) remains in dispute. The Middle English word stour has two distinct meanings and derivations, still current enough to appear in most substantial dictionaries. As an adjective, with Germanic roots, it signifies "large, powerful". As a noun, from medieval French roots, it signifies "tumult, commotion; confusion" or an "armed battle or conflict". The primary definition in the Concise Oxford Dictionary is "blowing or deposit of dust", a northern English and Scottish usage of uncertain derivation. Recently it has been suggested by Richard Coates that an Old European river-name was taken for an Old English adjective and that stour came to represent one pole of a structural opposition, with blyth at the opposite pole, allowing Anglo-Saxons to classify rivers on a continuum of fierceness.

However, Margaret Gelling, a specialist in Midland toponyms, emphasises the importance of situating place-names in the landscape. It is hard to see the river in dramatic terms. Undoubtedly it has a history of flooding and can rise quickly after rain, but it is unlikely that anyone familiar with the Severn, into which it flows, could see the Stour as embodying raw power or turbulence. The Victorian etymologist Isaac Taylor, now long discredited on many counts, proposed a very simple solution: that Stour derives from dŵr, the Welsh word for water. (Celtic origins are quite likely in the West Midlands and Worcestershire.) It is possible that the various Stours do not share a common origin or significant characteristics, requiring each to be considered on their terms. Certainly there is currently no universally-accepted explanation.

== Course ==
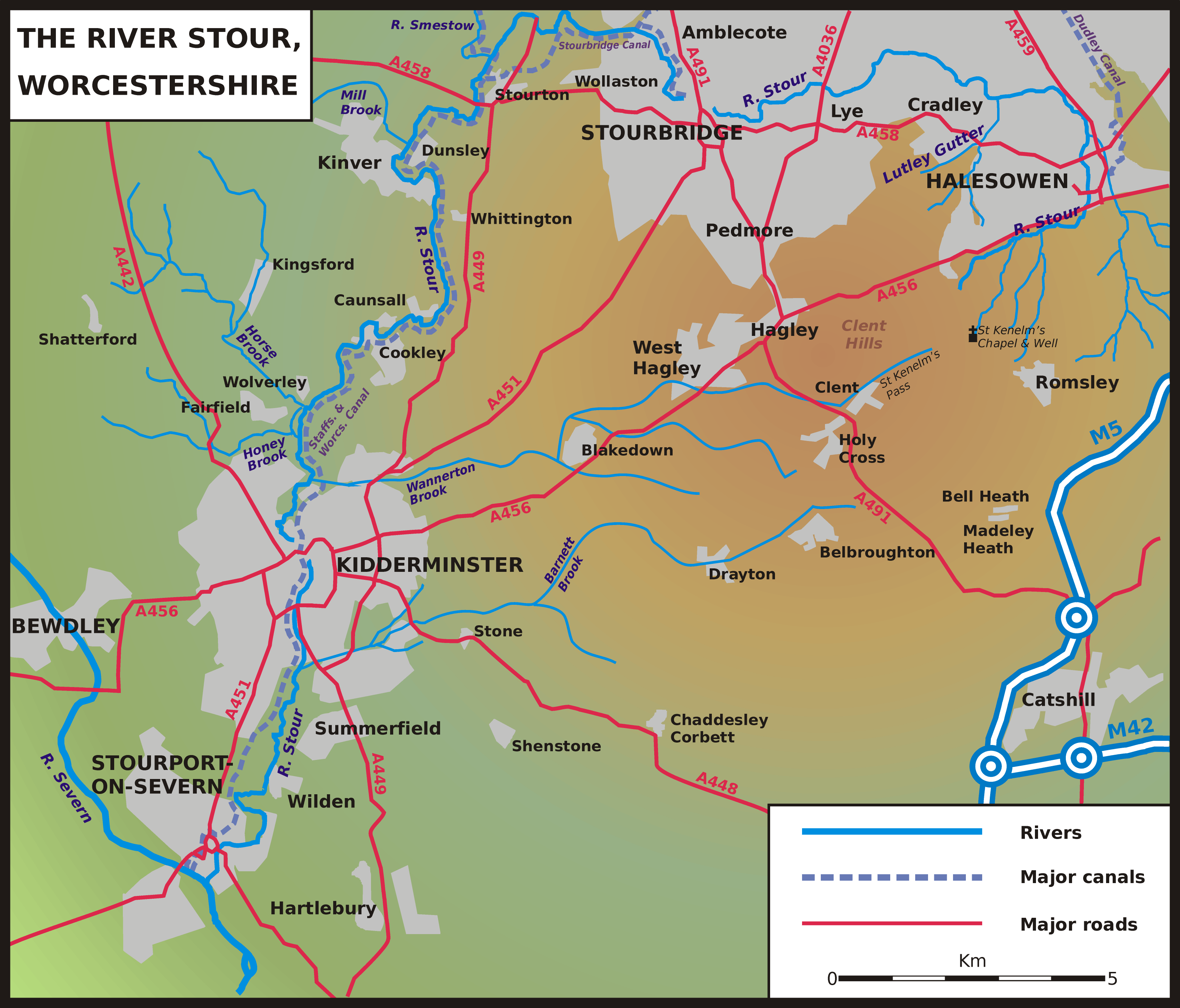
Sketch map of the course of the River Stour through Worcestershire, the West Midlands and Staffordshire

The river rises in the north of Worcestershire in the Clent Hills, near St Kenelm's Church in Romsley. It collects water from many small tributary streams from the Clent Hills as it descends, following a generally north-easterly course, before veering north into the West Midlands at Halesowen.

The river continues to gather strength from Clent streams as it flows through Halesowen, before turning westwards through the southern part of the Black Country, staying within the Metropolitan Borough of Dudley. It flows through Cradley and Lye and then between Stourbridge, to which it gives its name, and Amblecote, historically an important centre of the glass industry. Here it passes half-concealed through industrial estates that have replaced traditional heavy industry, shadowed for a few kilometres by the Stourbridge Canal. It leaves the conurbation via the suburb of Wollaston, descending fairly rapidly from the West Midlands plateau to Prestwood.

The Stour enters Staffordshire at Prestwood and veers southwards, henceforward shadowed by the Staffordshire and Worcestershire Canal, which crosses over it on a sandstone aqueduct just before its confluence with the Smestow Brook, an important tributary that drains the area north to Wolverhampton. The Stour flows south to Stourton and then loops along the eastern edge of the large village of Kinver, whence it flows back into Worcestershire.

Passing through the villages of Caunsall, Cookley and Wolverley, it is joined by the Horse Brook, which drains an area extending northward into Shropshire, and the Honey Brook. Further south, the Wannerton Brook brings in water from the Blakedown area, on the western fringe of the Clent Hills. The Stour then bisects Kidderminster from north to south. Here it is hidden from sight for a short distance as it passes beneath the canal, to emerge on its eastern side. At the southern edge of Kidderminster the Stour is joined by the Barnett Brook, a major tributary which begins in the Clent Hills, and which, together with the Hoo Brook, creates a large complex of pools to the east. Passing through the formerly navigable section around Wilden, it joins the River Severn at Stourport, in a small, old industrial area to the east of the canal port.

== Geology ==
The Stour rises on the north-eastern edge of the Clent Hills, an outcrop of New red sandstone that traps it on the West Midland plateau. Its course is mainly over similar sandstone, together with some gravels, as it finds its way off the plateau by a fairly circuitous route, to the Severn valley. In this it is similar to the Tame and its own tributary, the Smestow: all are forced to wander far along generally shallow gradients as they find their way from the plateau, which is essentially a shallow dish in shape - a low tableland with raised edges. It carries mainly sandy sediments, as can be seen after rainfall.

== Wildlife ==
The Stour was once a trout stream, but became severely polluted with chemicals that were released into it by industries along its banks, particularly acid from the holloware industry of Lye. In the final decades of the 20th century, this pollution ceased, and the river was cleaned up. Nowadays, wildlife is making a comeback in the Stour with kingfishers and grey heron present, as well as recent reports of salmon and trout beginning to recolonise as far as Stourbridge.

== History ==
For a short section west of Stourbridge, the Stour marks the boundary, between the historic counties of Staffordshire and Worcestershire. It also historically formed part of the boundary of an exclave of Shropshire, which contained Halesowen, until the town was transferred to Worcestershire in the 19th century, along with nearby Oldbury.

=== Industry ===
Mills were a crucial part of the medieval economy and the Stour was well able to power them. At Cradley, at the confluence of the upper Stour and the Lutley Gutter (also known as the Pudding Brook), in what was to become the Black Country, the earliest mentions of mills date back to the 12th century. Two corn mills are mentioned in Kinver in the Domesday Book.

From the Middle Ages, the lower Stour was important in this early industrial development, as its fulling mills thickened cloth made in Worcester, Kidderminster, and Kinver. From the 17th century there was a proliferation of iron forges fined pig iron and slitting mills, which cut bars of iron into rods for the production of nails in the Black Country. Blade mills (on tributaries), sharpened the blades of scythes and other tools from the 15th century. Richard Foley established one of the earliest slitting mills at the Hyde, Kinver in 1627.

Many of the mills on the Stour were formerly concerned with the iron industry. Whittington, near Kinver, had a forge and then a slitting mill, and finally a nail mill. Mills were converted from one use to another, as demand fluctuated: fulling mills of the 16th century, often became forges or slitting mills in the 17th. The 17th century iron industry along the Stour and its tributaries is connected with the name of Dud Dudley (an illegitimate son of Edward Sutton, 5th Baron Dudley) who carried out early experiments, using coal products to substitute for charcoal in iron production and wrote a book, Metallum Martis. The Dudley family had works at Cradley. The Foley family were much more important in the later 17th century and the Knight family in the 18th. Iron production continued well into the 19th century (occasionally, even later), but the valley was overshadowed by the coke-based industry on the Black Country plateau.

=== Navigation ===
Rivers Stour and Salwarpe Navigation Act 1662
- Act of Parliament
- Parliament of England
- Long title: An Act for making navigable the Rivers of Stower and Salwerp, and the Rivulets and Brooks running into the same, in the Counties of Worcester and Stafford.
- Citation: 14 Cha. 2. c. 14 Pr.
- Territorial extent: England and Wales

Dates
- Royal assent: 19 May 1662
- Commencement: 7 January 1662 (Note: Start of session.)

Status: Current legislation

In the 1660s and 1670s, Andrew Yarranton attempted to make the river Stour itself navigable along much of its course. But these efforts were finally abandoned around 1680, when funds were exhausted. It is doubtful whether it would have been a profitable enterprise, had it succeeded. At Wilden a short section of the Stour, of about a mile, was successfully made navigable but because of all the bends it is recorded that it was not easy to navigate. There was a lock at Pratt's Wharf (misnamed Platt's Wharf by the Ordnance Survey) connecting the Staffordshire and Worcestershire Canal with the river. This enabled canal barges to use the River Stour to deliver timber to a steam saw-mill in Wilden. Later it was used to transport coal and iron to the Wilden Works. The wharf was built by Isaac Pratt from Henwick, Worcester in 1835. He is described as a businessman and a merchant. There were two houses at Pratt's Wharf, one occupied by a lock keeper and the other by a clerk. The link was closed c. 1950.

The Staffordshire and Worcestershire Canal, planned by James Brindley, was built between 1770 and 1772. It shadows the Smestow, and then the Stour from Prestwood southward, cutting across its many bends and meanders. From Stourton Junction (near Prestwood), the Stourbridge Canal led to Stourbridge, thus shadowing the upper Stour, while branches led towards collieries near Brierley Hill and linked to the Dudley Canal. These were all built in the late 18th century, effectively creating a canal network parallel to the river network.

=== Later industry ===
Kidderminster, long a centre of cloth manufacture, increasingly specialised in carpet-making from about 1785. The Stour took on a fresh importance as this industry grew, driving the fulling and weaving processes, as well as carrying away the effluent - particularly when dyed cloth was washed in the river. The flow of the Stour became so crucial to the manufacturers of the town that they persistently fought attempts to extract water for industrial and domestic use from the Smestow – potentially of great value to Wolverhampton and the Black Country.

The magnificent Stambermill Viaduct carries what was the former Oxford, Worcester and Wolverhampton Railway line over the Stour between Stourbridge and Lye. It now is only used by goods trains.

== Tributaries ==
The main tributaries of the Stour are, travelling upstream from its confluence with the River Severn:

- The Barnett Brook or Belne Brook, which enters from the left, bringing water from a number of tributary streams. The Barnett Brook originates on the Clent Hills (on the opposite side of the watershed to the Stour's own feeder streams). To the north-west of Belbroughton, two major feeder streams converge at Bell End (one of which is known as Fenn Brook). The stream known locally as Belne Brook then flow into Belbroughton where another feeder stream from the foot of the Clent Hills joins it. It leaves Belbroughton and flows through Drayton, and then to Stone where a tributary from Harvington Hall joins it. From there it flows into Kidderminster where at the Spennels Valley Nature Reserve it is joined by the Hoo Brook, (a stream that supply a complex of lakes and pools towards Stone, to the south-east of Kidderminster).
- Known as Wannerton Brook, at its confluence with the Stour one mile below Wolverley, at Broadwaters to the north of Kidderminster. Its three largest feeder streams converge and feed a series of pools in Blakedown where the stream is known as the Blakedown Brook. Two of the three feeder streams start on the Clent Hills (on the opposite side of the watershed to the Stour's own feeder streams) the first originates in St Kenelm's Pass above High Clent and passes down through West Hagley on to Stakenbridge and Churchill. The second originates above another hamlet in Clent called Walton Pool and flows down to Holy Cross and then on to Broom where it is known as Gallows Brook. The third, and the shortest rises in Yieldingtree, but it supplies several old mill ponds before converging with the main stream just south of Blakedown.
- The Honey Brook, which enters from the right, opposite Wolverley Court, close to the Kidderminster suburb of Franche.
- The Horse Brook or Horsebrook, which also joins from the right, bringing water from the Shatterford and Kingsford areas, and from parts of South Staffordshire and Shropshire.
- The Mill Brook, which enters from the right at the Hyde, opposite Dunsley near Kinver, and drains an area within South Staffordshire to the north of Kinver.
- The River Smestow, also known as the Smestow Brook, the Stour's largest tributary, which enters from the right. The Smestow drains an area well to the north, originating in the northern suburbs of Wolverhampton, and looping around the city to flow past Wombourne and join the Stour at Prestwood.
- The Lutley Gutter, also known locally as the Pudding Brook, which enters from the left at Cradley and, together with the Stour itself, has played a major role in the industrial history of the town.

== Settlements ==
The main settlement on the Stour are, travelling upstream from its confluence with the River Severn:

=== In Worcestershire ===
- Stourport-on-Severn, traditionally a canal port and resort town, where the Stour joins the Severn.
- Kidderminster, an industrial and commercial centre.
- Wolverley, which is in the same parish as the neighbouring villages of Cookley and Caunsall.

=== In Staffordshire ===
- Kinver, once an important industrial village, but now mainly a residential and tourist centre.
- Stourton and Prestwood

=== In Dudley Metropolitan Borough in the West Midlands ===
- Stourbridge, with its suburbs of Wollaston (before 1974, part of Worcestershire) and Amblecote (historically part of Staffordshire), traditionally a centre of the glass industry.
- Lye, formerly a centre of heavy industry, now best known for its strip of Indian restaurants specialising in balti meals. Before 1974, part of Worcestershire.
- Cradley, once famous for its forges specialising in chain making. Before 1974, part of Worcestershire.
- Halesowen, also once a centre for forges, specialising in nail making, but now largely a residential and commercial area. Traditionally an exclave of Shropshire, from 1844 until 1974 it was part of Worcestershire.

=== In Worcestershire ===
- Romsley, where the Stour originates in a spring outside the main village but within the parish. Before 1844, part of Shropshire, together with Halesowen. 1974–1998: part of the County of Hereford and Worcester

== Gallery ==
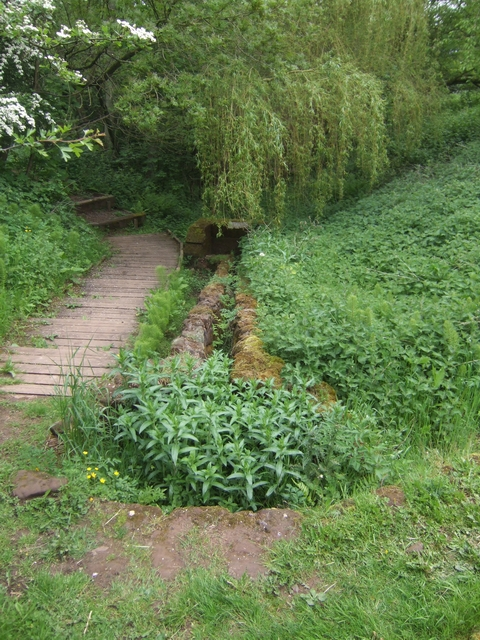
St Kenelm's Spring in Romsley, Worcestershire on the Clent Hills

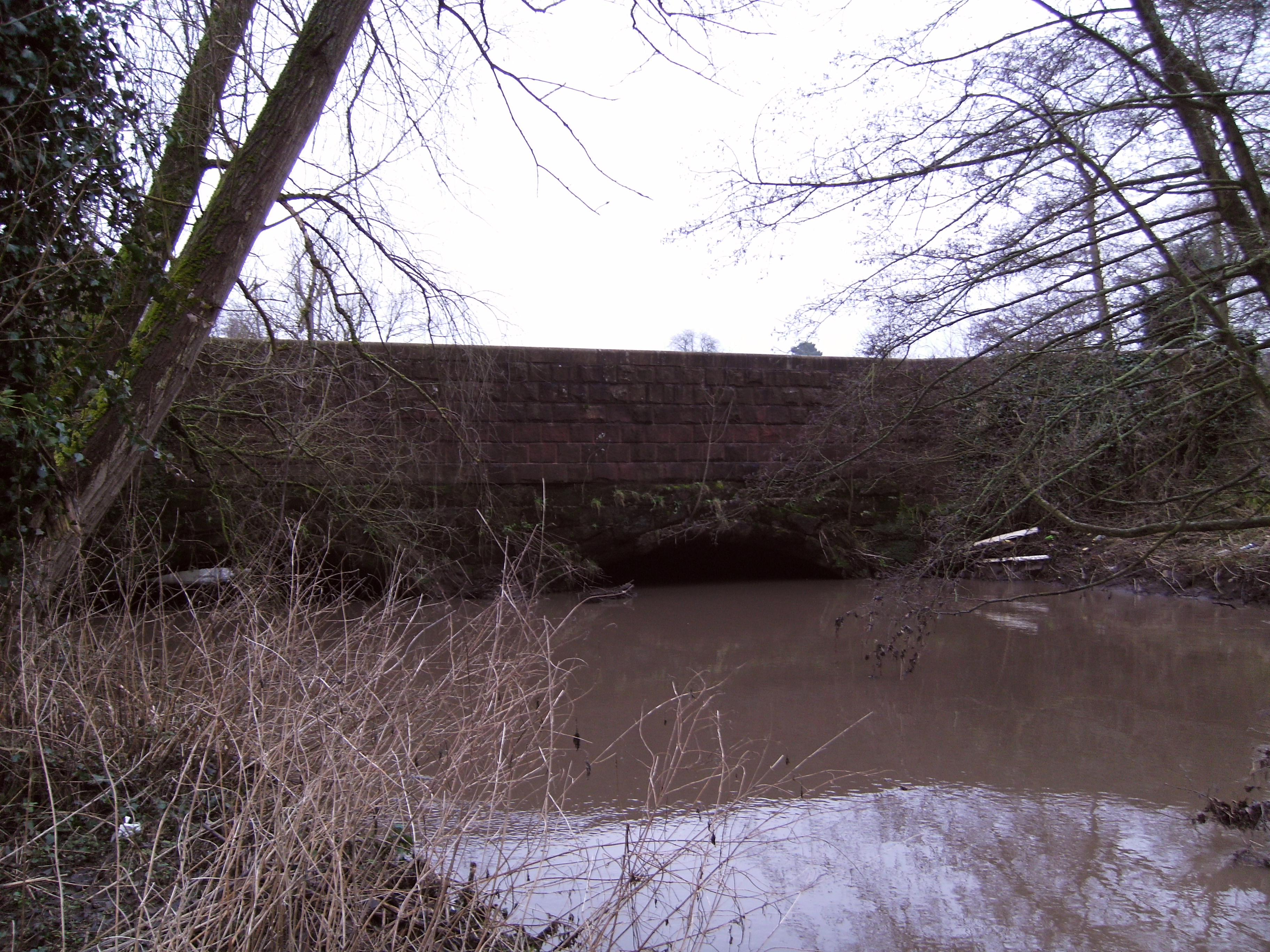
Sandstone aqueduct, carrying the Staffordshire and Worcestershire Canal over the Stour, a few metres before the river is joined by the River Smestow.

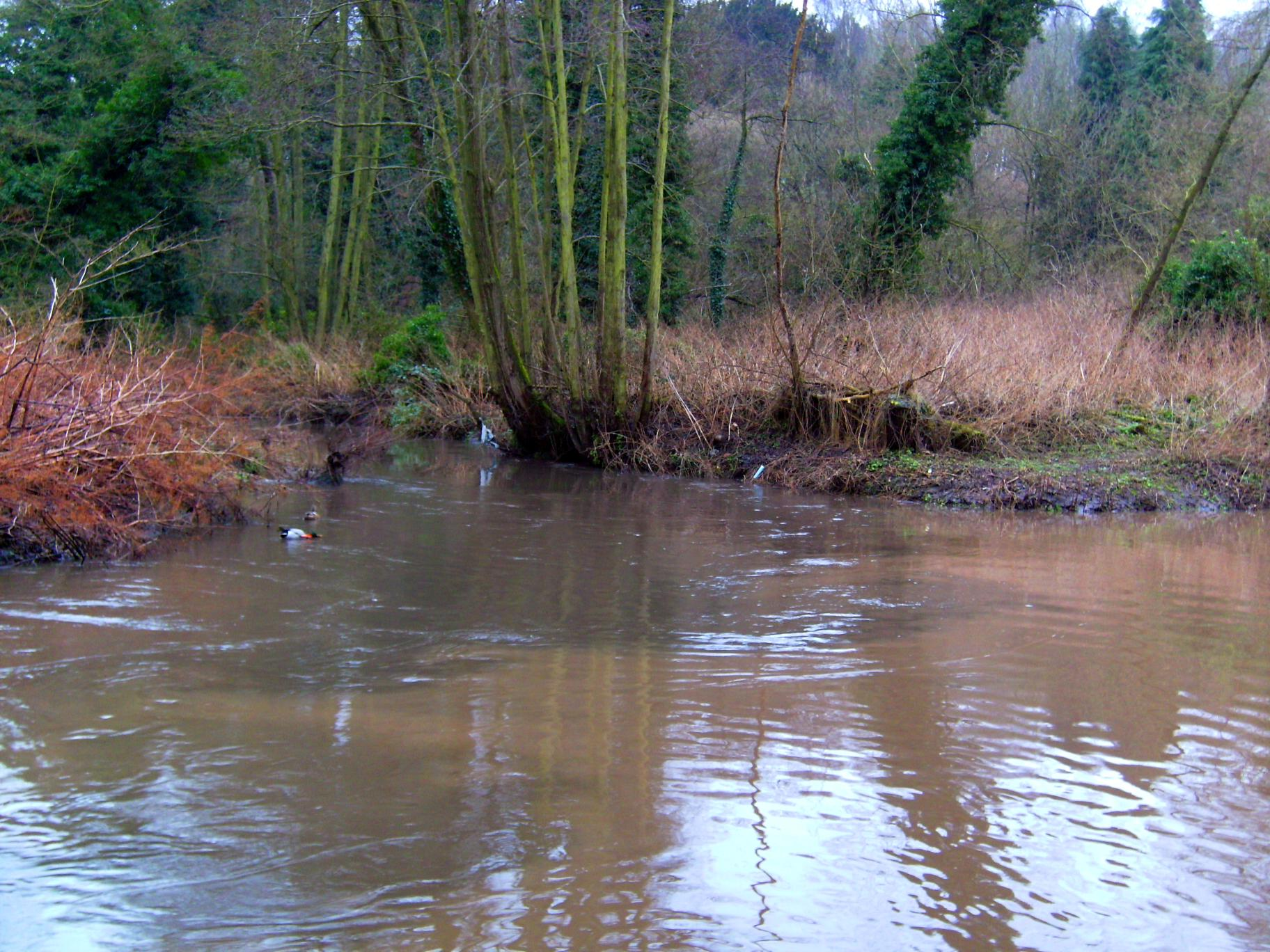
Confluence with the Smestow. After rain, the darker material from the tributary shows up very clearly as it flows into the sandy Stour.

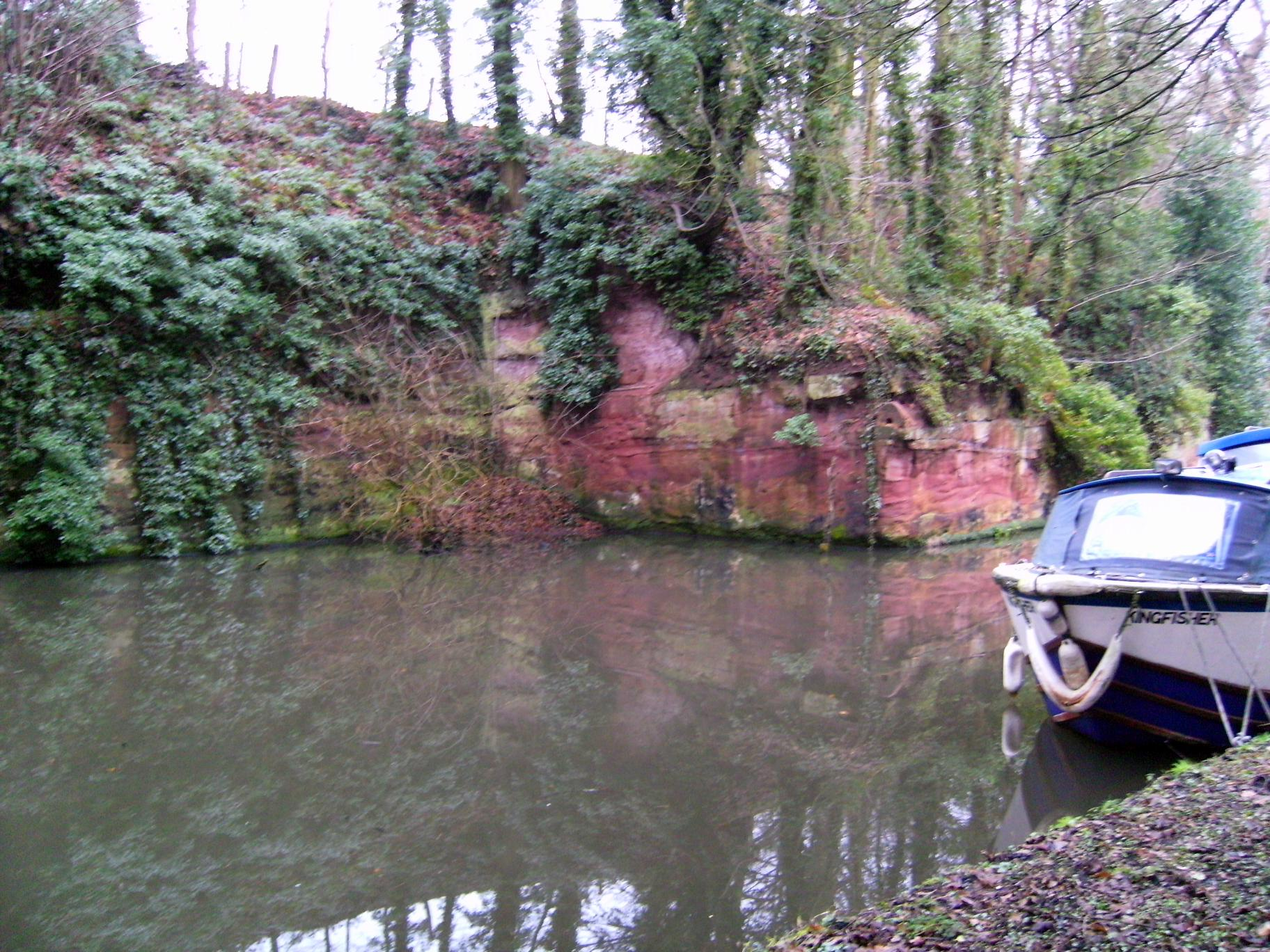
Steep cuttings in sandstone, north of Stourton, which make room for the canal alongside the river, illustrate the underlying geology of much of the river's course.

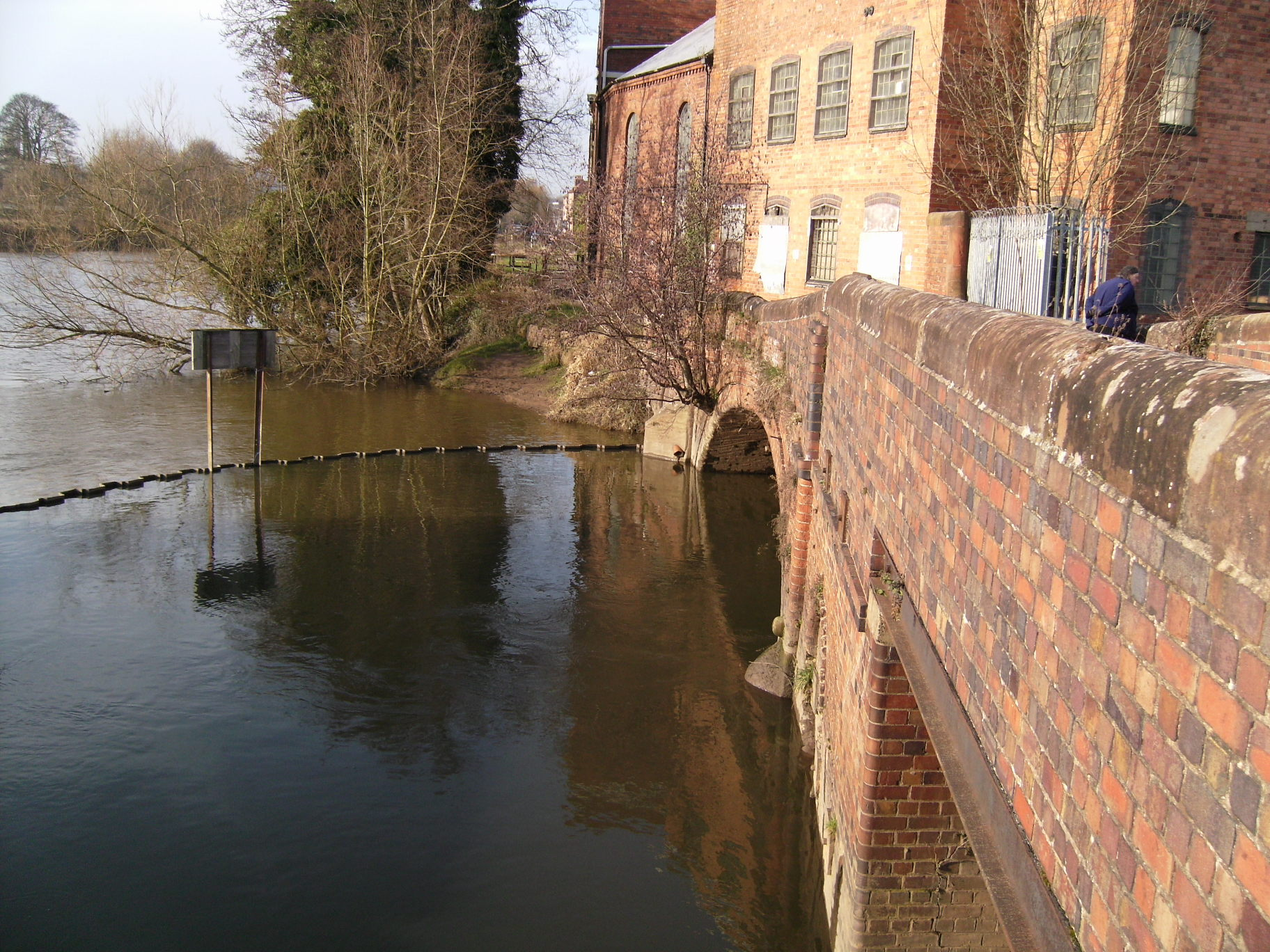
Confluence of River Stour with River Severn in old industrial area of Stourport-on-Severn, Worcestershire. The Stour flows from beneath a bridge, to the right.

== See also ==
- Rivers of the United Kingdom
