= Blakeshall =

Coordinates: 52.426841°N 2.247949°W

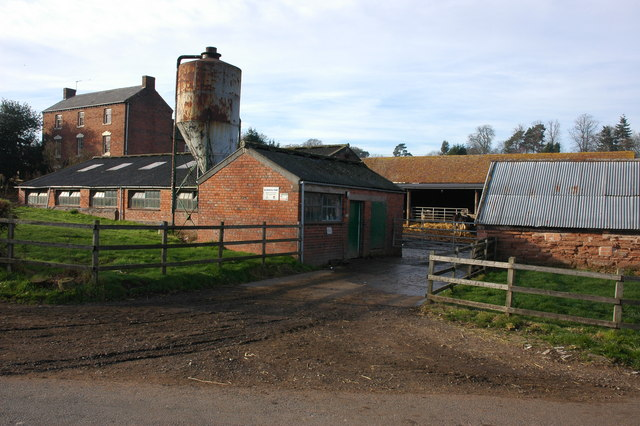
- Blakeshall Farm

- Location within Worcestershire
- OS grid reference: SO832810
  - London: 111 miles (179 km)
- Civil parish: Wolverley & Cookley
- District: Wyre Forest
- Shire county: Worcestershire
- Region: West Midlands
- Country: England
- Sovereign state: United Kingdom
- Post town: KIDDERMINSTER
- Postcode district: DY11
- Dialling code: 01562
- Police: West Mercia
- Fire: Hereford and Worcester
- Ambulance: West Midlands
- UK Parliament: Wyre Forest

Blakeshall is a hamlet in Worcestershire, England. It is one of the ancient townships of the manor of Wolverley, whose extent was similar to that of the modern civil parish of Wolverley and Cookley. The Wolverley and Cookley civil parish had a population of 4,960 in 2021.

== Early history ==
The Sebright family held land in Blakeshall from the end of the 13th or early 14th century until at least the mid-17th century. In 1809 Blakeshall was the property of a John Smith, from whom it passed to the Hancocks family.

== Blakeshall Hall ==
Blakeshall Hall is a grade II Listed Building, possibly 18th century, remodelled and extended in the 19th century.

== Hancocks Village ==
Blakeshall Hall and the surrounding Blakeshall Estate were owned by William Hancocks, a local ironmaster, from around 1844. Hancocks laid out a 'Swiss' style village on the Estate near the hamlet of Drakelow. This village was home to around 50 families; Blakeshall Common School being built in 1855 to serve around 72 children from the village, the nearby rock houses and the local area. In the 1890s the school became a mission chapel for a non-denominational society. The mission left in 1898 but the building remained in used for occasional chapel and church purposes until the 1920s when the Hall and Estate were sold to the Grazebrook family. During the Second World War, the village site became part of the Drakelow Tunnels shadow factory, later developed during the Cold War as a fall-back government centre. The old school building, the last evidence of the village, was demolished in the early 1980s. As of 2018 the area remains in private ownership and is not accessible to the public.

== Jennings Farm ==
Robert Plant of Led Zeppelin lived at Jennings Farm, Blakeshall in the 1970s. An early version of the Led Zeppelin song Bron-Y-Aur Stomp was recorded as "Jennings Farm Blues".

== Blakeshall Common ==
To the north of the old village, the former Blakeshall Common, although not within the ancient bounds of the manor of Kingsford, formed part of Kingsford Forest Park which is now incorporated into Kinver Edge.

== Gallery ==
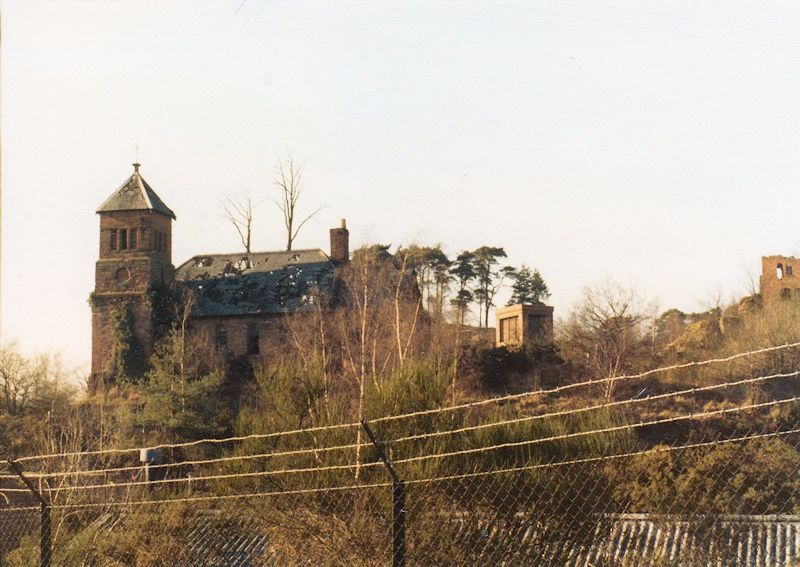
Blakeshall Common school in 1978
