= I.A.Recordings =

I.A.Recordings was founded in 1982 by a small group of volunteers, to record past and present industries on film and video, as a resource for industrial archaeology (I.A.).

When possible, they capture the processes and activities of an industry while it is still working; but moving pictures also add an extra dimension to the recording of industrial remains.

All the footage they shoot is kept in a storage archive for posterity}. From time to time, they produce edited programmes from some of the material, to make it available to the public on DVD.

== History ==
Their first project in 1982 was to work with the historian W.K.V.Gale to record the famous John Bradley Rolling Mill in the English Midlands, as it was due to close within a week and was the last of its kind in the area.

Since then they have recorded many industries, several of which have since closed. They have also produced several documentary history programmes, particularly about inland waterways (canals) and mining.

I.A.Recordings started in Britain but have since recorded sites in Ireland, Belgium, France, Germany, Poland, Spain and the United States.

They have developed their own specialist video technology such as helmet-mounted cameras for use underground and MineCam, a remote-controlled camera for mine shaft exploration.

I.A.Recordings use broadcast equipment and techniques and since 2005, high-definition video.

By 2008, they had over 38,000 minutes of original footage in the archive, but as they are voluntary they have only had time to edit a relatively small amount for release on DVD.

== Major subjects ==
Subjects already available for public viewing include a brickworks employing hand-moulders, making brass hames for horse harnesses, many locksmith workshops in Willenhall recorded for the Lock Museum, making files by hand, a history of the Shropshire Union Canal made for the Ironbridge Gorge Museum Trust, a history of the Birmingham Canal Navigations, building new canal tunnels in 1984 and 1989, the last run of 'Tom Pudding' compartment boats, a history of the Manchester Ship Canal, an underground tour of the ancient Clive Copper Mine, a history of Snailbeach Lead Mine, many mines in Ireland including Glengowla, Avoca, Glendalough, Glendasan, Glenmalur, Tara, Silvermines, Shalee, Allihies; Bunmahon and Tankardstown on the Copper Coast; and Ballycorus; Drakelow Tunnels factory, Carrs and other lead and zinc mines in the Nenthead area, working and disused Cornish mines including South Crofty, Geevor, Cligga Head, Rosevale, Taylor's & Michell's shafts near Redruth, Tolgus Tin Company, Wheal Jane and Kennall Vale Gunpowder Works; mines around Llangollen, Pontneddfechan Gunpowder Works, carrying pottery on the Caldon Canal, Donisthorpe Colliery, Alan Paine Knitwear, Bagworth Colliery, Helsington Snuff Mill, a steam-powered dredger, dry barrel coopering, Morse's Level coal mine, Charlecote water-powered flour mill, stone quarrying and cutting in the Forest of Dean, carrying newsprint and sewage effluent by canal, rescuing an ancient Severn trow sailing barge and then sailing it after restoration, the abandoned Wren's Nest limestone mines, a tanker carrying diesel on the River Humber and Aire and Calder navigation, compartment boats taking coal to Ferrybridge power station, an oak bark tanning works, large dragline excavators mining open pit coal, Annesley-Bentinck colliery, mines around Linares, Spain, and ancient mines in the Harz mountains of Germany.

I.A.Recordings also maintain a widely used collection of over 600 links to other Industrial Archaeology-related websites and host the Industrial Archaeology and History Web Ring.

== See also ==
- Association for Industrial Archaeology
- National Association of Mining History Organisations
- Council for British Archaeology
- British Film Institute
