= Sarah Baskerville =

English printer and businesswoman

- Born: Sarah Ruston c. 1708
- Died: 21 March 1788; Easy Hill, Birmingham, England
- Other names: Sarah Eaves; Mrs Eaves
- Occupations: Printer, typefounding businesswoman
- Known for: Managing the Baskerville printing and typefounding business after John Baskerville's death
- Spouse(s): Richard Eaves; John Baskerville
- Children: 5, by Richard Eaves

Sarah Baskerville (née Ruston; formerly Eaves; c. 1708 – 21 March 1788) was an English printer and businesswoman associated with the Birmingham printer, japanner and typefounder John Baskerville. She was John Baskerville's partner before their marriage, his wife from 1764, and the principal beneficiary of his estate. After his death in 1775 she retained control of the Baskerville printing and typefounding business, and works appeared with the imprint of Sarah or S. Baskerville.

Modern scholarship has described her as John Baskerville's "wife, business partner, and former housekeeper". Although long treated mainly as a figure in John Baskerville's biography, she was active in the commercial and domestic world of Easy Hill, Birmingham, and was responsible for preserving and disposing of the Baskerville printing materials after his death.

== Early life and first marriage ==
Sarah was born Sarah Ruston, from a family resident in the Deritend area of Birmingham. On 17 August 1724, when she was about sixteen, she married Richard Eaves. The marriage produced five children, but Eaves deserted her, and the couple were legally separated in 1745.

Three years after the separation, Sarah and her children moved in with John Baskerville. The relationship was socially unconventional: Sarah and Baskerville lived together as husband and wife for about sixteen years before they were legally able to marry after Richard Eaves's death.

== Life with John Baskerville ==
Sarah married John Baskerville on 1 June 1764 at St Martin's, Birmingham. John Baskerville was already established as a successful japanner and was becoming known for his work as a printer, typefounder and typographic innovator. The couple had no children together.

Lady Shelburne, describing a visit to Easy Hill in May 1766, wrote that John Baskerville showed visitors the garden and hothouse, while "Mrs. Baskerville" showed them "the Japan, which business she has chiefly the management of".

Sarah's role at Easy Hill was not merely domestic. Caroline Archer-Parré has described her as Baskerville's business partner as well as his wife, and notes that Baskerville's will made her the major beneficiary of both money and property. An earlier trust had already secured Easy Hill for Sarah's use, and the will made it "entirely her own", giving her authority over the estate after Baskerville's death.

A surviving copper pass for the New Street Theatre, Birmingham, engraved for "Mrs Baskerville", has been attributed to Sarah Baskerville. Symons notes that neither John nor Sarah Baskerville appears to have owned a share in the theatre, so the pass is evidence not of proprietorship but of Sarah's place in the social and cultural networks of Birmingham in the 1770s.

== Widowhood and printing business ==
John Baskerville died in January 1775. Sarah retained control of the printing house and typefounding materials. Older bibliographical accounts state that she carried on the printing business for a time, that two books bear the imprint of Sarah Baskerville, and that she continued the typefounding side of the business until 1777.

The clearest surviving imprint is David Jennings's An Introduction to the Knowledge of Medals, printed in Birmingham in 1775 by Sarah Baskerville and sold by Joseph Johnson in London. The Dictionary of National Biography also lists a 1777 edition of Horace, Quintus Horatius Flaccus, with the imprint "typis S. Baskerville". The 19th century edition of the DNB incorrectly states "This appears to be the ‘Horace’ of 1762 with new title-page." Comparison between the two editions clearly shows Sarah Baskerville's edition is freshly reset in 1777.

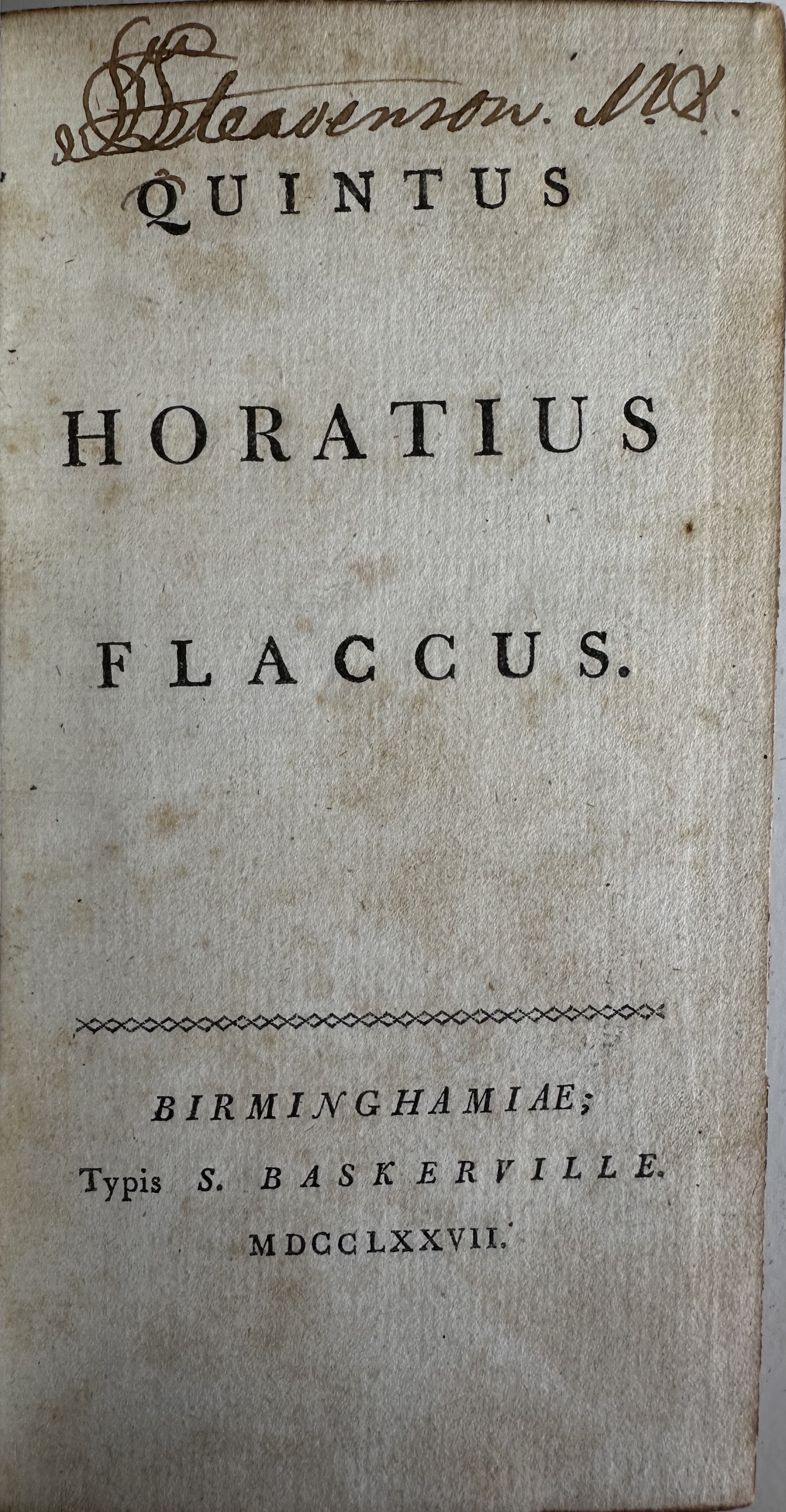
Title page of Sarah Baskerville's edition of Quintus Horatius Flaccus (ESTC T46244)

In 1779 Sarah sold the remaining Baskerville printing equipment, including machinery, types and punches, to Pierre-Augustin Caron de Beaumarchais. The material was used in connection with the Kehl edition of Voltaire, carrying Baskerville's types into continental European printing history.

== Death and estate ==
Sarah Baskerville died on 21 March 1788 at her house at Easy Hill, Birmingham. After her death, the Easy Hill estate was auctioned by her executors and bought by John Ryland, the freeholder, who made it his home. The Dictionary of National Biography states that Sarah was buried near the east end of St Philip's Church, Birmingham.

== Legacy ==
Sarah Baskerville's historical reputation has been closely tied to that of John Baskerville, but recent work has increasingly emphasised her own agency as a business partner, widow, printer and custodian of the Baskerville materials. Her importance is also reflected in modern typography: in 1996 Zuzana Licko designed the typeface Mrs Eaves, a revival inspired by Baskerville types and named after Sarah Eaves, the name by which Sarah was known before her marriage to John Baskerville.

== Selected works with Sarah Baskerville imprint ==
Year	Work	Imprint note
1775	David Jennings, An Introduction to the Knowledge of Medals	"Printed by Sarah Baskerville"; listed in the Grub Street Project and ESTC-linked bibliographical records.
1777	Quintus Horatius Flaccus	Listed by the Dictionary of National Biography with the imprint "typis S. Baskerville".

== See also ==
- John Baskerville
- Baskerville
- Mrs Eaves
