= Stambermill Viaduct =

Viaduct in Stourbridge, England

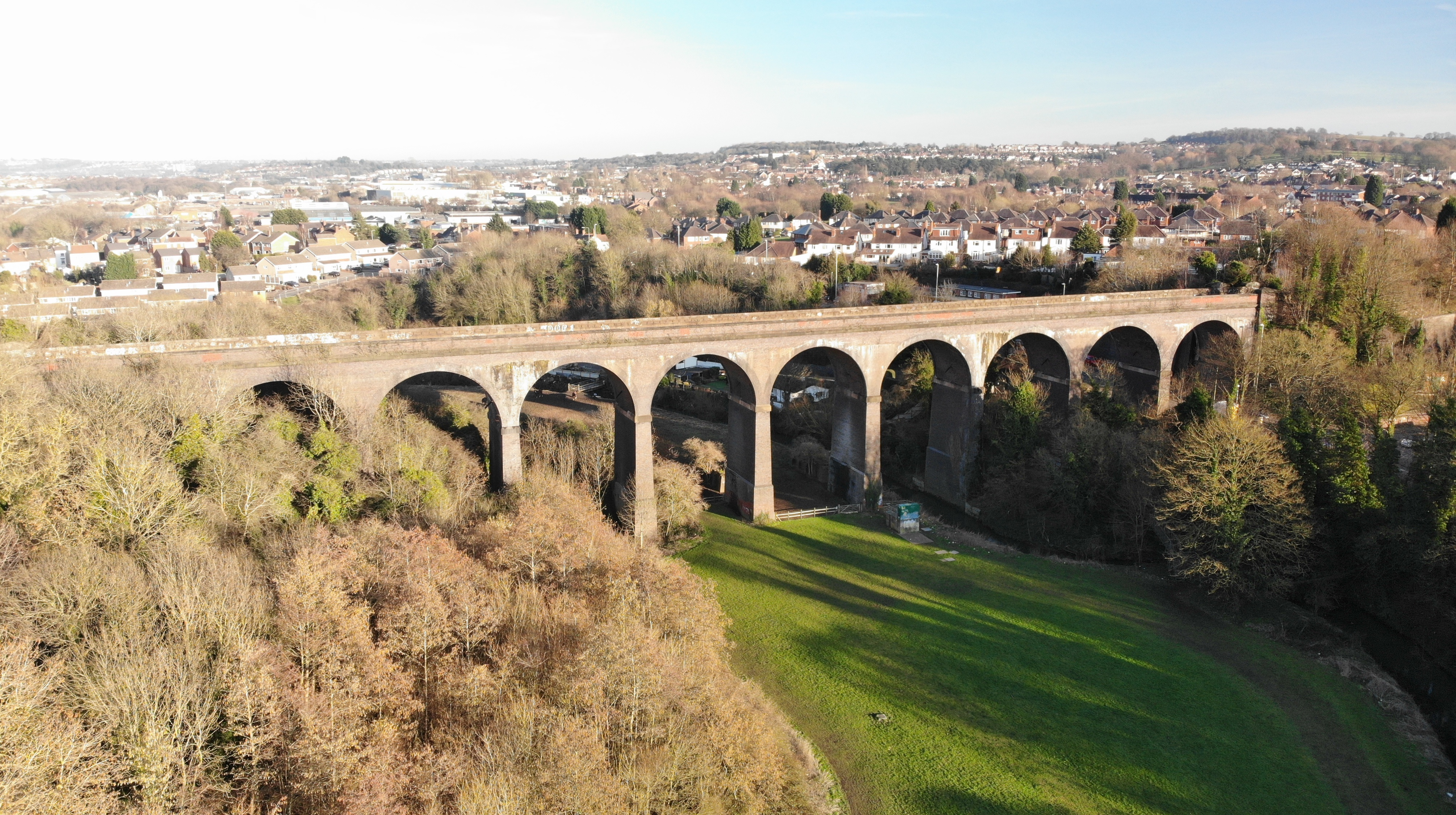
- Coordinates: 52°27′28″N 2°08′03″W
- Crosses: River Stour
- Locale: Stourbridge, West Midlands
- Maintained by: Network Rail

Characteristics
- Design: arch bridge
- Material: Brick
- Total length: 190 yards (170 m)
- Height: 94 feet (29 m)

History
- Opened: 1852

Location
- Interactive map of Stambermill Viaduct

Stambermill Village Viaduct, also known as Stourbridge Viaduct, is a railway bridge located on the northern side of Stourbridge in the West Midlands of England. It was built in timber to a design by Isambard Kingdom Brunel in 1852 and rebuilt in brick 30 years later. It has 10 arches and carries the railway across the River Stour.

== History ==
The viaduct was built for the Oxford, Worcester and Wolverhampton Railway (OWW). The OWW was under the influence of the Great Western Railway (GWR) and so commissioned the GWR's chief engineer, Isambard Kingdom Brunel, to survey the route for its line. Brunel designed three similar viaducts within the space of eight miles (12 kilometres) between Kidderminster and Stourbridge—the Hoo Brook Viaduct, shortly after leaving Kidderminster, Blakedown Viaduct, and Stambermill Viaduct. Brunel supervised the early stages of the construction of the line, including the three viaducts, and it opened from 1852.

To save costs, Brunel designed all three viaducts as timber structures. The engineer famously used timber on his Cornwall Railway viaducts but contemporary photographs show that the OWW viaducts had little else in common with those in Cornwall. All three were replaced with Staffordshire blue brick arch structures in the 1880s—Stambermill between 1881 and 1882.

Stembermill Viaduct opened with the line in 1853 and was rebuilt in brick from 1881 to 1882. It carried passenger trains until 1964. It is still in use by freight trains serving the Round Oak Steel Terminal in Brierley Hill. A reopening of the South Staffordshire Line as part West Midlands Metro tram network is under consideration. The viaduct was subject to six weeks of maintenance and improvement works in September 2013.

== Description ==
Stambermill Viaduct carries the railway line across the River Stour, its valley, and Birmingham Street. It has ten equal arches and is 190 yards (170 metres) long, making the longest of the three viaducts on this stretch of line. It reaches a maximum height of 94 feet (29 metres) above the river. The arches are supported by tapering piers at the top of which are tall plinths and impost bands from which the arches spring. At the Birmingham Street end is a substantial buttress, containing a blind arch, and wing wall. The bridge is a Grade II listed building, first designated in September 1971, a status which provides it legal protection.

== Gallery ==
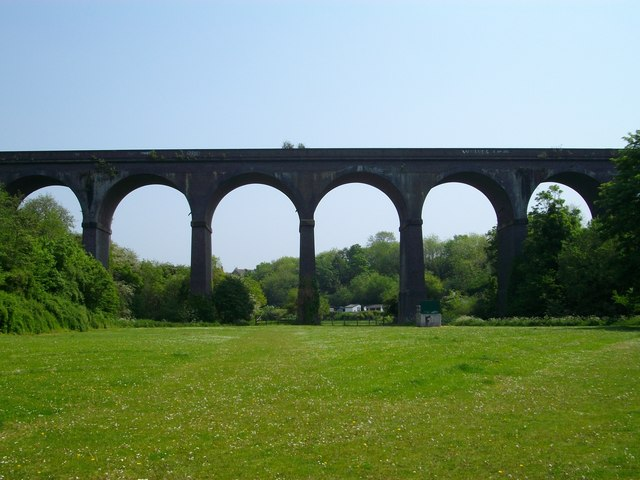

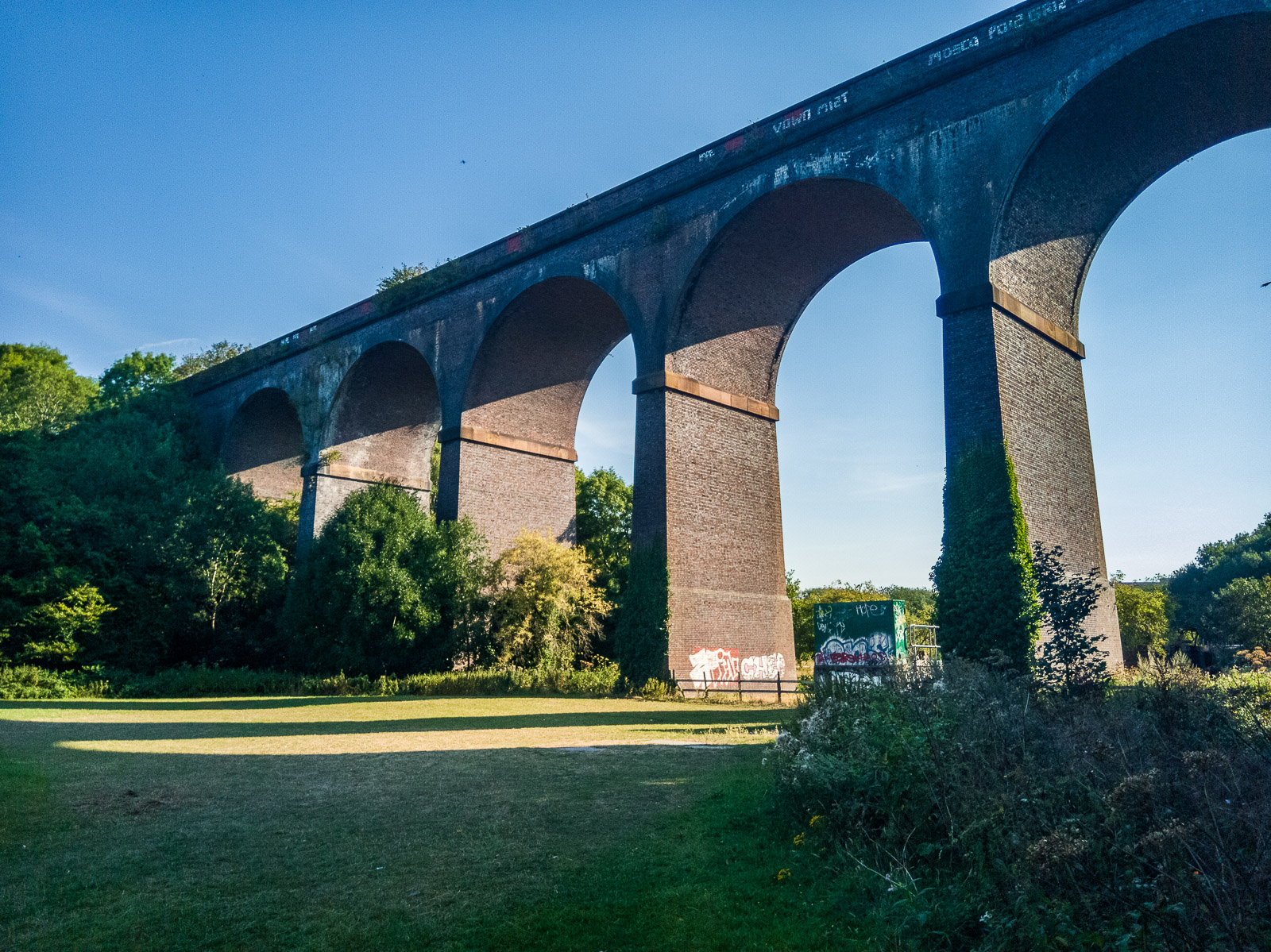
