= MineCam =

Remote exploration camera by I.A.Recordings

MineCam Mk 4

The MineCam is a remote exploration camera built by I.A.Recordings. It is used for mine shaft exploration and other similar environments. It was originally conceptualized in 1988, and since went under several design revisions. The name MineCam, is a pun on MiniCam, an early hand-held broadcast camera built by CBS Laboratories.

== History ==
Peter Eggleston of I.A.Recordings first had the idea for what became "MineCam" in 1988. He had been visiting some metal mines in Wales with the Shropshire Caving and Mining Club and spent several hours setting up a single rope technique rig to descend a remote shaft, only to find that there were no ways off at the bottom. This was the motivation to build a miniature camera which would allow enthusiasts to explore hard to reach, unsafe, or impossible to reach areas.

The remote exploration of mines prior to 1988 had been done commercially for several years by pipeline camera firms using equipment that needed to be housed in a vehicle and powered by a generator. Many old mine shafts are remote from roads though, so Peter's final goal was a small lightweight battery-powered kit which could be carried on foot. The first two versions of MineCam did not achieve this, but tested various approaches with the video technology available at the time.

== Versions ==
=== MineCam 1 ===
MineCam 1 used a monochrome vidicon camera in a waterproof housing made out of a 10 cm plastic sewer pipe and fittings, with an acrylic window. This was successfully tested in the deep end of a swimming pool. The camera was insensitive - it needed a 150 W lamp, which required a 240 V supply, but so did the camera. The cable was 100 m of video co-axial and power, taped together at 2 m intervals and numbered to give a crude depth measurement. The camera and lamp were heavy, so an old 6 mm static climbing rope was used to support it. The monitor was a 10 cm portable TV.

MineCam 1 worked, but the monochrome image was sometimes difficult to interpret. It was time to try colour, and this was not yet available from the commercial shaft inspection firms.

=== MineCam 2 ===
MineCam 2 used parts from a disused Sony 'Handycam.' The colour CCD chip was removed and put in a round tobacco tin connected by a short cable to the rest of the electronics in a small Eddystone die-cast box. The 'Eddy box' contained extra hardware to convert the Y/C (700 kHz) direct colour-under output to composite PAL, and provide various unusual power supply voltages. Because of the colour stripe filter and the early technology, this CCD was only as sensitive as the monochrome vidicon.

Both MineCam 1 and 2 needed to be lowered twice to investigate a shaft. First, they were lowered looking vertically down, and notes made of the depth and heading of any interesting features. The camera was then hauled to the surface and re-rigged to look horizontally at the interesting items found earlier. A remote tilt mechanism was needed as it would halve the time and effort.

To indicate heading, MineCams 1 and 2 used an ordinary spherical fluid-mounted car compass on an aluminium arm about 30 cm from the camera. A supplementary lens (from an old pair of spectacles) glued to the acrylic window brought the compass into focus at the corner of the frame.

=== MineCam 3 ===
Mark 3 was radically different. A high quality colour camera became available, a Pulnix TMC-X not much bigger than a Mini-Maglite. It was also much more sensitive, so the light could be smaller and a remote tilt mechanism became practicable. A coded control signal was needed that would go down the video cable to save using extra wires, so a model radio control system was adapted, giving 2 proportional channels for tilt and eventual pan movements. The 27 MHz carrier was easily combined and split from the baseband video. The first tilt motor was a standard model control servo with 180 degree rotation. The camera head and light were mounted in an open-framework cage about 25 cm long, rotated on a horizontal axis by the servo. Despite taking care, motor gears were frequently stripped when the cage hit obstacles and the servo had to be replaced regularly! The light source needed to pan with the camera, so had to be small enough to fit in the cage. A 12 V 50 W quartz-halogen lamp with 5 cm diameter integral dichroic reflector was fitted, powered from a small switch-mode PSU. Although the lighting power had been reduced, it still required a high voltage supply down the cable to reduce voltage drop, so 240 V was still used.

The cage rotated in an aluminium yoke attached to the bottom of a waterproof plastic box containing the rest of the electronics, including a power supply for the camera.

To be able to use the system in locations remote from mains power and not accessible by a vehicle carrying a generator, I.A.Recordings obtained a 150 W inverter and 12V lead-acid battery from an outdoor leisure shop.

MineCam 3 was the first to use an electronic compass for heading display. Tandy (Radio Shack) had developed a device using a flux gate sensor to give x & y components of the Earth's magnetic field which drove the orthogonal windings of a 360 degree mechanical indicator, for use as a car compass. I.A.Recordings discarded the indicator and used the x & y voltages to control the position of a flashing spot added to the video picture. This gave a compass-circle type display on screen. If the x (east-west) signal was inverted, when looking vertically down, the spot appeared to be fixed above a point on the ground as the camera rotated.

Electromagnetic interference from the switch mode power supply and harmonics of its square-wave power waveform appeared in the video signal as noise. This was reduced by careful layout, screening and the use of a single-point ground return.

The miniature camera was waterproofed by sliding it into a square-section 25 mm wide aluminium tube (only slightly bigger than the camera), with a glass window glued in one end, and a cable gland at the other. The waterproof container sold for this camera was too large and heavy for the MineCam, but the aluminium tube is not as watertight. It has an IP rating of between 66 and 67.

=== MineCam 4 ===
For MineCam 4, the final major development was a pan motor. It was difficult to arrange a system which allowed 360 degree rotation of the tilt yoke whilst maintaining connections for video, tilt servo, lighting power, camera power and flux-gate sensor. An RS Components geared dc servo motor was used, driven from the remote control receiver, and a thrust bearing and Oldham coupler. The motor's powerful magnet interfered with the compass sensor so a sheet of mu-metal donated by a helpful local firm was formed into a screen round the whole motor & gearbox assembly. The tilt servo did not seem to cause the same problem, as it is smaller and rotates with the sensor on the yoke. Wherever possible, all hardware is plastic or non-ferrous metal.

Other improvements in MineCam 4 include a high-torque tilt servo, a microphone with balanced amplifier, a laser diode module beside the camera to produce a spot of light on the subject for range and size estimation and experimentation with bat detection and gas sensors.

The control box is 18 cm × 13 cm × 6 cm and contains a power supply, the servo control transmitter and a video equaliser. The cable is now 200 m of thin multi-core containing one coaxial and 5 single wires. As it is not load-bearing, a rope still has to be used and 9 mm static climbing rope was found to be better than anything thinner, including wire rope, at preventing twist. The rope often becomes tangled with the cable, so I.A.Recordings is still looking for a weight-bearing cable. The 180 degree tilt range allows the underside of shaft caps to be inspected. Compared with commercial versions which were still monochrome and used a mirror to switch the image from vertical to horizontal, the MineCam was much more flexible, and the goal of having a complete system that could be carried by individuals on foot had been reached. The picture was recorded on U-Matic, then Hi-8 and now on mini-DV tape.

== Rigging ==
To get the camera out over the centre of larger shafts, I.A.Recordings use either a scaffold pole with a pulley on the end, or for shafts that have run-in so the crater on the surface is several metres wide, they have developed a "Tyrolean traverse" or "Blondin" arrangement. A large diameter pulley (a Sinclair C5 wheel) is mounted on a trolley which is winched along a wire rope slung across the shaft and kept in tension. When the pulley is centred, the traverse rope is locked-off and the camera lowering rope can be released.

The 50 W lamp & reflector is a convenient size and is available in a variety of beam-widths, but the idea of the dichroic reflector preventing heat being reflected forward is actually a disadvantage for the MineCam. The lamp head has to be enclosed to protect it and to screen the power supply interference, but without careful internal design of reflectors and baffles, the housing can get very hot.

MineCam 4 has proved reliable and useful and gives a high-quality colour picture good enough to use in video productions. It is featured for example in the I.A.Recordings video "Snailbeach".
