= Drakelow Hillfort =

Hillfort in Worcestershire, England

Coordinates: 52°25′32″N 2°15′52″W

Drakelow Hillfort is a small multivallate Iron Age hillfort, located on a promontory (known as Drakelow Hill) at Drakelow at the southern end of Kinver Edge, in the civil parish of Wolverley and Cookley, Worcestershire. The hillfort is a scheduled monument.
