= John Baskerville =

English businessman and type designer (1707–1775)

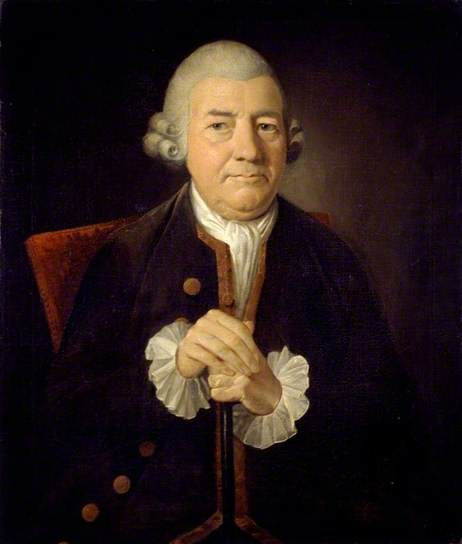
- John Baskerville in later life, oil on canvas by James Millar
- Born: 28 January 1707 (baptised); Wolverley, England
- Died: 8 January 1775 (age 68); Easy Hill, Birmingham, England
- Monuments: Industry and Genius
- Occupations: Manufacturer, printer and type designer
- Spouse: Sarah Ruston (Eaves)

John Baskerville (baptised 28 January 1707 – 8 January 1775) was an English businessman, in areas including japanning and papier-mâché, but he is best remembered as a printer and type designer. He was also responsible for inventing "wove paper", which was considerably smoother than "laid paper", allowing for sharper printing results.

== Life ==
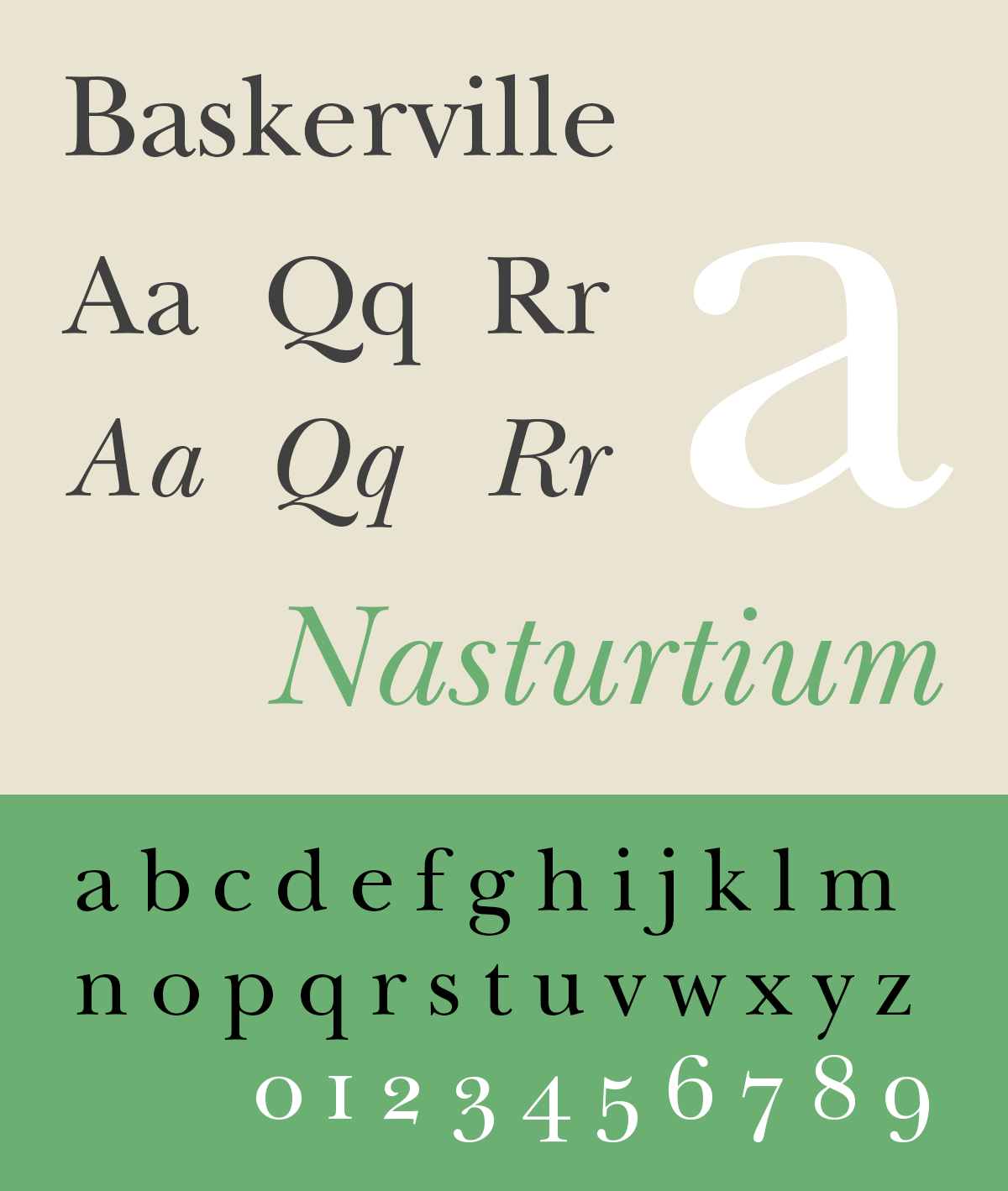
A modern sample of the 'Baskerville' typeface

Baskerville was born in the village of Wolverley, near Kidderminster in Worcestershire, and baptised on 28 January 1706 OS (1707 NS) at Wolverley church. Baskerville established an early career teaching handwriting, and is known to have offered his services cutting gravestones (a demonstration slab by him survives in the Library of Birmingham) before making a considerable fortune from the manufacture of lacquerwork items (japanning).

He practised as a printer in Birmingham, England. Baskerville was a member of the Royal Society of Arts, and an associate of some of the members of the Lunar Society.

Baskerville directed his punchcutter, John Handy, in the design of many typefaces of broadly similar appearance. His typefaces were greatly admired by Benjamin Franklin, a fellow printer, but were criticised by jealous competitors and soon fell out of favour. He also pioneered a completely new style of typography, adding wide margins and leading between each line.

In 1757, Baskerville published a remarkable quarto edition of Virgil on wove paper, using his own type. It took three years to complete, but it made such an impact that he was appointed printer to the University of Cambridge the following year. An atheist, he nonetheless printed The Book of Common Prayer in 1762 and a splendid folio Bible in 1763.

Baskerville innovated in printing, paper, and ink production. He worked with paper maker James Whatman to produce a smoother whiter paper, sometimes called wove paper, which showcased his strong black type.

== Death and interments ==
Baskerville died in January 1775 at his home, Easy Hill. He requested that his body be placed

in a Conical Building in my own premises Hearetofore used as a mill which I have lately Raised Higher and painted and in a vault which I have prepared for It. This Doubtless to many may appear a Whim perhaps It is so—But it is a whim for many years Resolve'd upon, as I have a Hearty Contempt for all Superstition the Farce of a Consecrated Ground the Irish Barbarism of Sure and Certain Hopes &c I also consider Revelation as it is call'd Exclusive of the Scraps of Morality casually Intermixt with It to be the most Impudent Abuse of Common Sense which Ever was Invented to Befool Mankind.

However, in 1821 a canal was built through the land and his body was placed on show by the landowner until Baskerville's family and friends arranged to have it moved to the crypt of Christ Church, Birmingham. Christ Church was demolished in 1897 so his remains were then moved, with other bodies from the crypt, to consecrated catacombs at Warstone Lane Cemetery. In 1963 a petition was presented to Birmingham City Council requesting that he be reburied in unconsecrated ground, according to his wishes. However, the petition was unsuccessful, and Baskerville remains in Warstone Lane cemetery.

== Legacy ==
The 20th century renewed interest in and appreciation for Baskerville's typefaces. His most notable typeface, Baskerville, is held to represent the peak of transitional type face and a bridge between Old Style and Modern type design. Since the 1920s, many fonts based on his work—mostly called 'Baskerville'— have been released by Linotype, Monotype, and other type foundries. In 1996, Emigre released a popular revival of this typeface called Mrs Eaves after Baskerville's wife, Sarah Eaves.

== Commemoration ==
In the 1930s, Baskerville House was built on the grounds of Easy Hill.

In 1947, BBC radio broadcast a radio play about his burial, named Hic Jacet: or The Corpse in the Crescent (Note: Baskerville's home and burial place were adjacent to The Crescent, laid out from 1795.) by Neville Brandon Watts. The original recording was not preserved but a performance was staged by students at the Birmingham School of Acting in 2013 at the Typographic Hub Centre of Birmingham City University. A copy of the script is in the Norman Painting Archives at the University of Birmingham.

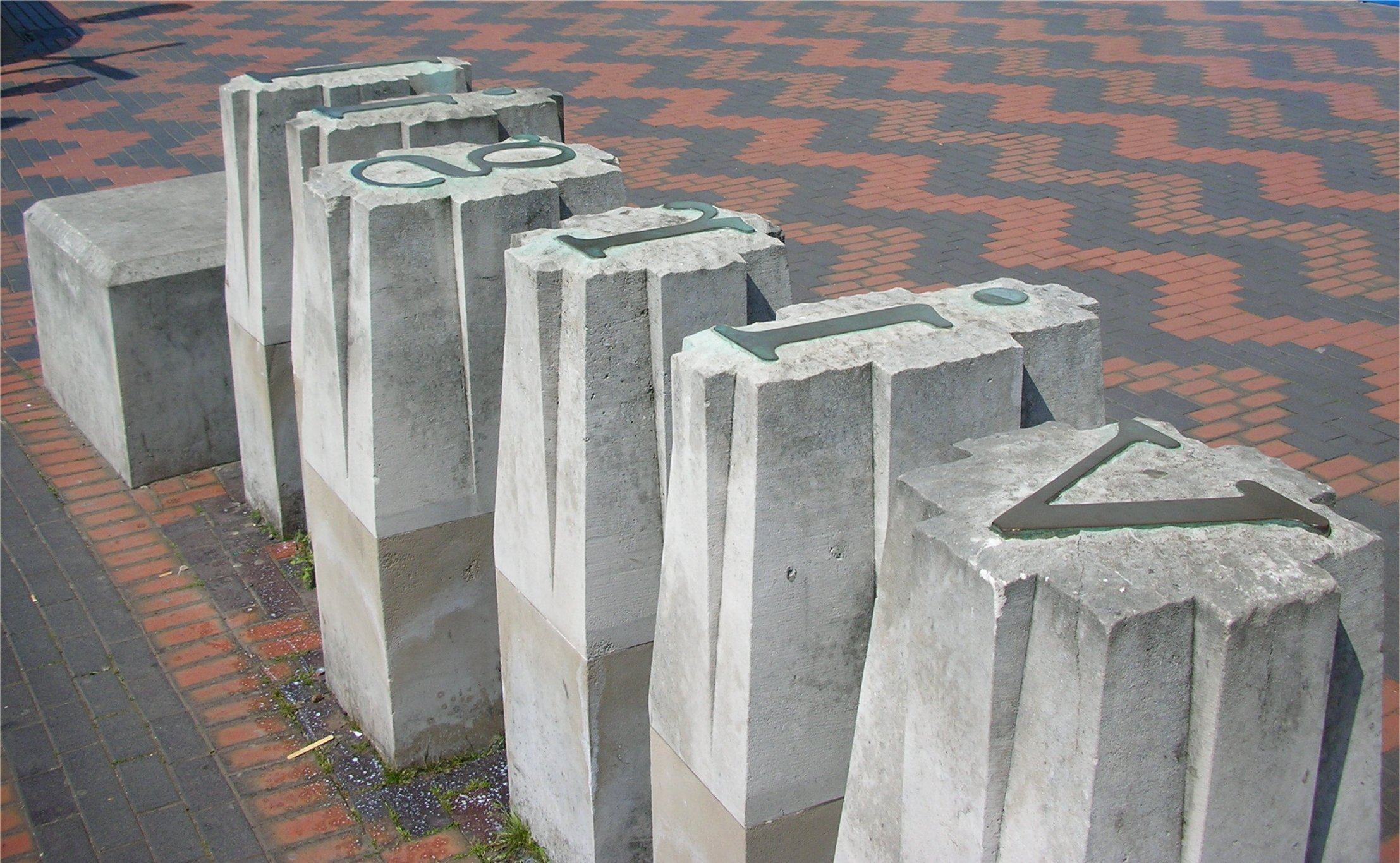
Industry and Genius, 1990, by David Patten, sculpture in Centenary Square

A Portland stone sculpture of the Baskerville typeface, Industry and Genius, in his honour stands in front of Baskerville House in Centenary Square, Birmingham. It was created by local artist David Patten in 1990.

== Gallery ==
Some examples of volumes published by Baskerville.

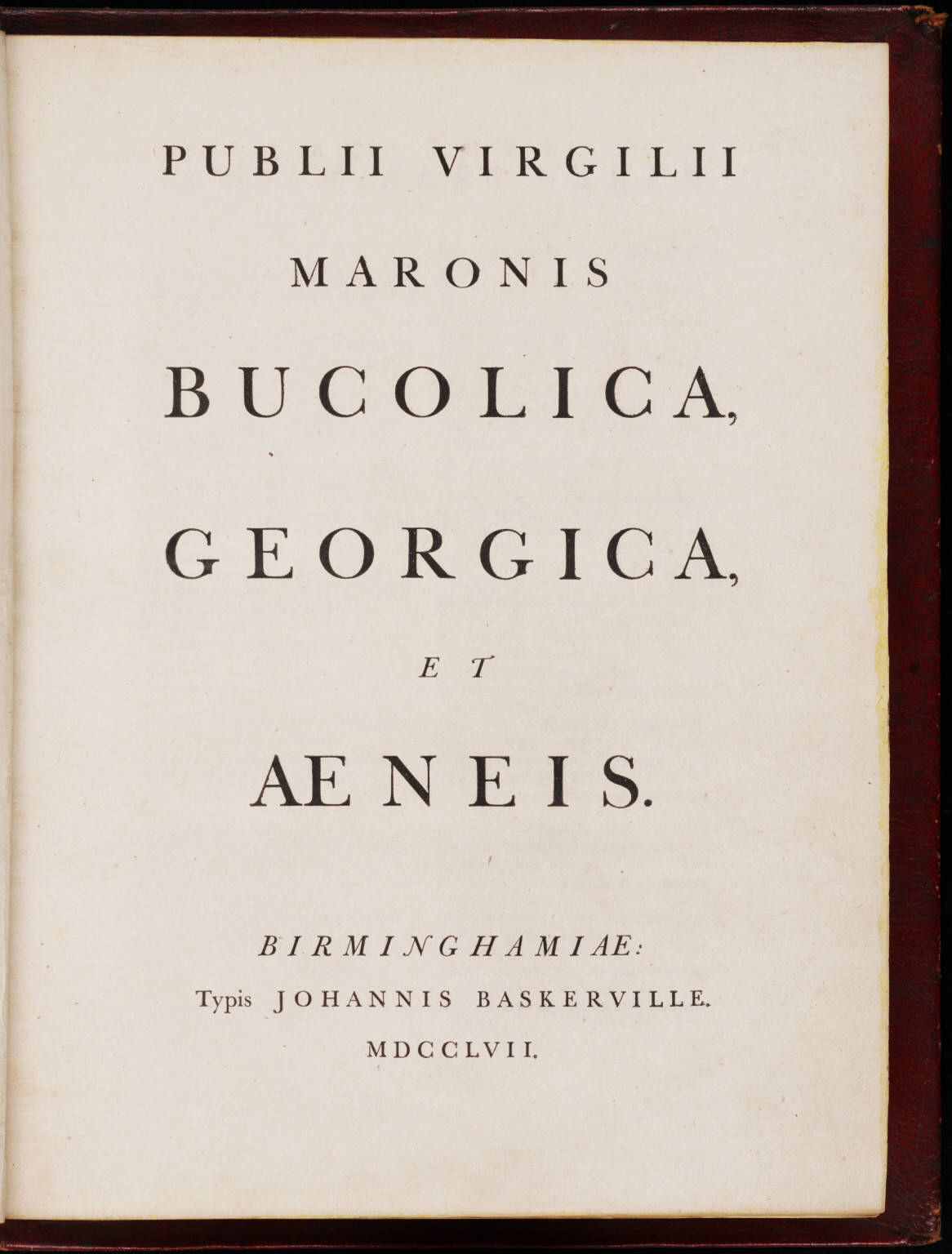
Title-page of the 1757 quarto edition of the works of Virgil

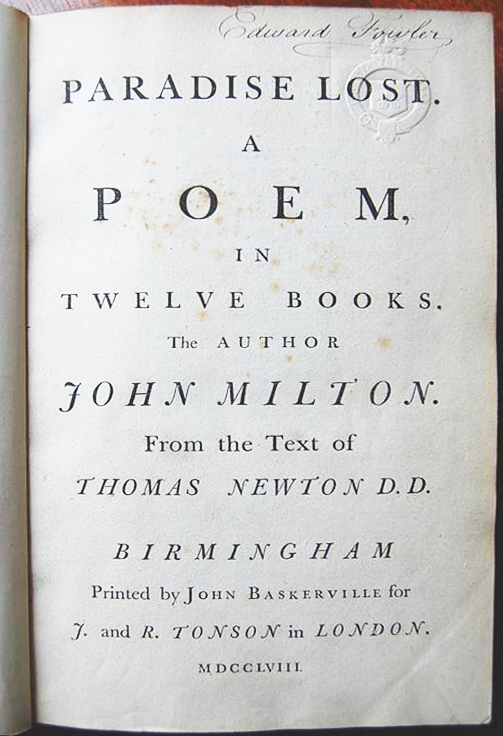
John Milton's Paradise Lost (1758)

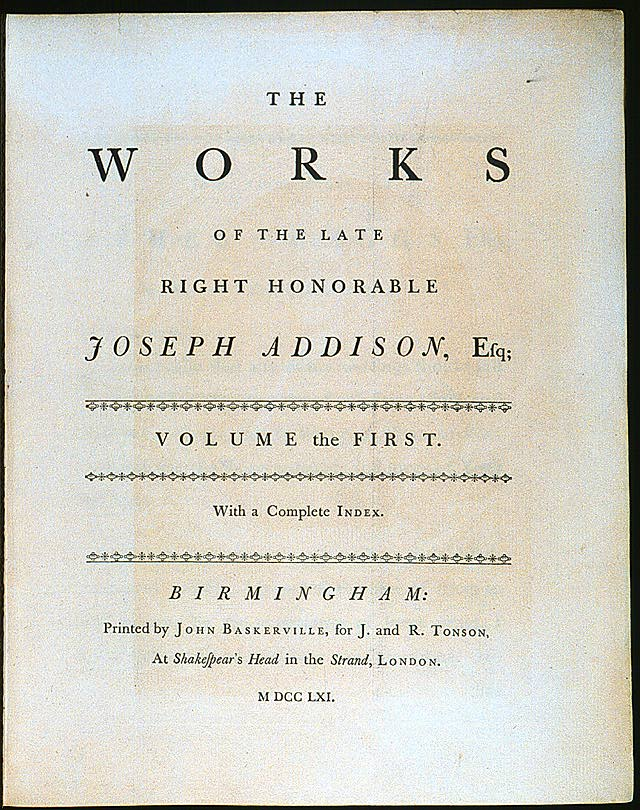
Volume One of The works of Joseph Addison (1761)

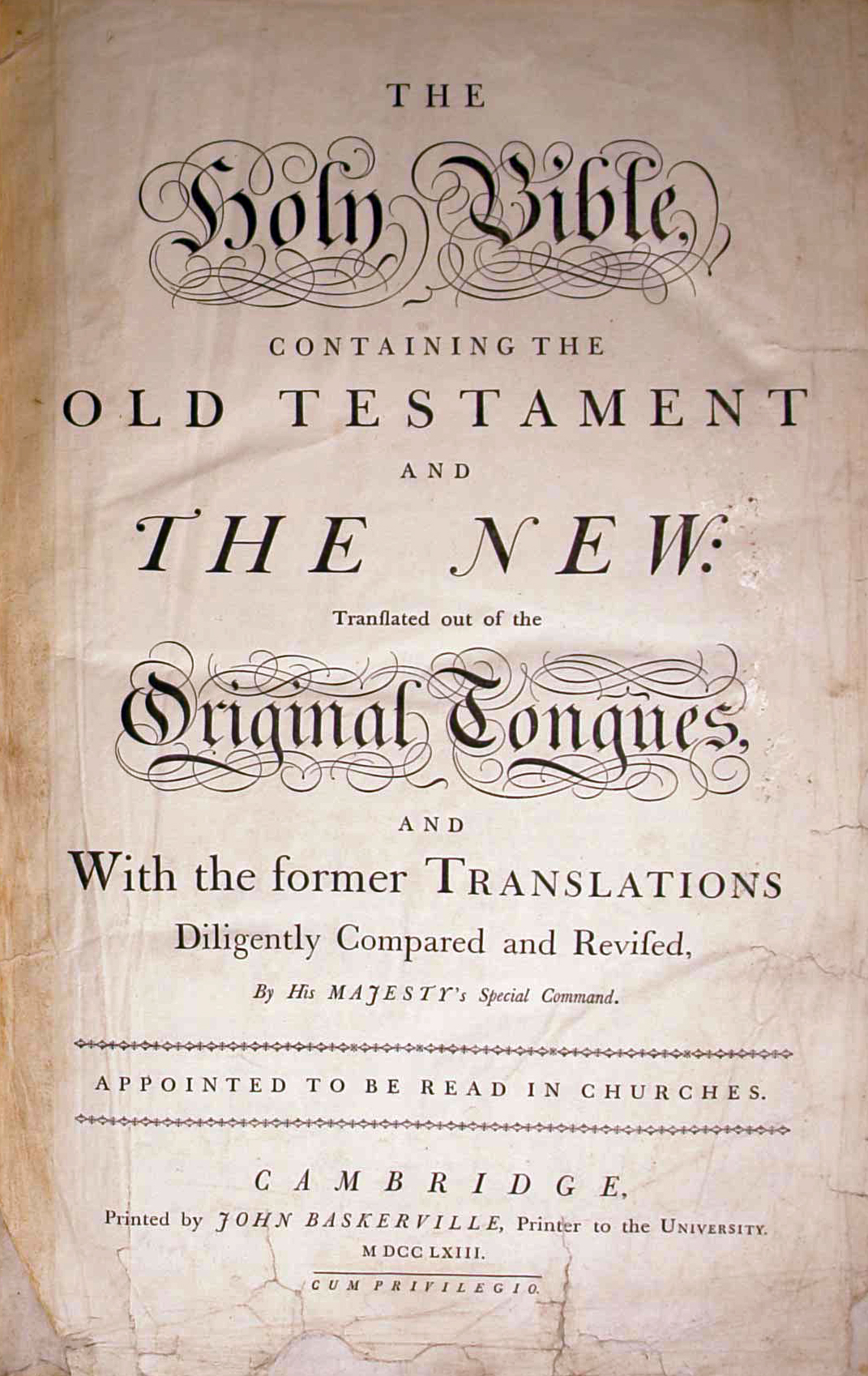
Title-page of Baskerville's 1763 Bible

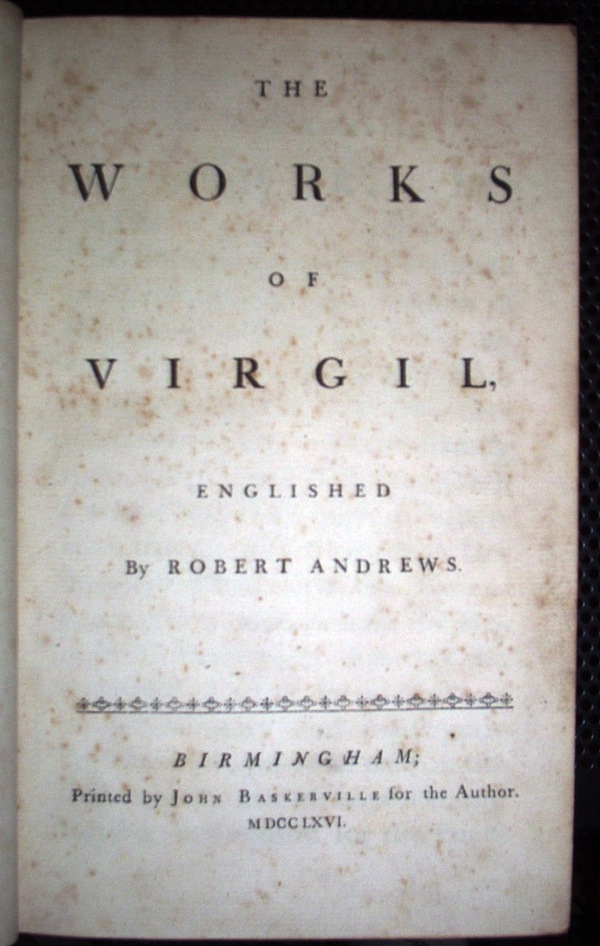
The 1766 translation of Virgil into English, by Robert Andrews

== See also ==
- William Caslon, a contemporary type-founder and printer
- Baskerville, a typeface
