= Castle Hill, Wolverley =

Coordinates: 52.4370278°N 2.2756552°W

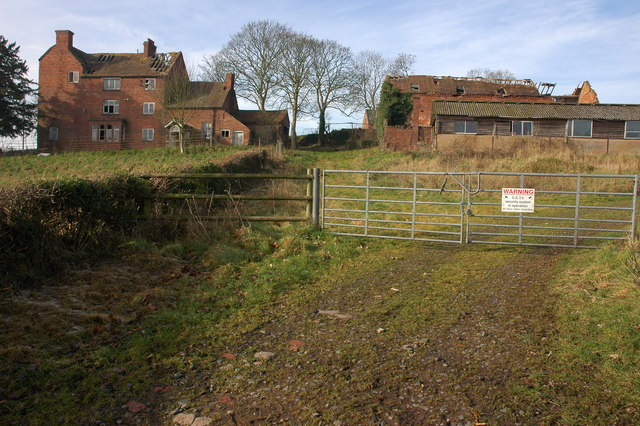
The medieval ruins lie close to the 18th-century Castle Hill Farm, Kingsford.

Castle Hill or Baron Hill is about a mile from the hamlet of Kingsford in the civil parish of Wolverley and Cookley, Worcestershire.

In 1912 the site consisted of "a small ruinous timber-framed building, used as a cowshed, mainly of 15th century date but bearing traces of earlier features. On the hillside itself is a segment of a moat encircling a third of the hill and the embankments of three communicating fishponds covering about 4 acres. The two lower ponds still contain water while the upper is used as an orchard". In 1913 it was thought to be the ruins of a castle, a possibility which D. J. Cathcart King mentions in his 1983 work Castellarium Anglicanum.

After surveying the site, Duignan (publishing in 1912) suggested that it was the remains of a late 12th century hunting lodge, but Brown, Colvin and Taylor publishing in 1963 showed that Duigan was mistaken, and the royal hunting lodge to which he referred—one in the Forest of Kinver (recorded in documents of 1195–96)—was located at Stourton Castle. However, there was another earlier royal hunting lodge at Kinver, (recorded in 1184–85) the site of which is unknown and which could have been at Castle Hill.

Inspectors from English Heritage visited the site in 1997 and although the site is very ruinous confirmed its importance and "regarded as having a high archaeological potential".
