= Kingsford, Worcestershire =

Coordinates: 52.43295°N 2.26215°W

Kingsford
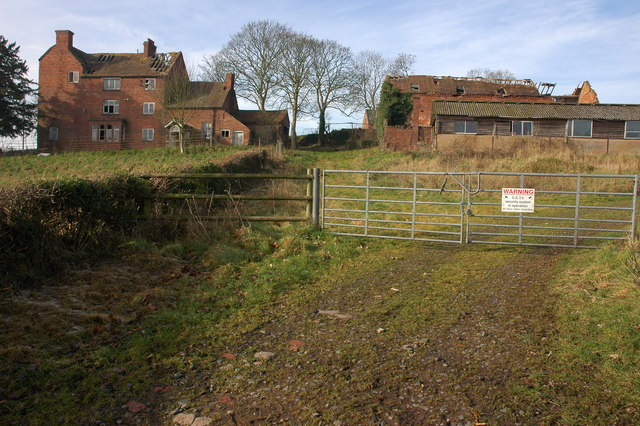
- Castle Hill Farm

- Location within Worcestershire
- OS grid reference: SO822816
- Civil parish: Wolverley and Cookley
- District: Wyre Forest
- Shire county: Worcestershire
- Region: West Midlands
- Country: England
- Sovereign state: United Kingdom
- Post town: KIDDERMINSTER
- Postcode district: DY11
- Police: West Mercia
- Fire: Hereford and Worcester
- Ambulance: West Midlands
- UK Parliament: Wyre Forest

Kingsford is a large hamlet in Worcestershire, England. It is located within the civil parish of Wolverley and Cookley, which had a population of 4,960 in 2021.

== Location ==
Kingsford is located one mile (1.6 km) north of the village of Wolverley, Worcestershire, to the north of Kidderminster. It is the northernmost settlement in the county, forming part of the border with Staffordshire and is 2 miles southwest of Kinver.

== History and amenities ==
Kingsford was a separate manor from the rest of Wolverley, and was formerly in the hundred of Halfshire, whereas the rest of the parish was in Oswaldslow.

Adjacent to Kingsford is Kingsford Country Park. The park comprises 200 acres (81 ha) and has many woodland and forest walks named after woodland birds such as the Robin Trail, Nuthatch Trail etc. The Worcestershire Way waymarked long-distance footpath passes through the park. Kinver Edge adjoins the country park on its north.
