= Drakelow Tunnels =

Underground former military complex in Worcestershire, England

Coordinates: 52.42567°N 2.26462°W

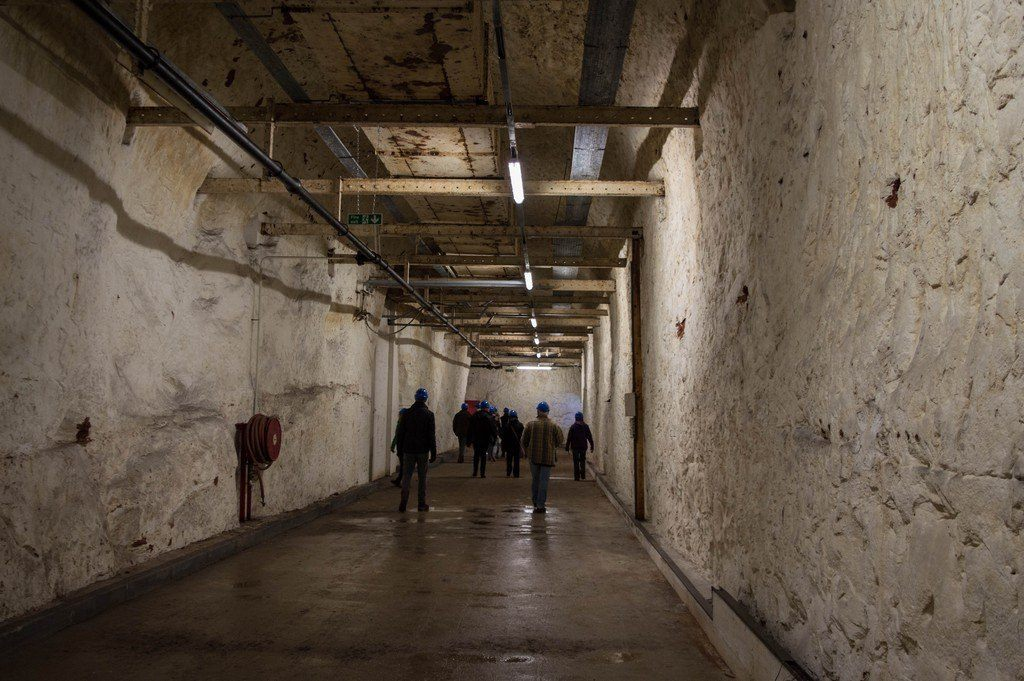
Drakelow Tunnels in 2016

Drakelow Tunnels are an underground former military complex beneath the Blakeshall Estate north of Kidderminster, Worcestershire, covering 285,000 sq ft (26,500 m^{2}), with a total length of around 3.5 miles (5.6 km). They were originally built as a Second World War shadow factory, and were developed during the Cold War to be a fall-back government centre.

== History ==
=== World War II ===
In mid-April 1941, the Ministry of Aircraft Production informed the Treasury of their intention to build an underground factory of 250,000 sq ft (23,000 m^{2}) in sandstone hills at Drakelow, Wolverley, near the village of Kinver and the town of Kidderminster, for use by "one of the engine or gun factories in the Coventry or Birmingham area". The cost of the facility was estimated at £285,000. Sir Alexander Gibb & Partners were contracted to supervise the construction, which began in June 1941 with a provisional completion date of 6 July 1942.

By early July 1942, work was well behind schedule and costs had risen to £983,000. Shortly before that date, the Rover car company was selected as the user of the factory. Rover were at the time manufacturing engines for the Bristol Aeroplane Company. It was also intended to supply components to Rover's main shadow factories at Acocks Green and Solihull, to supply spare parts, and to act as a backup facility if either of the main shadow factories was damaged by enemy action. The cost to complete was estimated at a further £184,000; Rover’s requirements included acid-resistant floors and specially painted walls in production areas.

Drakelow, originally called "Drakelow Underground Dispersal Factory", was designated Rover No. 1D factory (the D referring to 'Dispersal'). The first machine tools were installed in November 1942 and full production was achieved in May 1943. The main output was parts for Mercury and Pegasus radial engines, respectively used in aircraft such as the Bristol Blenheim and Sunderland flying boat.

The underground factory consisted of a number of tunnels laid out in a grid system. The main tunnels, numbered 1 to 4, were each 18 ft (5.5 m) wide and 16 ft (4.9 m) high. These were mainly used for access and movement of materials. Smaller cross-tunnels provided the main workshop and storage space. The area occupied by the works was approximately 54 acres with an additional 40 acres used in conjunction with construction and accommodation. The tunnels had a floor area of 284,931 sq ft (26,471.0 m^{2}), of which 85,507 sq ft (7,943.9 m^{2}) was not required by Rover and was used as an RAF stores area. There were also a number of surface buildings which included a boiler house, coal stores, electricity sub stations and a fire station.

The Mercury and Pegasus manufacturing ended in July 1945. Drakelow was retained for the storage of machine tools and work relating to development and manufacture of the Meteor tank engine until the mid-1950s.

=== Cold War ===
From the mid-1950s Drakelow Depot, as it had become, was initially used by the Ministry of Supply for storage. Around 1958 the part of the site in the area north of tunnel 4, formerly occupied by the RAF stores area, was developed by the Home Office as a regional seat of government (RSG 9.2). This was designed to cater for a staff of 325, and contained dormitories, storage areas, workshops, electrical equipment, toilets, offices, a BBC studio, a GPO Telephones communications facility and other facilities. It was publicly exposed in a demonstration held there by the West Midlands Committee of 100 in the summer of 1963.

Under later Home Defence schemes the bunker was designated a Sub-Regional Control (S-RC 91) in July 1963, Sub-Regional Headquarters (SRHQ 9.2) in the 1970s and finally a Regional Government Headquarters (RGHQ 9.2) in 1982. For this last role, the site was greatly modernised in the early 1980s, although only around half of earlier RSG facility was designated for use by a reduced staff of 134. New blast doors were fitted in place of the previous wooden factory doors and the interior of the site was refurbished in the areas forward of tunnel 4.

=== Post Cold War ===
In about 1990 there was a plan to move the RGHQ to a much smaller bunker, formerly used by UKWMO, at Lawford Heath near Rugby. In the end this never happened, and the Drakelow site was decommissioned and sold in around 1993.

=== Redevelopment ===
Following the complex's move into private hands there were plans to redevelop the Drakelow site into a residential and commercial park. The plans met with local opposition and a Preservation Trust was quickly established by residents and other interested parties to fight the planned redevelopment.

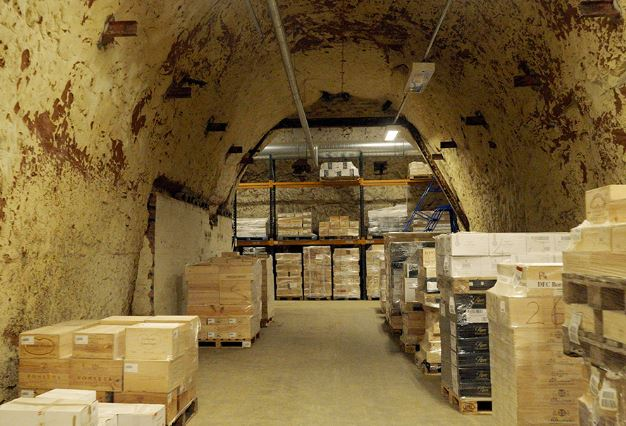
Wine Storage in 2024

In May 2019, London City Bond submitted plans to develop the tunnels into a warehouse and distribution centre for 10,000 tonnes of wine creating 40 full time jobs, with part of the tunnels renovated to museum standard. The plans were rejected by Wyre Forest District Council in September 2019, but following an appeal hearing in November 2020, planning permission for the redevelopment was granted in January 2021.

The volunteers at Drakelow Tunnels Museum provides visitors with a background to the history of the site and has exhibits showing what the site was used for in its various uses during the 1940s - 1990s. The museum offers guided tours where bookings can be made online via eventbrite.

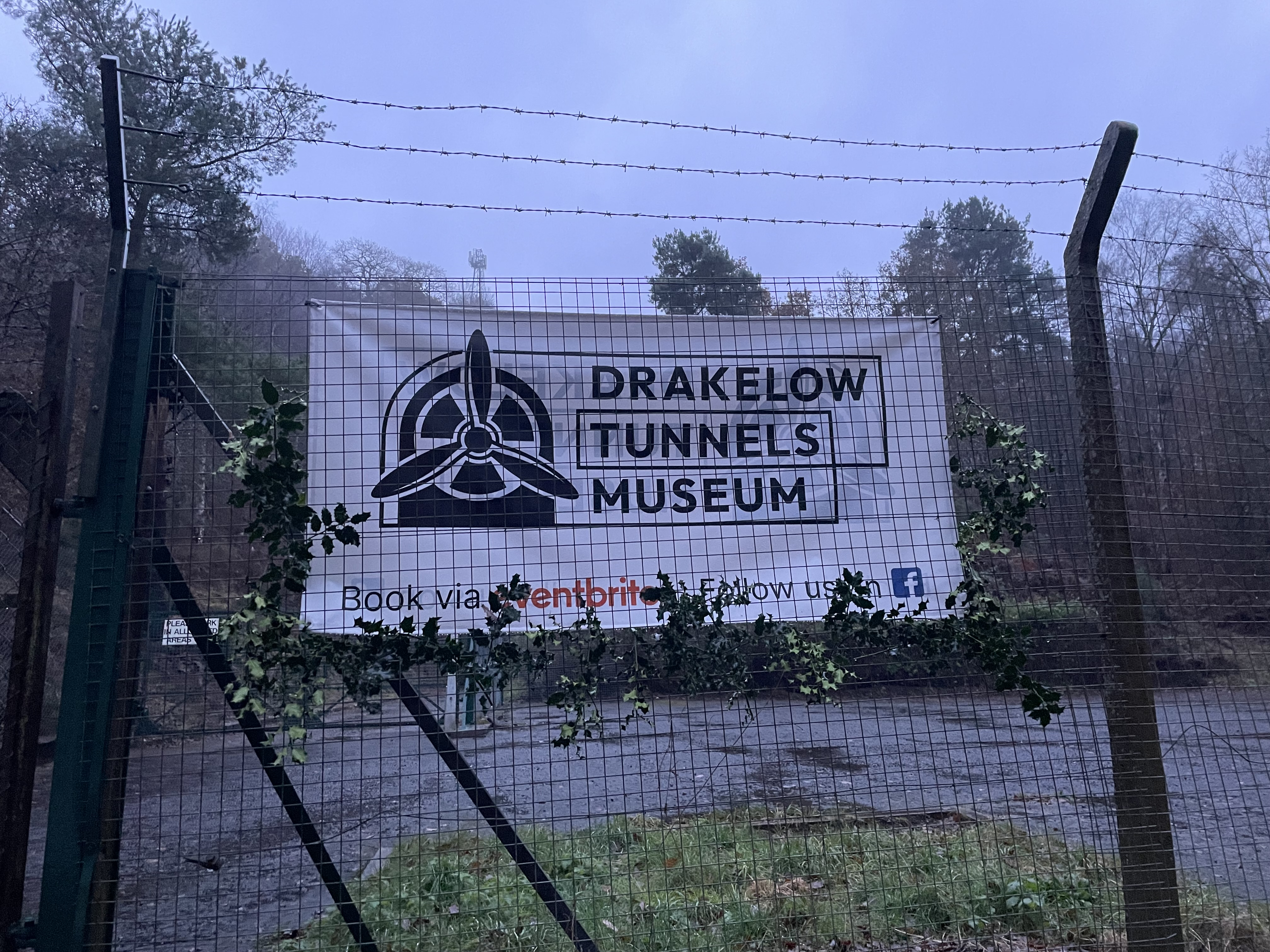
Drakelow Tunnels Museum as of 2023

To follow the ongoing restoration of the museum, you can find them on Facebook by searching ‘Drakelow Tunnels Museum’.

=== Reputed hauntings ===
The tunnels are reputedly one of the most haunted places in Britain. In 2019, paranormal investigators from American television series Paranormal Lockdown visited the tunnels; the resulting investigations became an episode of the show's third season.
