= Cookley =

Village in Worcestershire, England

Coordinates: 52.41776°N 2.23668°W

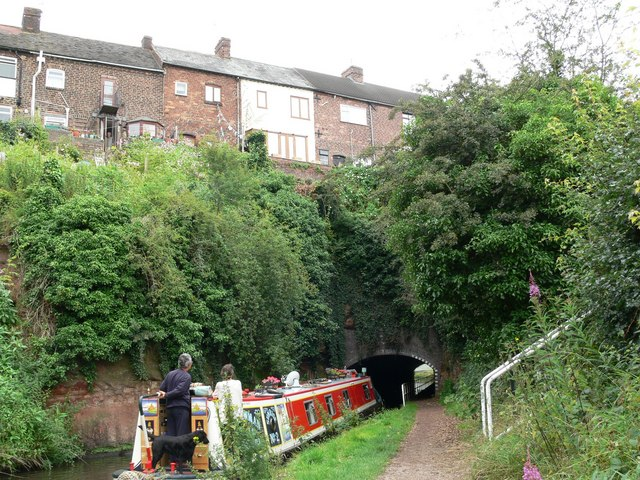
- Eastern portal of Cookley Tunnel

- Location within Worcestershire
- Population: 1,971 (2021)
- OS grid reference: SO8480
- Civil parish: Wolverley and Cookley
- District: Wyre Forest
- Shire county: Worcestershire
- Region: West Midlands
- Country: England
- Sovereign state: United Kingdom
- Post town: KIDDERMINSTER
- Postcode district: DY11
- Police: West Mercia
- Fire: Hereford and Worcester
- Ambulance: West Midlands
- UK Parliament: Wyre Forest

Cookley is a village in the Wyre Forest District of Worcestershire, England, a few miles to the north of Kidderminster. Also, a few miles south-west of Stourton, Staffordshire and is close to the villages of Kinver and Wolverley. It lies on the River Stour, and the Staffordshire and Worcestershire Canal in the civil parish of Wolverley and Cookley. At the time of the 2021 census, its built-up area had a population of 1,971.

Commerce within the village include a Florist, a cafe, an Indian take away, a fish and chip shop and a village shop; all of which are family-run. It also has a Tesco Express and two Public Houses.

The Village Hall is large and very well used by many different groups and clubs. It is situated alongside Cookley Playing Fields. The village has very active junior/senior Football and Cricket clubs.

== History ==
=== Saxon estate ===
The name Cookley was originally Culnan Clif, a place for which there is a Saxon charter with a boundary clause covering a substantial part of the northern part of the parish of Wolverley and Cookley. The medieval village of Cookley lay on the opposite side of river Stour to the present village, next to Caunsall. It gave its name to Cookley Wood, a former common, also known as Blakeshall Common. Blakeshall was thus also part of the Saxon estate. The estate was granted by William I to Worcester Cathedral Priory, which already owned the adjoining estate of Wolverley. From that time, the two were administered together as the manor of Wolverley. Nevertheless, the Domesday Book extent of Wolverley can be explained in terms of the preceding Saxon estate of Wolverley only.

=== Cookley Forge ===
The present village of Cookley developed near Cookley Forge, a water-powered finery forge on the river, just west of the bridge. The forge was initially a slitting mill established in about 1639, replacing a corn mill. The forge was probably added in the 1670s, and was one of the works of the Foley family's "Ironworks in Partnership" in the 1690s.

The forge passed before 1725 to the Knight family and remained in their hands until it closed in the late 19th century. Operations at the forge seem to have been expanded in the early 19th century, tinplate production being added. In this period, the Knight family concentrated their operations around Cookley Forge, disposing of or closing other works. This works became the main employer in the area. It prospered in the canal era. With the Staffordshire and Worcestershire canal, running beside the works and a canal arm leading into them, the canal was the main transport artery for the works. However, later in the 19th century, in the railway era, the works were at a competitive disadvantage, because there was no connection to a railway. Ultimately, the works at Cookley were closed and relocated to the Cookley Works at Brockmoor near Brierley Hill in 1886. The site of the forge has remained in industrial use, at one period being occupied by Steel Stampings Ltd.

The present village began with houses built by the Knight family for their workers and the division of fields along Castle Road into house plots, starting in the 1810s with Portway Piece in Austcliffe.
