= Wolverley =

Village in Worcestershire, England

Coordinates: 52.41325°N 2.24401°W

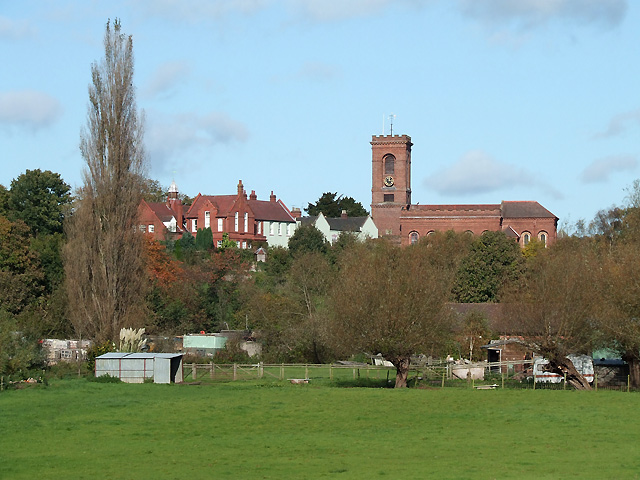
- Wolverley village

- Location within Worcestershire
- Population: 1,210 (2021)
- OS grid reference: SO835795
- District: Wyre Forest
- Shire county: Worcestershire
- Region: West Midlands
- Country: England
- Sovereign state: United Kingdom
- Post town: Kidderminster
- Postcode district: DY10, DY11
- Dialling code: 01562
- Police: West Mercia
- Fire: Hereford and Worcester
- Ambulance: West Midlands
- UK Parliament: Wyre Forest

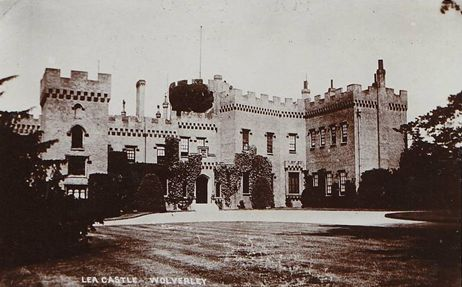
Lea Castle, Wolverley, postcard photograph c.1900. Built after 1809 by John Knight I, ironmaster. Sold by his son John Knight II (1765–1850) in about 1818 to finance his purchase of Exmoor Forest, Somerset. Demolished c.1945 except for the gatehouse, which still stands. A series of watercolours c.1816 of the interiors of Lea Castle, attributed to the painter John Carter (1748–1817), is held by the Metropolitan Museum of Art, New York, Elisha Whittelsey Collection, no. 56.601(4).

Wolverley is a village; with nearby Cookley (1 mi northeast), it forms a civil parish in the Wyre Forest District of Worcestershire, England. It is 2 miles north of Kidderminster and lies on the River Stour and the Staffordshire and Worcestershire Canal. At the time of the 2021 census, its built-up area had a population of 1,210. The village has also been known as "Overley" at various times.

== Notable features ==
There are 13 Listed Buildings within Wolverley, three of which are grade II*.

One of the unusual features of the area are rooms cut into the sandstone cliffs behind some of the houses. In the centre of the village, next to the Queen's Head Public House car-park are some caves which reflect this usage.

Bodenham Arboretum is a 170 acre woodland site located in Wolverley.

Wolverley has one of the few remaining animal pounds in the area.

=== St. John's Church ===
Woverley's Church of England and parish church is dedicated to St. John. It is claimed as a tradition that there has been a church or chapel on the site since Anglo-Saxon times. The first documented evidence of a church was the mention of a parish priest in the village in the Domesday Book (1086). A church on the site of the current parish church site has been in deanery of Kidderminster since the 13th Century. The current building was consecrated on 20 September 1772, and belongs to the Church of England. The current clergyman with responsibility is The Revd Shaun Armstrong.

== History ==
The name Wolverley derives from the Old English Wulfweardlēah meaning 'Wulfweard's wood/clearing'.

Wolverley was recorded in the Domesday Book of 1086 under an ancient spelling of Ulwardelie.

The Worcester Member of Parliament John Atte Wode is recorded as holding land at Wolverley prior to 1357.

=== The Legend of the Swan ===
According to ancient legend a crusading member of the Attwood family was rescued from a dungeon and returned to his home Wolverley Court by a swan.

=== William Sebright ===
Wolverley was the birthplace of William Sebright, who as a Town Clerk of London accumulated an estate in Bethnal Green, which he left in his will of 1620 for the foundation of a grammar school in Wolverley. The site of the original Wolverley Grammar School is still in the centre of the village: the grammar school changed its name to Sebright School in 1931 when it moved to a new site. The new school was opened by Bewdley-born Stanley Baldwin. Between 1948 and 1970 Sebright was a public school, and from 1965 to 1969 the sculptor Fritz Steller was the Head of Art. Sebright School closed in 1970 and reopened as Wolverley High School, now called Wolverley C E Secondary School, a state run secondary school. However, the junior wing, Heathfield Knoll School, continued in existence and now includes pupils up to 16. Over the years the endowment left by William Sebright has grown to millions of pounds, and the original scope of the educational foundation he set up has been broadened to include grants to local schools, and to former pupils of those schools.

=== Tinplate Industry ===
Wolverley Lower Mill, which was established in 1670 by Philip Foley and Joshua Newborough, helped the village play a key role in the early tinplate industry.

=== Baskerville the printer ===
The village was also the birthplace of John Baskerville, the celebrated printer (1706–1775).

=== Wolverley Camp ===
During the Second World War the US Army Medical Corps opened its award-winning 52nd general hospital at Wolverley Camp.

== Gallery ==
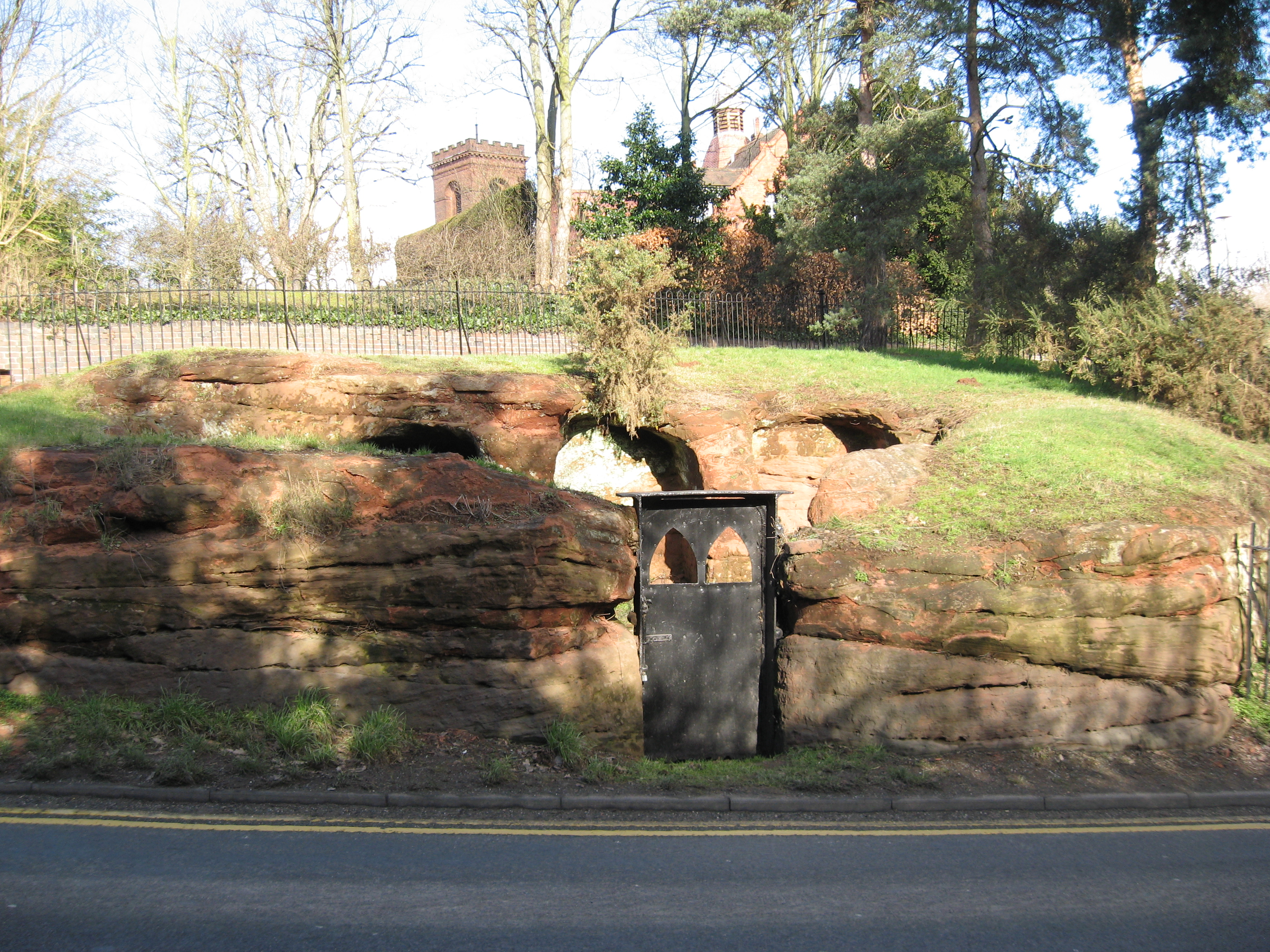
The sign next to the entrance says "Wolverley Pound, formerly used for impounding animals found straying until ransomed by their owners".

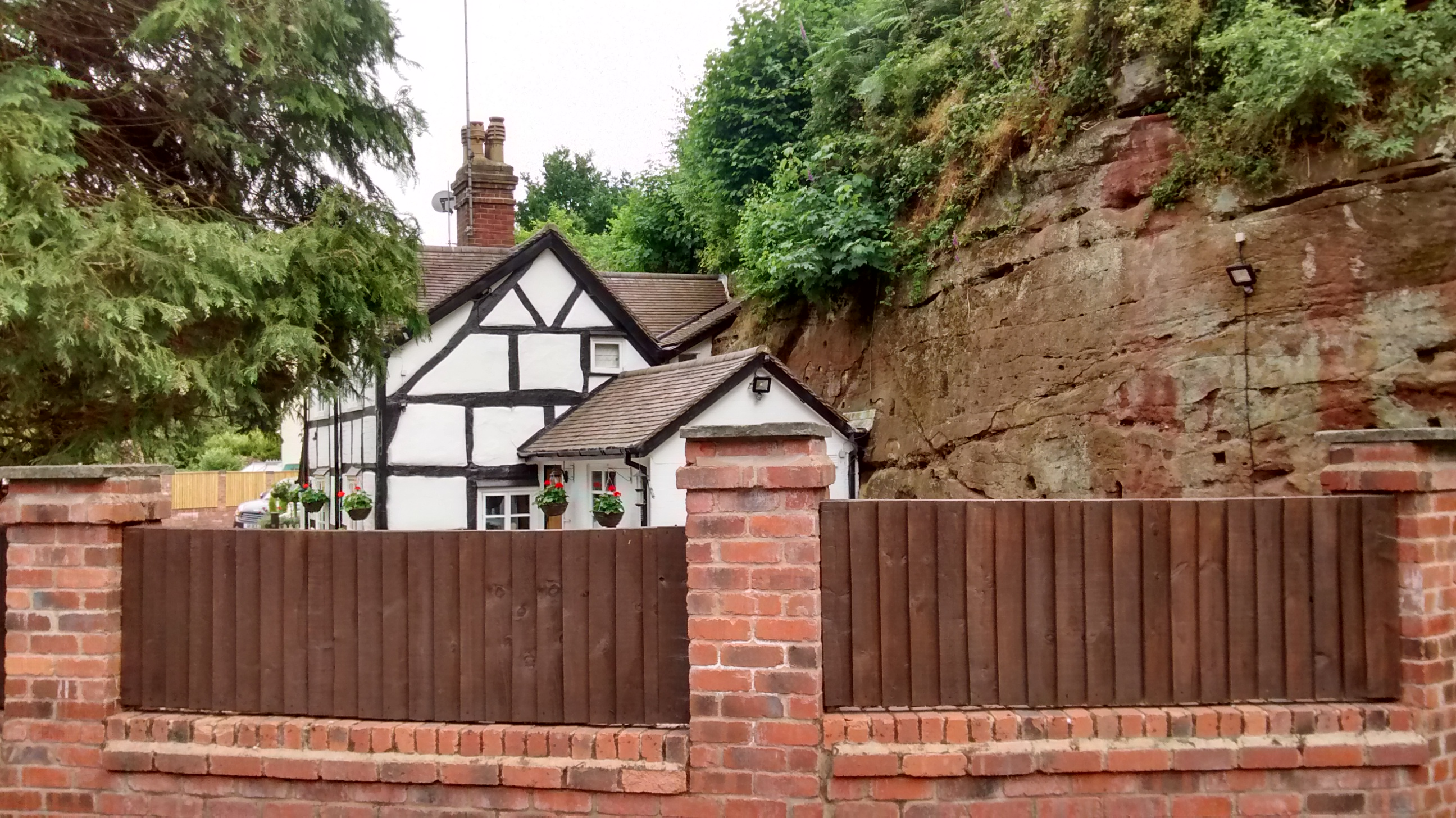
A half-timbered cottage on The Cottages road in Wolverley that has back rooms built into the sandstone cliff.

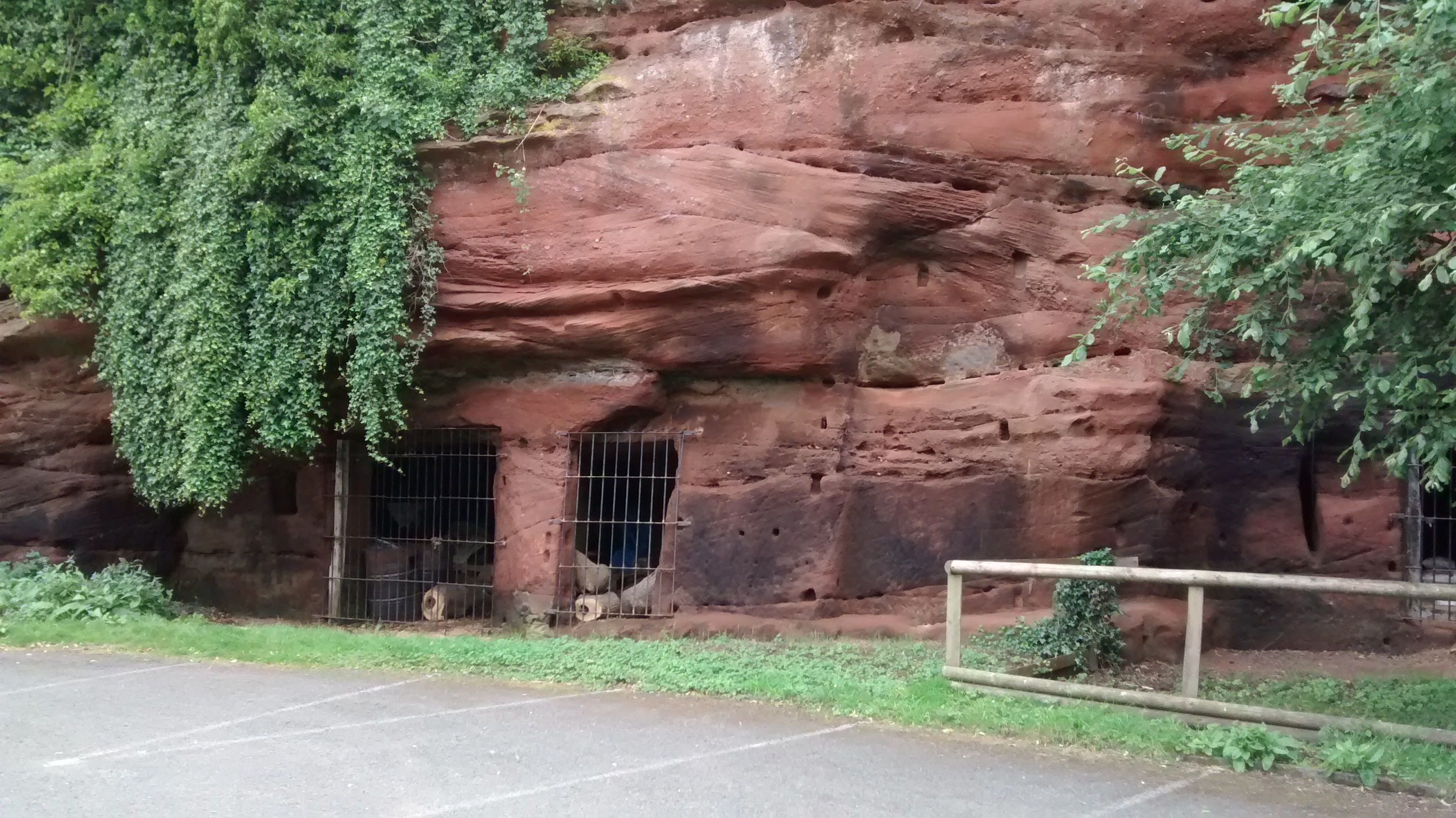
Entrances to man made caves at the back of the Queen's Head car park in Wolverley

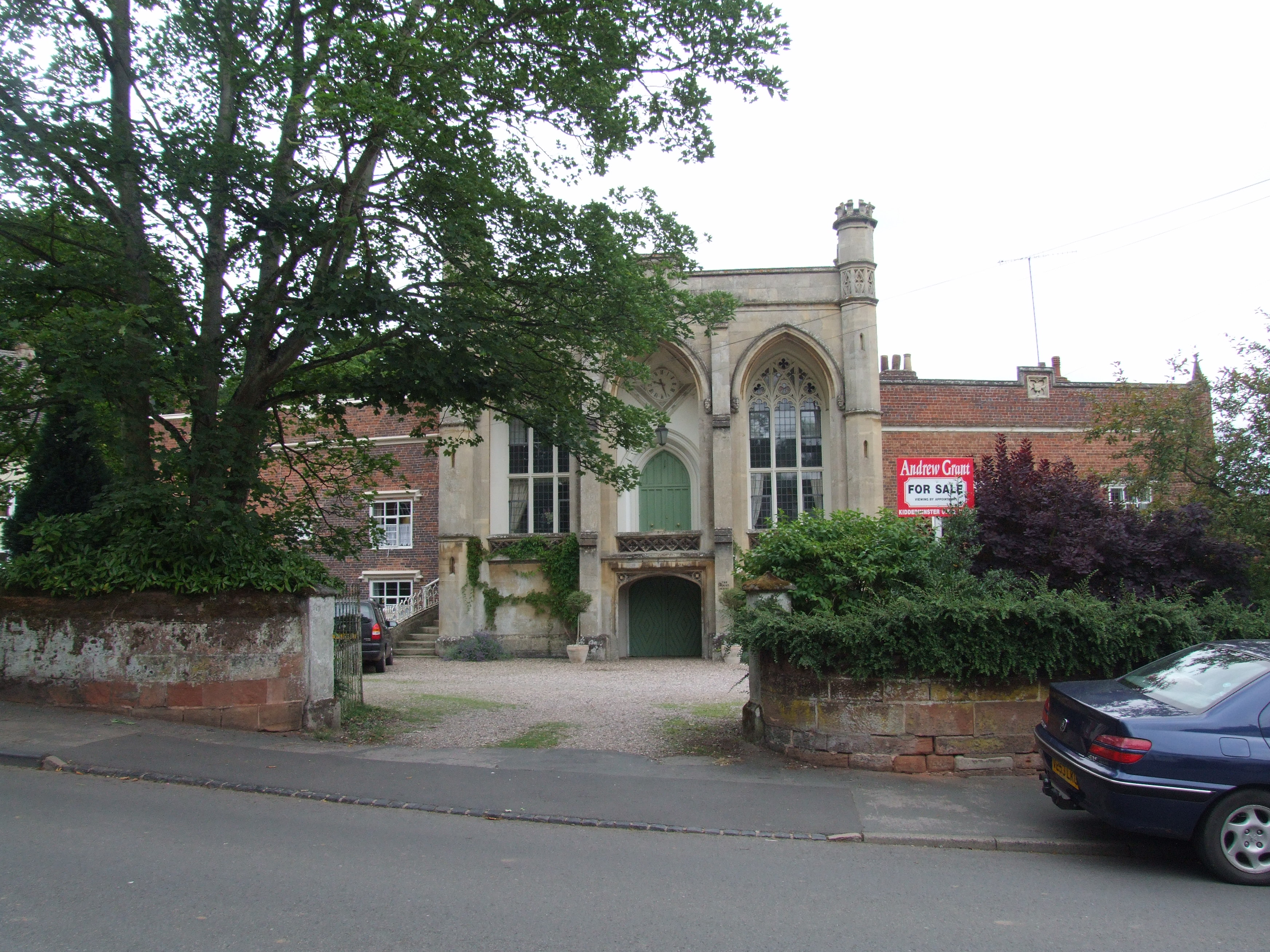
The Court House a private residence.

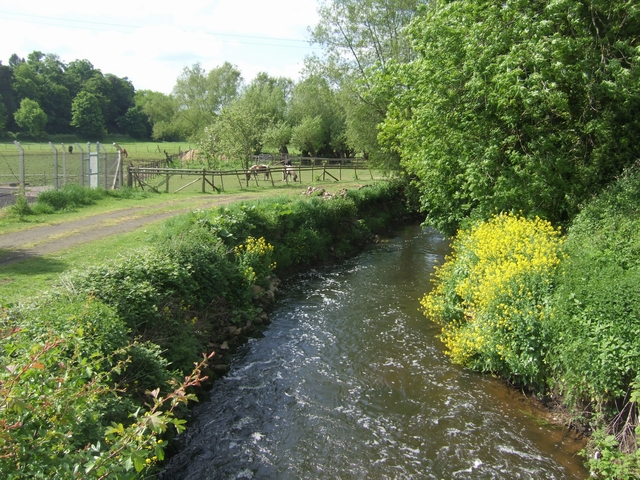
The Stour downstream of Wolverley Bridge.

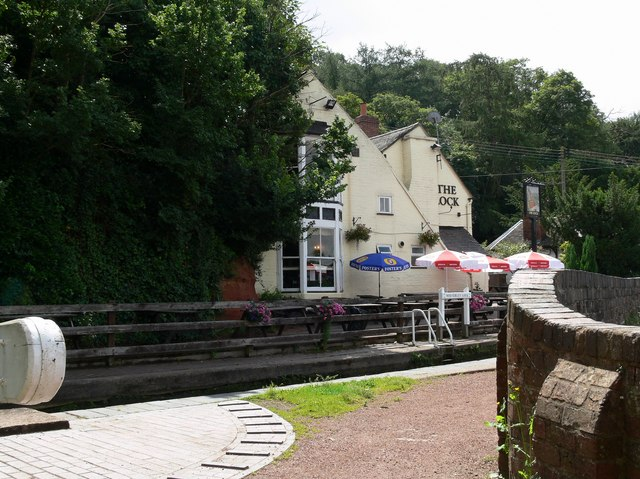
The Lock pub next to Wolverly Lock on the Staffordshire and Worcestershire Canal

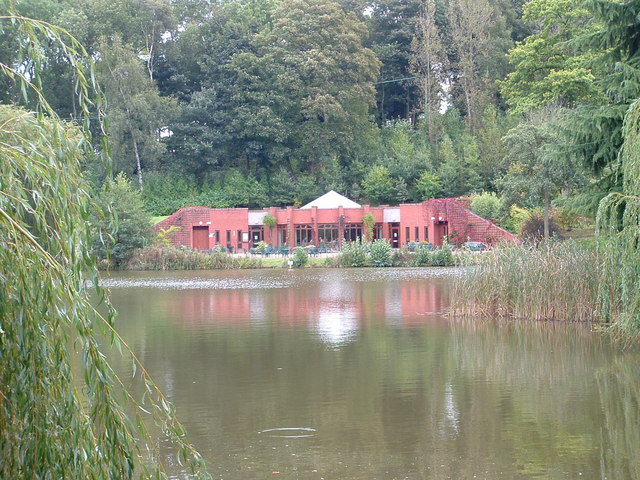
Bodenham Arboretum

== See also ==
- Castle Hill, Wolverley, the site of medieval ruins.
- Drakelow Hillfort, a small multivallate Iron Age hillfort, located on a promontory (known as Drakelow Hill)
- Richard Baxter Monument, was built around 1850 in memory of Richard Baxter (1615–1691), a Kidderminster-based English Puritan church leader, poet and hymn-writer. The monument is a Grade II listed structure and stands on a hilltop on Blakeshall Common.
- Sebright Baronets
