= Sabrina Way =

Long-distance footpath and bridleway in England

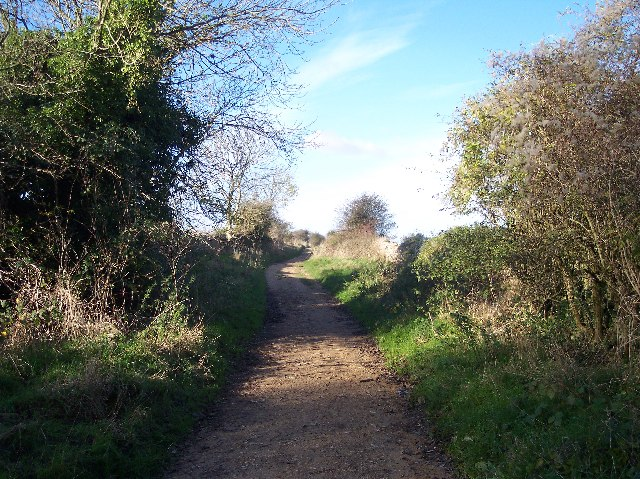
- Sabrina Way crossing Nottingham Hill
- Length: 203 mi (327 km)
- Location: Gloucestershire; Derbyshire; Staffordshire; Worcestershire; Wiltshire; Oxfordshire
- Designation: Long-distance trail
- Trailheads: Great Barrington, Gloucestershire; Hartington, Derbyshire
- Use: Hiking; Horse riding
- Highest point: 391 m (1,283 ft)
- Difficulty: Challenging
- Season: All year

The Sabrina Way is a waymarked long-distance footpath and bridleway in England.

== Development ==
The Sabrina Way was developed by Brenda Wickham for the British Horse Society and local partner authorities, and was created in 2000. It is named after Sabrina, river goddess of the Severn.

== Distance ==
It runs for 203 mi or 327 km.

== The route ==
The route is primarily designed and intended for horses and riders and links bridleways between the Pennines and the Cotswolds and The Ridgeway.

It runs north–south between Hartington in the Derbyshire Peak District and Great Barrington.

It passes from Derbyshire where it leaves the Pennine Bridleway (and bridleway networks that run north to Cumbria) through Staffordshire heading south through Weston Park and the Wyre Forest in Worcestershire to enter Gloucestershire, Wiltshire and Oxfordshire.

It does encompass some tarmac road riding but is mainly on bridleways and paths.

== Connecting trails ==
The Sabrina Way links with the Claude Duval Bridleroute, Cotswold Way, Diamond Way (North Cotswold), Geopark Way, Gloucestershire Way, Jack Mytton Way, Macmillan Way (Boston to Abbotsbury), Manifold Way, Millennium Way, Monarch's Way, Pennine Bridleway, Severn Way, Staffordshire Moorlands Challenge Walk, Staffordshire Way, Teme Valley Way, Three Rivers Ride, Tissington Trail, Two Saints Way, White Peak Rollercoaster, Windrush Way and the Worcestershire Way.
