= Geopark Way =

Long-distance footpath in England

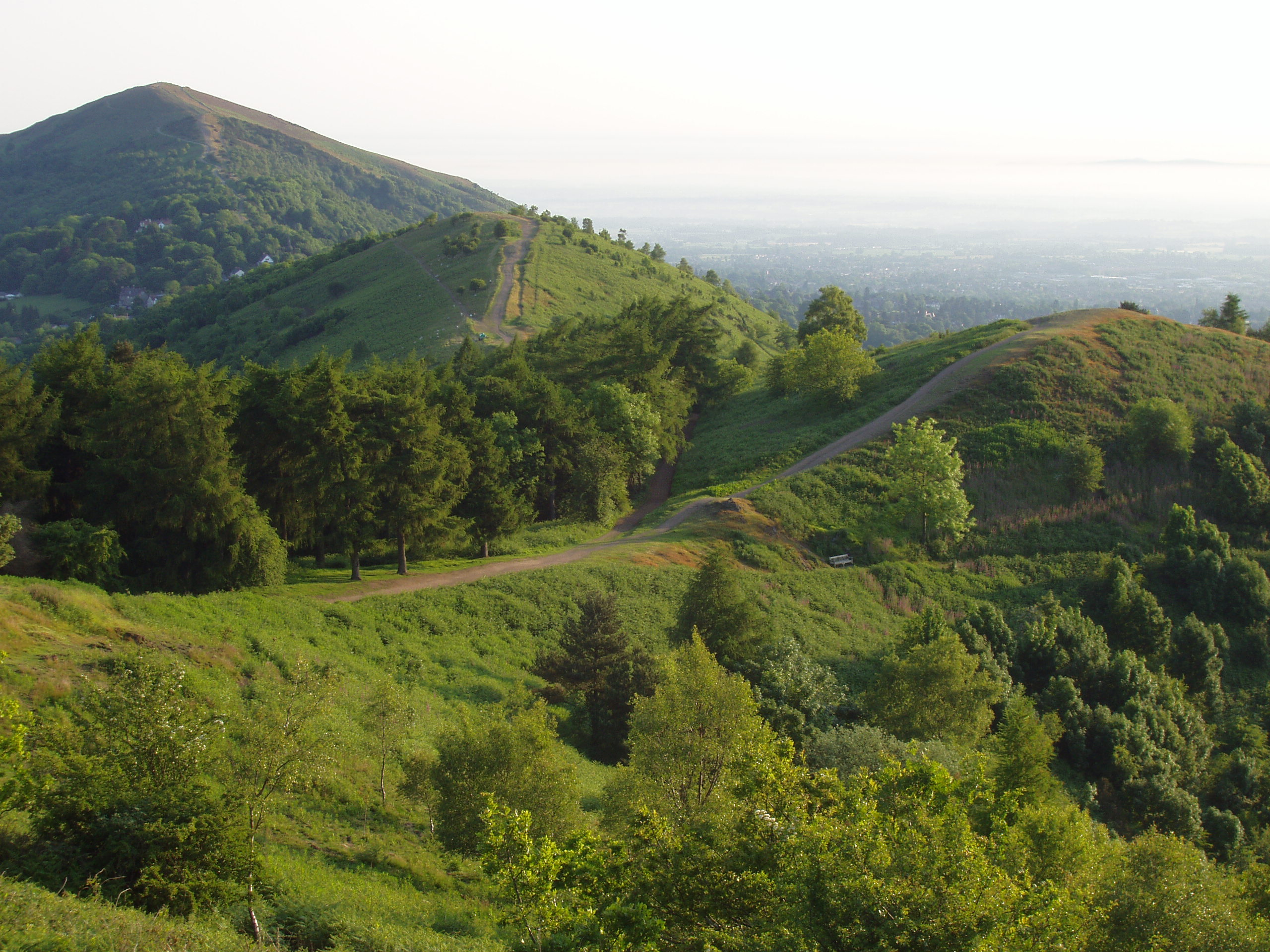
- The Malvern Hills
- Length: 109 mi (175 km)
- Location: Shropshire, Worcestershire, Herefordshire, Gloucestershire, England
- Designation: Long-distance trail
- Trailheads: Bridgnorth; Gloucester
- Use: Hiking
- Difficulty: Challenging
- Season: All year

The Geopark Way is a waymarked long-distance trail located within the counties of Shropshire, Worcestershire, Herefordshire and Gloucestershire, England. It runs 109 miles (175 km) from Bridgnorth to Gloucester.

== Connecting trails ==
The Geopark Way links with the Worcestershire Way, Glevum Way, Gloucestershire Way, Herefordshire Trail, Jack Mytton Way, Sabrina Way, Severn Way, Shropshire Way, Three Choirs Way and the Wysis Way.

== See also ==
- Long-distance footpaths in the United Kingdom
