= End Hill =

Hill in the Malvern Hills, Worcestershire, England

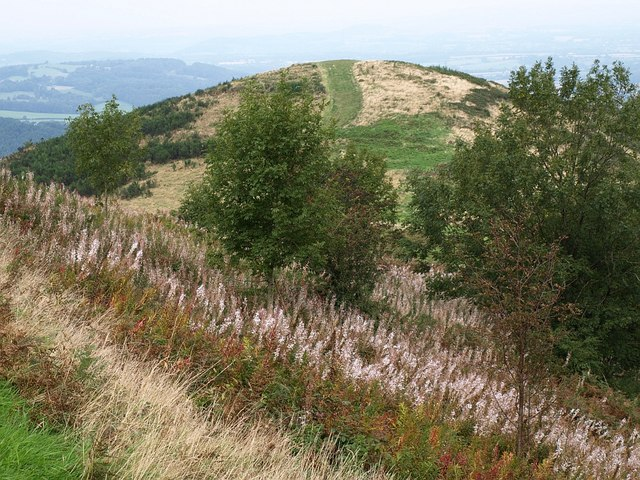
- End Hill

Highest point
- Elevation: 329 m (1,079 ft)
- Coordinates: 52°07′10.42″N 2°20′29.64″W

Geography
- Location: Malvern Hills, England
- Topo map: OS Landranger 150

Geology
- Rock age: Pre-Cambrian
- Mountain type(s): Igneous, Metamorphic

Climbing
- Easiest route: Hiking

End Hill is the northernmost top of the Malvern Hills that runs approximately 13 kilometres (8 mi) north-south along the Herefordshire-Worcestershire border. It lies north of Table Hill and north-northwest of North Hill. It has an elevation of 329 metres (1,079 ft).
