= Shakespeare's Avon Way =

Long-distance footpath in the Midlands of England

Shakespeare's Avon Way waymarker

Shakespeare's Avon Way is a waymarked long-distance footpath through the Midlands of England, United Kingdom.

== The route ==
The 148 kilometres (92 miles) waymarked route (established in 2008) follows the River Avon runs from its source at Naseby in Northamptonshire to its confluence with the River Severn at Tewkesbury in Gloucestershire, with six proposed separate sections. One reviewer suggests that it represents approximately 32 hours staged walking of moderate difficulty. By way of contrast the fastest recorded completion of the route is claimed as of 2026 to be just under one day and ten hours.

The path is intended to be a companion to the Shakespeare's Way, which was created to offer a possible route taken by playwright William Shakespeare when journeying between London, where he acted and wrote his plays, and his birthplace in Stratford-upon-Avon. The latter is the location common to both walks. It also shares parts its routing with the following long distance pathways: Centenary Way, Coventry Way, Millennium Way (England), Wychavon Way, Grand Union Canal Walk, Oxford Canal Walk, Monarch's Way, Heart of England Way, Severn Way and Gloucestershire Way.

The route passes through the counties of Northamptonshire, Warwickshire, Worcestershire and Gloucestershire and visits the following places:

- Naseby
- Lilbourne
- Bretford
- Bubbenhall
- Leamington Spa
- Warwick
- Stratford upon Avon
- Welford-on-Avon
- Bidford-on-Avon
- Offenham
- Evesham
- Pershore
- Great Comberton
- Tewkesbury
