= Coventry Way =

Footpath in central England

Coordinates: 52.4358°N 1.6314°W

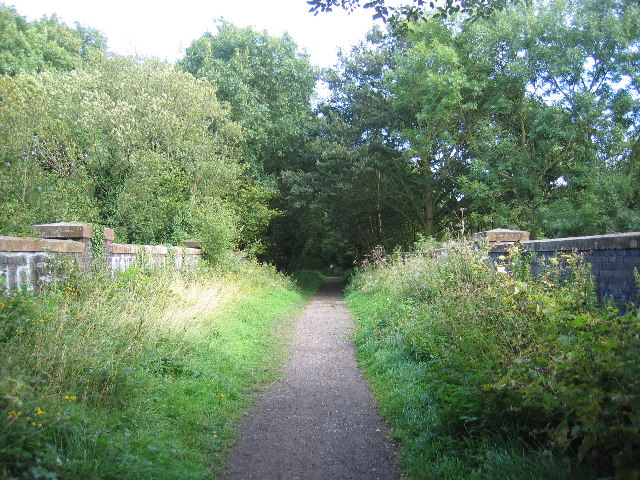
- A section of the Coventry Way path in Kenilworth
- Length: 40 miles (64 km)
- Location: Coventry
- Trailheads: Meriden
- Use: hiking trail
- Elevation gain/loss: 560 metres (1,840 ft)
- Website: Official website

The Coventry Way is a 40-mile (64 km) long-distance footpath in central England that starts and finishes in Meriden. It forms a circular route around the city of Coventry covering countryside in both the West Midlands and Warwickshire. The path is managed by A Coventry Way Association.

== Route ==
As a circular path, the Coventry Way can be started and finished at any point and walked in either direction, but for the purposes of the annual challenge event it starts at finishes at the Queen's Head public house in Meriden and proceeds anticlockwise. From the Queen's Head it passes through the churchyard of St Lawrence and then south through the Meriden Gap towards Berkswell, following the Heart of England Way for part of the route; the two paths diverge near Berkswell, with the Heart of England Way continuing southwest towards Balsall Common and the Coventry Way southeast. It joins the Berkswell to Kenilworth Greenway (the route of the former railway line) at Carol Green, passes to the east of Burton Green and follows the Greenway to its end in Kenilworth (8 miles/13 km from Meriden).

At Kenilworth the Coventry Way joins the Centenary Way, the two routes leave the town via its golf course and cross the A46 to Stoneleigh (10 miles/16 km). They pass the church of St Mary the Virgin in Stoneleigh, cross the River Sowe close to its confluence with the Avon, then cross the Avon itself before reaching the hamlet of Stareton (12 miles/19 km), where they turn east towards Bubbenhall (14 miles/23 km), from where Shakespeare's Avon Way follows the same route as the other two paths - although in the opposite direction, since the latter is usually walked from the source of the Avon to its mouth.

From Bubbenhall the three paths follow the same route northeast to Ryton-on-Dunsmore (17 miles/27 km), cross under the A45 and continue to Wolston (19 miles/31 km), where they diverge: the Centenary Way goes directly north to Brandon, while the Coventry Way and Shakespeare's Avon Way head northeast, under the Coventry to Rugby railway line to Bretford (20 miles/32 km). Here they too separate: Shakespeare's Avon Way follows the path of the river east towards Church Lawford, while the Coventry Way heads north to Brinklow (23 miles/37 km). It traverses the motte and bailey (the site of Brinklow Castle) and passes the church of St John the Baptist.

North of Brinklow, the Coventry Way crosses Smite Brook and reaches the Oxford Canal at Grimes Bridge, where it also crosses the Centenary Way. It continues northwest along the towpath of the canal, passing under the M6, leaves the canal at Hopsford Aqueduct, and passes Ansty Golf Course to reach Ansty village (27 miles/43 km). After leaving Ansty, the path briefly rejoins the Oxford Canal before leaving it again as it passes under the M69. The path follows the M69 for a short distance before turning northwest, passing through the grounds of Barnacle Hall and into Barnacle village (28 miles/45 km). From Barnacle it continues west, crosses the Coventry Canal at Bedworth Hill Bridge and passes under the Coventry to Nuneaton railway line to arrive in Bedworth (30 miles/48 km).

The Coventry Way passes through housing estates in the western area of Bedworth, leaving the town close to the former site of Newdigate Colliery; it then heads towards Fillongley, but turns southwest before reaching it, arriving instead at Corley Ash (35 miles/56 km). From there it crosses a bridge over the M6 and traverses the small boggy area of Corley Moor to reach the village of the same name (37 miles/60 km).

Beyond Corley Moor, the route passes through Birchley Hays Wood, where it rejoins the Heart of England Way. Both paths continue southwest through Meriden Shafts, emerging at Eaves Green (39 miles/63 km). The last part of the Coventry Way is on roads, under the A45 and back to Meriden, where it finishes at the Queen's Head (40 miles/64 km).

== Coventry Way and HS2 ==
The proposed route of the HS2 rail line would coincide with the route of the Coventry Way between Carol Green and Burton Green. A Coventry Way Association has therefore voiced strong opposition to the plans.

== See also ==
- Long-distance footpaths in the UK
