= North Worcestershire Path =

37-mile footpath in Worcestershire, England

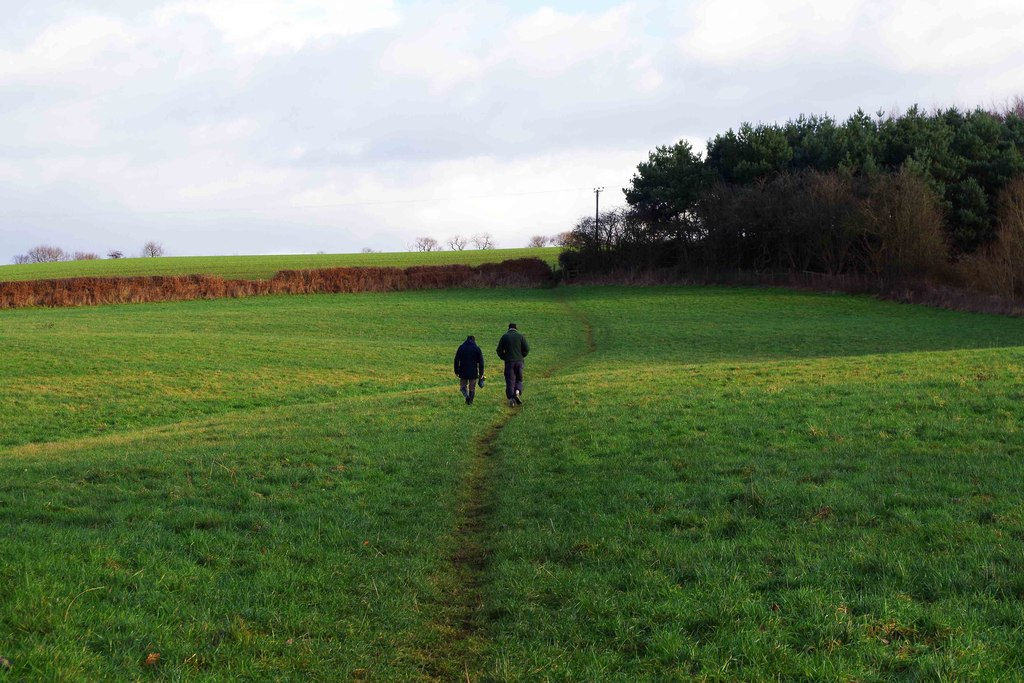
- Walkers on the North Worcestershire path near Caunsall, Worcestershire
- Length: 37 mi (60 km)
- Location: Worcestershire, England
- Trailheads: Bewdley; Major's Green
- Use: Hiking
- Elevation change: 4,180 feet (1,270 m)
- Highest point: 994 feet (303 m)

The North Worcestershire Path is a waymarked long-distance trail within the historic county of Worcestershire in England. It runs 37 miles (60 km) from Bewdley to Major's Green, Birmingham.

== The route ==
The North Worcestershire Path begins at the Georgian town of Bewdley, also the starting point for the Worcestershire Way. Running north along the River Severn to Eymore Wood near to the Trimpley Reservoirs, the route then heads east to Kingsford Country Park and Kinver Edge near the Staffordshire Way, before continuing east towards the Clent Hills. From the Clent Hills the route goes south to the densely wooded Lickey Hills, where it winds up through Scots Pine and native woodland past a visitor's centre. From the Lickey Hills the route winds roughly northeast, finishing in Major's Green.
