= Sugarloaf Hill, Malvern =

Sugarloaf Hill
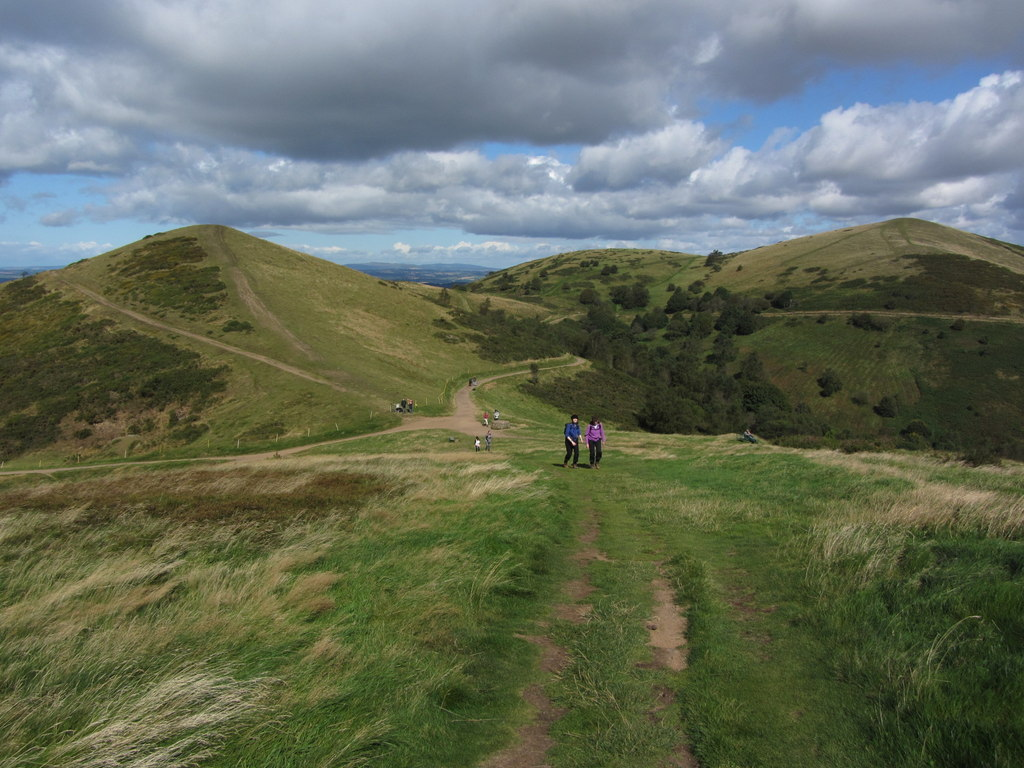
- Sugarloaf Hill (left) with Table Hill and North Hill

Highest point
- Elevation: 368 m (1,207 ft)
- Prominence: 10m (33ft)
- Parent peak: Table Hill
- Coordinates: 52.1099°N 2.3416°W

Geography
- Location: Malvern Hills, England
- Topo map: OS Landranger 150

Geology
- Rock age: Pre-Cambrian
- Mountain type(s): Igneous, Metamorphic

Climbing
- Easiest route: Hiking

Sugarloaf Hill lies between the Worcestershire Beacon and North Hill in the Malvern Hills, which run north-south along the Herefordshire-Worcestershire border for about 13 kilometres (8 mi).

The summit of Sugarloaf Hill is 368 metres (1,207 ft) above sea level and is a popular peak usually passed by walkers hiking between the Worcestershire Beacon and North Hill—respectively the highest and second highest Malvern summits.
