= Severn Way =

224-mile footpath in Wales and England

Coordinates: 52°35′7″N 2°26′6″W

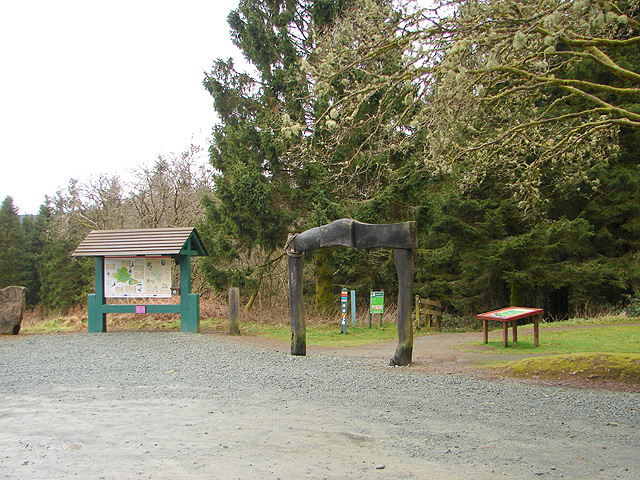
- Start of the Severn Way path at the source of the Severn
- Length: 224 mi (360 km)
- Designation: Long-distance trail
- Trailheads: Plynlimon; Bristol
- Use: Hiking
- Highest point: Plynlimon, 752 m (2,467 ft)
- Season: All year

The Severn Way is a waymarked long-distance footpath in the United Kingdom, which follows the course of the River Severn through Mid Wales and western England.

According to the Long Distance Walkers Association the Severn Way is 224 miles (360 km) long.

== The route ==
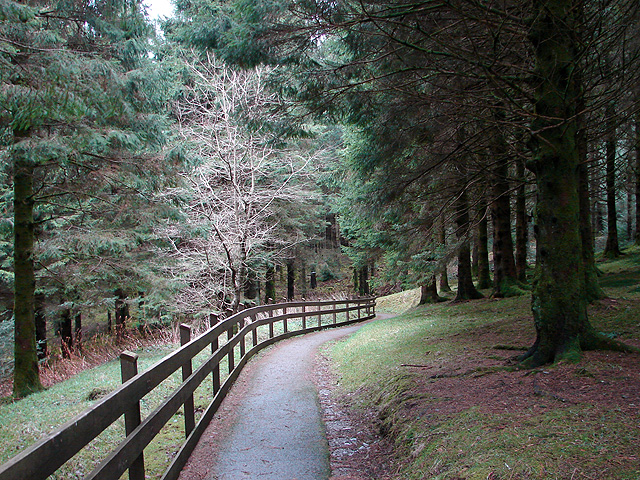
The start of the Severn Way path, near Rhyd-y-benwch

The source of the River Severn is high on Plynlimon, in the uplands of mid Wales, from where both river and walk descend to Llanidloes, Newtown, Powys and Welshpool. It then follows the towpath of the Montgomeryshire Canal, passing through Shrewsbury, Shropshire and the Severn Gorge. It passes the cradle of the Industrial Revolution at Ironbridge before passing through Bridgnorth, Hampton Loade and Highley (in Shropshire), and Bewdley in Worcestershire, Stourport-on-Severn, Worcester, Upton-upon-Severn and Tewkesbury. It enters Gloucestershire and passes through Gloucester itself before passing Berkeley Castle and following the Severn Estuary past Slimbridge. Originally, the path finished at Severn Beach, but it has recently been extended to Bristol via Lawrence Weston, Shirehampton and through the Avon Gorge.

== Connecting trails ==
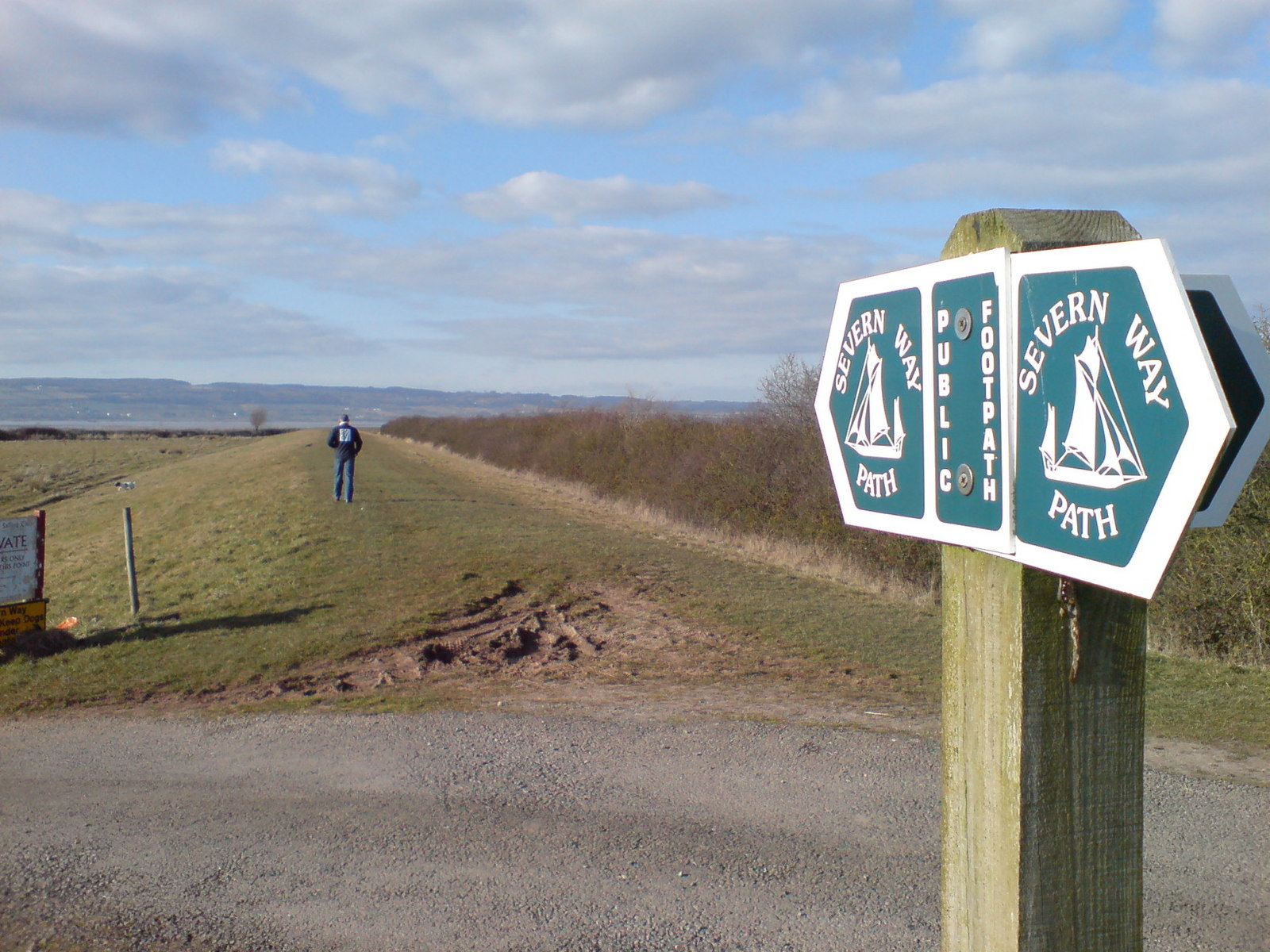
Severn Way at Oldbury-on-Severn

The River Avon Trail is part of the Kennet and Avon Walk which goes cross country from Reading on the Thames to the Severn Estuary. The Severn Way includes Gloucestershire Way, Wye Valley Walk, Worcestershire Way, Staffordshire and Worcestershire Canal Walk, Worcester & Birmingham Canal Walk, Three Choirs Way and Telford and Wrekin Walks, and Shakespeare's Avon Way.

== See also ==
- Long-distance footpaths in the United Kingdom
- List of crossings of the River Severn
- Severn bore
