= Cave dweller =

Human being who inhabits a cave

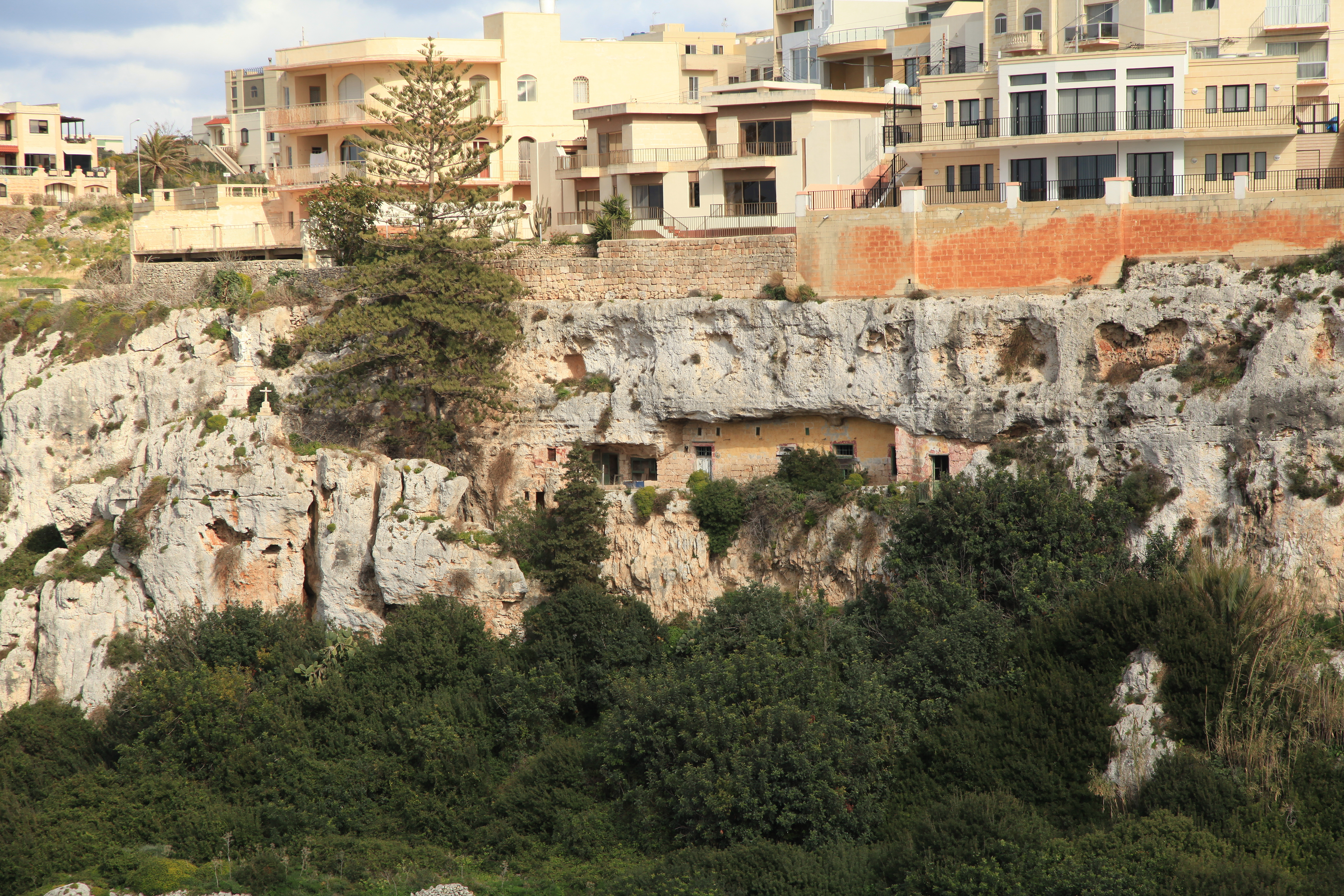
Cave dwellings in Mellieħa, Malta

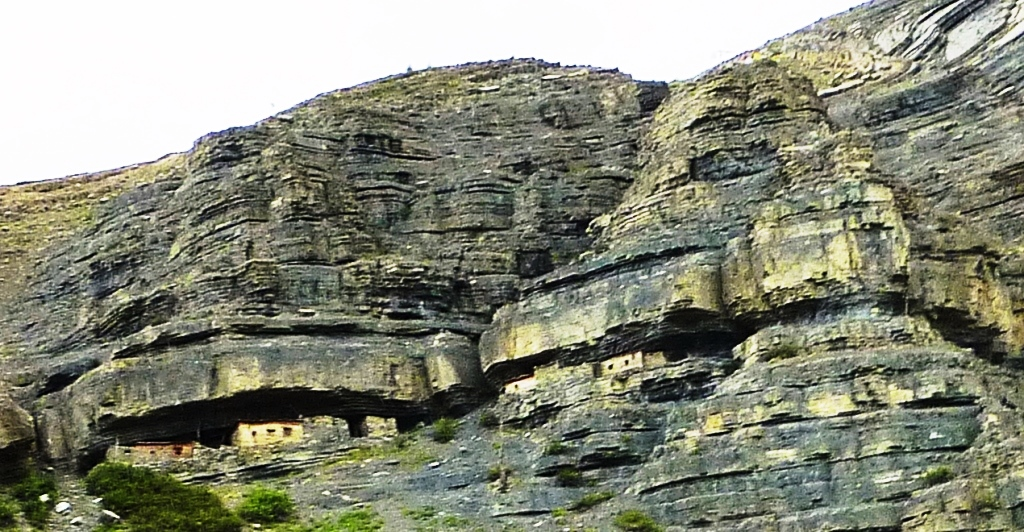
Cave dwellings, Spiti, India

A cave dweller, or troglodyte, is a human who inhabits a cave or the area beneath the overhanging rocks of a cliff.

== Prehistory ==
Some prehistoric humans were cave dwellers, but most were not (see Homo and Human evolution). Such early cave dwellers, and other prehistoric peoples, are also called cave men (the term also refers to the stereotypical "caveman" stock character type from fiction and popular culture). Despite the name, only a small portion of humanity has ever dwelt in caves: caves are rare across most of the world; most caves are dark, cold, and damp; and other cave inhabitants, such as bears and cave bears, cave lions, and cave hyenas, often made caves inhospitable for people.

The Grotte du Vallonnet, a cave in the French Riviera, was used by people approximately one million years ago. Although stone tools and the remains of eaten animals have been found in the cave, there is no indication that people dwelt in it.

Since about 750,000 years ago, the Zhoukoudian cave system, in Beijing, China, has been inhabited by various species of human being, including Peking Man (Homo erectus pekinensis) and modern humans (Homo sapiens).

Starting about 170,000 years ago, some Homo sapiens lived in some cave systems in what is now South Africa, such as Pinnacle Point and Diepkloof Rock Shelter. The stable temperatures of caves provided a cool habitat in summers and a warm, dry shelter in the winter. Remains of grass bedding have been found in nearby Border Cave.

About 100,000 years ago, some Neanderthals dwelt in caves in Europe and western Asia. Caves there also were inhabited by some Cro-Magnons, from about 35,000 years ago until about 8000 B.C. Both species built shelters, including tents, at the mouths of caves and used the caves’ dark interiors for ceremonies. The Cro-Magnon people also made representational paintings on cave walls.

Also about 100,000 years ago, some Homo sapiens worked in Blombos Cave, in what became South Africa. They made the earliest paint workshop now known, but apparently did not dwell in the caves.

== Ancient and premodern examples ==
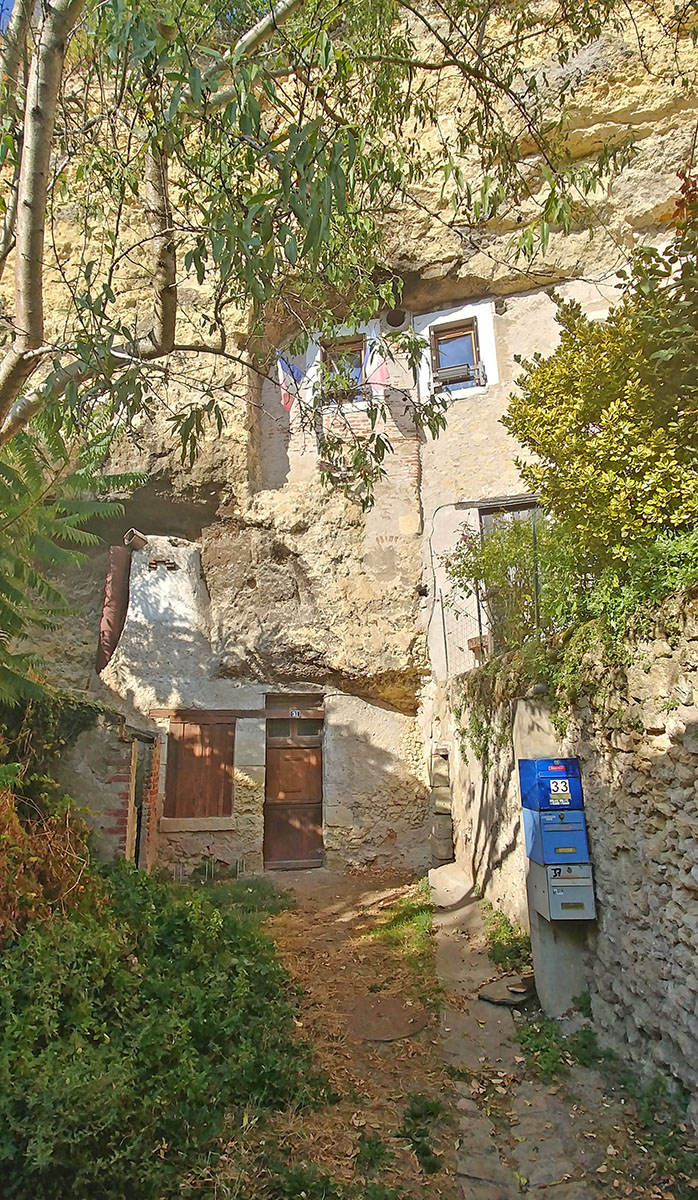
Cave dwellings in Amboise, Loire Valley, France

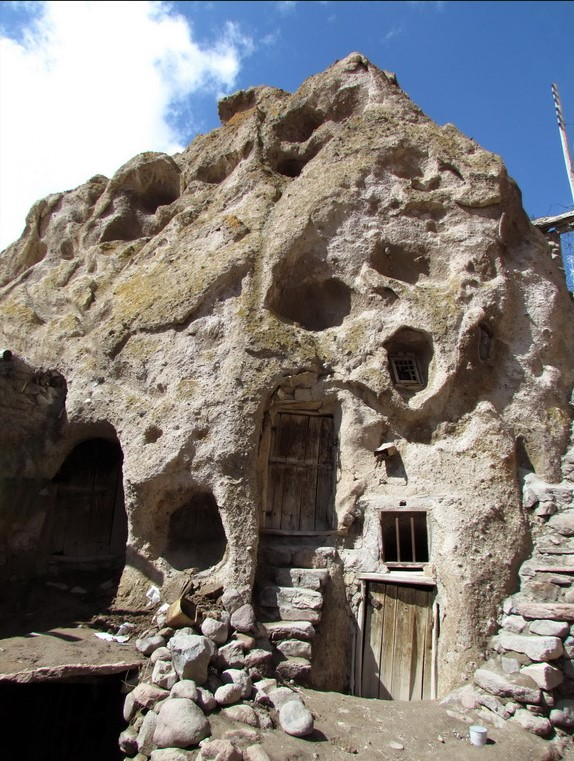
Kandovan village, Iran

Especially during war and other times of strife, small groups of people have lived temporarily in caves, where they have hidden or otherwise sought refuge. They also have used caves for clandestine and other special purposes while living elsewhere.

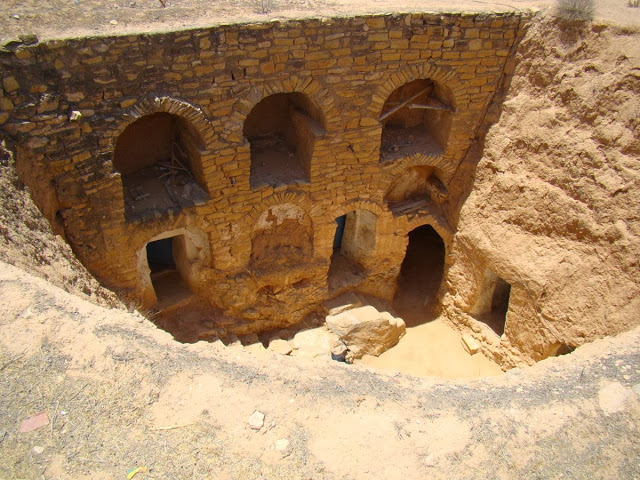
Cave dwelling in Matmata, Tunisia

Writers of the classical Greek and Roman period made several allusions to cave-dwelling tribes in different parts of the world, such as the Troglodytae.

Perhaps fleeing the violence of Ancient Romans, people left the Dead Sea Scrolls in eleven caves near Qumran, in what is now an area of the West Bank managed by Qumran National Park, presently occupied by Israel. The documents remained undisturbed there for about 2,000 years, until their discovery in the 1940s and 1950s.

From about 1000 to about 1300, some Pueblo people lived in villages that they built beneath cliffs in what is now the Southwestern United States.

The DeSoto Caverns, in what became Alabama in the United States, were a burial ground for local tribes; the same caves became a violent speakeasy in the 1920s. The Caves of St. Louis may have been a hiding-place along the Underground Railroad.

== Modern examples ==
=== Asia ===
In the 1970s, several members of the Tasaday apparently inhabited caves near Cotabato, in the Philippines.

In Hirbet Tawani, near Yatta Village, in the Southern Hebron Hills, in an area contested by the Palestinian Authority and Israel, there are Palestinians living in caves. People also inhabited caves there during the time of the Ottoman Empire and British rule. In recent years some have been evicted by the Israeli government and settlers.

At least 30,000,000 people in China live in cave homes, called yaodongs; because they are warm in the winter and cool in the summer, some people find caves more desirable than concrete homes in the city.

In Cappadocia in modern day Turkey several underground cities built by the Phrygians in the 8th-7th century BC, expanded in the Byzantine Empire era, have been in use by local inhabitants until the 20th century. They provided shelter in times of wars and persecutions. Cities like Derinkuyu and Kaymakli, which were connected with each other by 8-9km tunnels, could house up to 20.000 people each, whereas the younger Byzantine built Özkonak could house up to 60.000 people for up to 3 months. In 2019, unexpected flooding in the small settlement of Çalış, north of Avanos town, led to the discovery of an approximately 5,000-year-old three-story underground town referred to as “Gir-Gör” (Enter and See) by locals. The five-kilometre-long "city" contained homes, tunnels, and places of worship. A small human figurine was discovered inside the site. According to the locals, the site was considered a source of healing water and was called “Caesar’s bath". It is not currently open to the public.

=== Australia ===
In the Australian desert mining towns of Coober Pedy and Lightning Ridge, many families have carved homes into the underground opal mines, to escape the heat.

=== Europe ===
In Greece, some Christian hermits and saints are known by the epithet "cave dweller" (Greek: Σπηλαιώτης, romanized: Spileótis) since they lived in cave dwellings; examples include Joseph the Cave Dweller (also known as Joseph the Hesychast) and Arsenios the Cave Dweller.

In England, the rock houses at Kinver Edge were inhabited until the middle of the 20th century.

Caves at Sacromonte, near Granada, Spain, are home to about 3,000 Gitano people, whose dwellings range from single rooms to caves of nearly 200 rooms, along with churches, schools, and stores in the caves. From 2021–2023 Beatriz Flamini spent 500 days alone in a cave in Granada in an experiment on the effects of social isolation.

Some families have built modern homes in caves, and renovated old ones, as in Matera, Italy and Spain. In the Loire Valley, abandoned caves are being privately renovated as affordable housing.

=== North America ===
In her book Home Life in Colonial Days, Alice Morse Earle wrote of some of the first European settlers in New England, New York, and Pennsylvania living in cave dwellings, also known as "smoaky homes":

In Pennsylvania caves were used by newcomers as homes for a long time, certainly half a century. They generally were formed by digging into the ground about four feet in depth on the banks or low cliffs near the river front. The walls were then built up of sods or earth laid on poles or brush; thus half only of the chamber was really under ground. If dug into a side hill, the earth formed at least two walls. The roofs were layers of tree limbs covered over with sod, or bark, or rushes and bark. The chimneys were laid of cobblestone or sticks of wood mortared with clay and grass. The settlers were thankful even for these poor shelters, and declared that they found them comfortable. By 1685 many families were still living in caves in Pennsylvania, for the Governor's Council then ordered the caves to be destroyed and filled in.

In 2003, a Missouri family renovated and moved into a 15,000 square feet (1,400 m^{2}) sandstone cave.

== See also ==
- Caveman
- Cave monastery
- Cave painting
- Cave-dwelling Jews
