= Kinver Edge =

Heath and woodland on the border of Staffordshire and Worcestershire, England

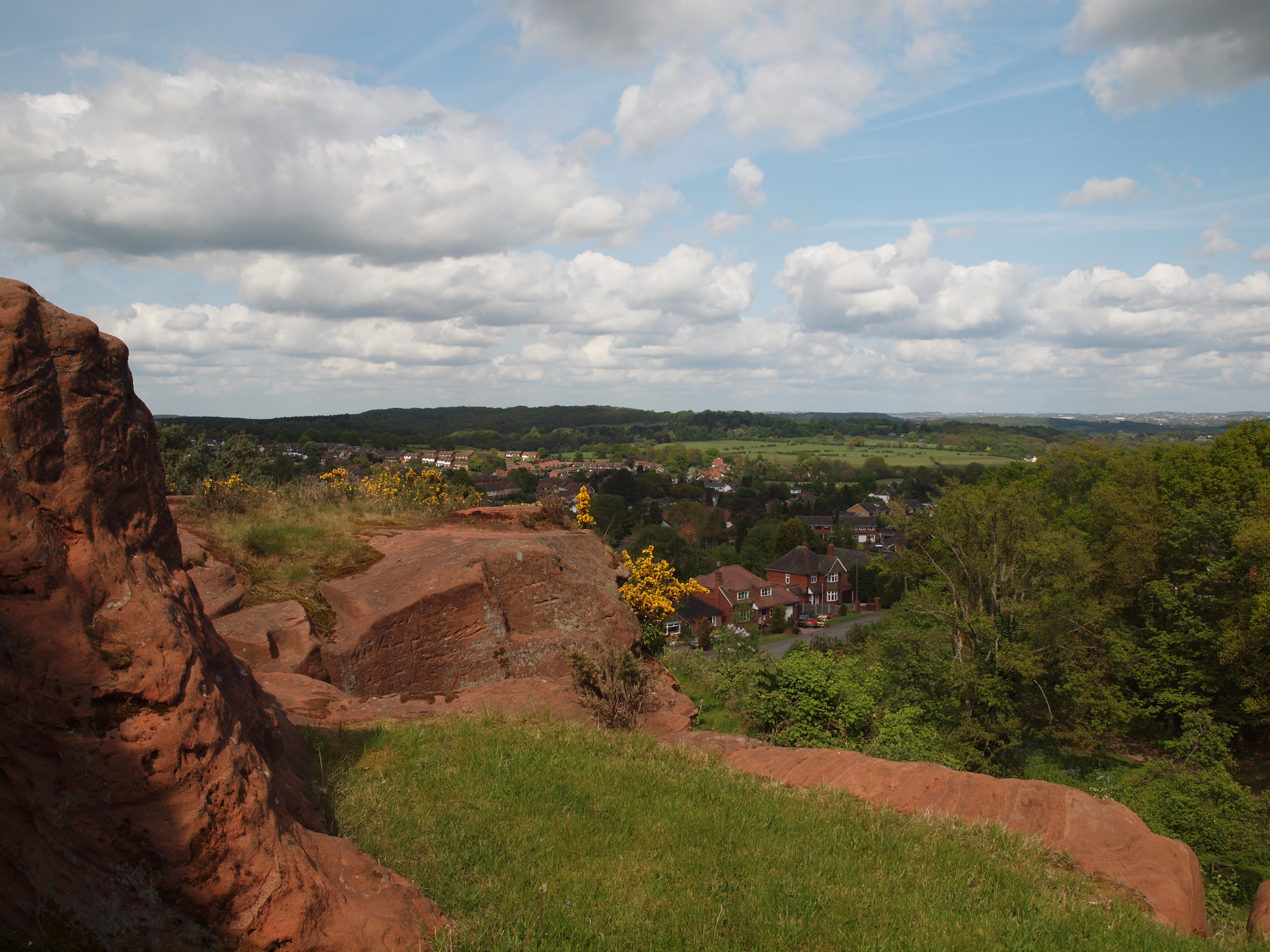
- Kinver as seen from Holy Austin Rock Houses

Highest point
- Elevation: 164 m (538 ft)
- Listing: None
- Coordinates: 52°27′00″N 2°14′34″W

Geography
- Location within Staffordshire
- Location: Staffordshire, England
- OS grid: SO829824
- Topo map: OS Landranger 102

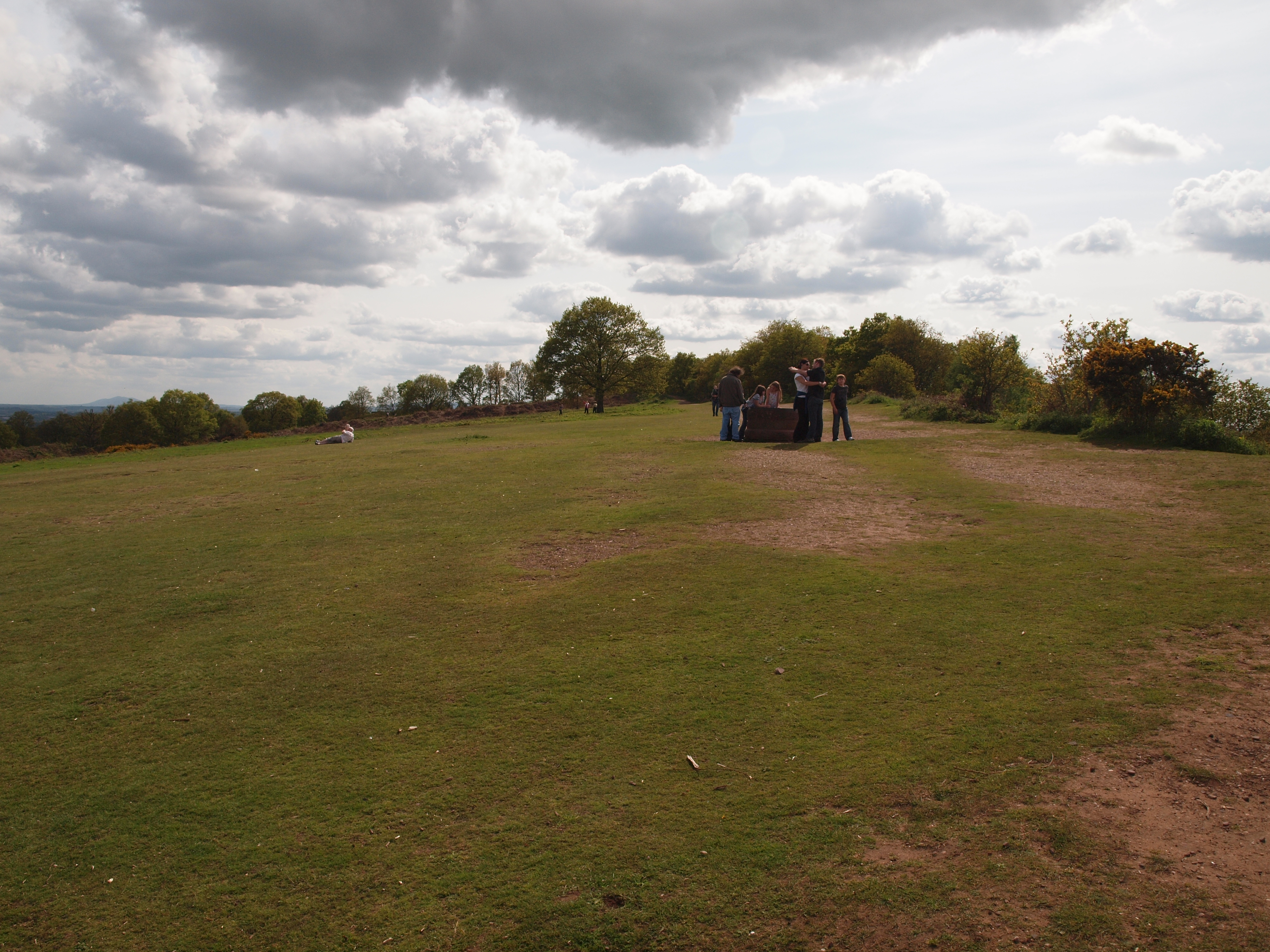
Summit of Kinver Edge

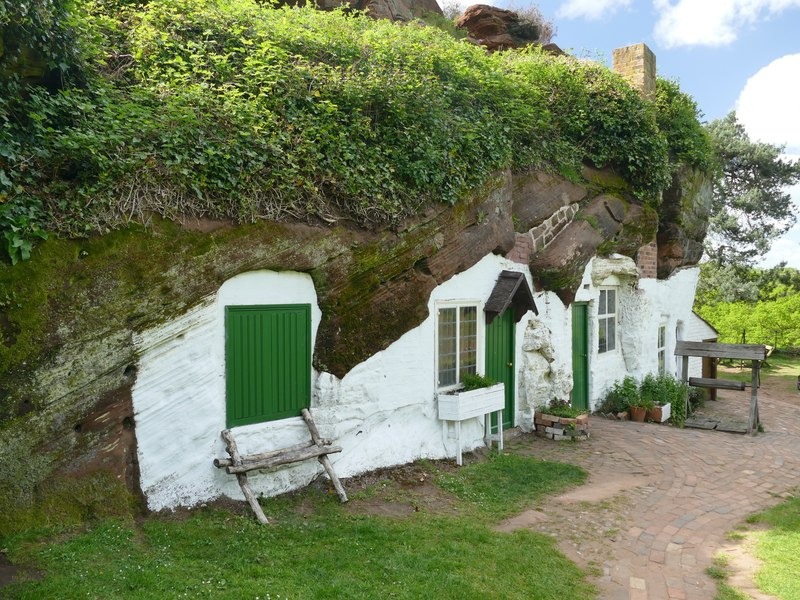
Holy Austin rock houses

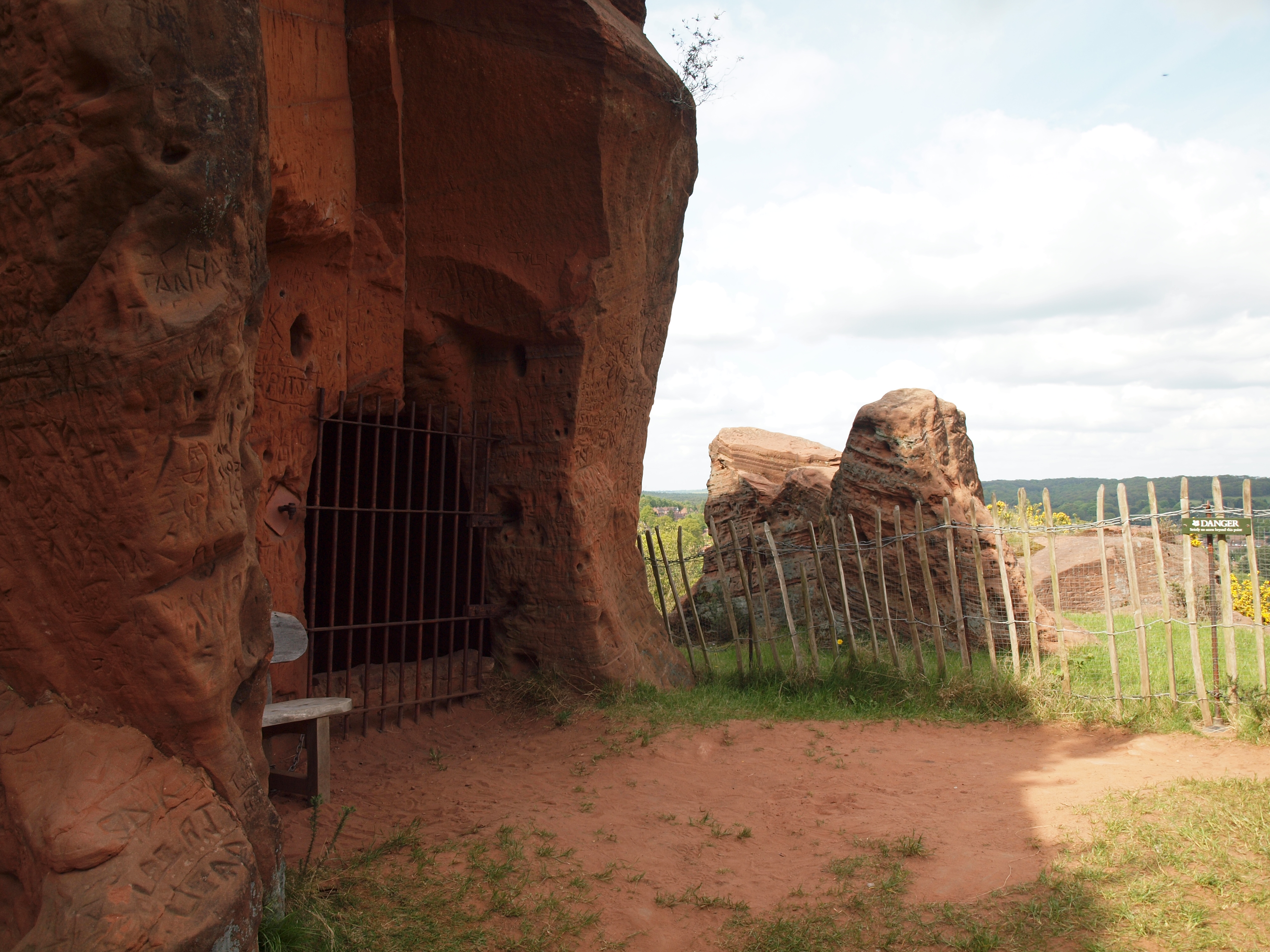
Unrestored rock houses

Kinver Edge is a high heath and woodland escarpment just west of Kinver, about four miles west of Stourbridge, and four miles north of Kidderminster, and is on the border between Worcestershire and Staffordshire, England.

Kinver Edge is home to the last troglodyte dwellings occupied in England, with a set of complete cave-houses excavated into the local sandstone.

It is now owned by the National Trust.

== History ==
Kinver Edge is a remnant of the Mercian forest, although much planting dates from post-1945. There are two Iron Age hillforts on Kinver Edge; the larger one, Kinver Edge Hillfort, is at the northern end, while the other is at the southern end, on a promontory known as Drakelow Hill.

The area has been a popular local tourist destination since Edwardian times, when an electric tramway, the Kinver Light Railway, connected Kinver to the Birmingham tram system.

The National Trust was given 198 acres of Kinver Edge in 1917 by the children of Thomas Grosvenor Lee, a Birmingham solicitor born in Kinver, in memory of Lee and his wife. The Trust acquired a further 85 acres between 1964 and 1980. In 2014 Worcestershire Council Cabinet approved the transfer of Kingsford Forest Park (also known as Kingsford Country Park) to the National Trust. The Forest Park, which covered approximately 200 acres (0.81 km^{2}), lay entirely in Worcestershire where it adjoined the southern end of the Edge. The transfer had been completed by 2018, with 'Kingsford Forest Park' signs being replaced by 'National Trust Kinver Edge' signs. The total area covered by Kinver Edge now amounts to approximately 600 acres. Subsequent to the incorporation of the Forest Park, National Trust notices displayed in 2019 requesting that dogs be kept on leads during the breeding season for heathland birds stated "This request only applies to around 100 acres of the approximately 600 acres of Kinver Edge".

== Rock houses ==
Kinver Edge is home to the last troglodyte dwellings occupied in England, with a set of complete cave-houses excavated into the local sandstone. One of the rocks, Holy Austin, was a hermitage until the Reformation. The Holy Austin Rock Houses were inhabited until the 1960s. They are now owned by the National Trust and are open for tour. One house has been restored to a Victorian appearance, and the Martindale Caves show what life was like in the 1930s. The cottage gardens and an orchard are being replanted and restored.

Other cave dwellings found on Kinver Edge include:

- Nanny's Rock, a large cavern with five compartments which was apparently never converted into a house. For many years it was known as 'Meg-o-Fox-Hole'; the parish register records the death on 8 June 1617 of one 'Margaret of the fox earth' who may have lived there.
- Vale's Rock, also known as Crow's Rock, later turned into a house on two levels. It was also inhabited until the 1960s but because of its dangerous condition has since been fenced off to prevent public access.

== Geography ==
Kinver Edge is situated to the east of the Severn Valley, and is in the South Staffordshire/Wyre Forest Districts. It is situated in green belt land, and is at the very edge of the urban metropolitan West Midlands. Kinver Edge rises to 164 metres (538 ft) above sea level at the summit, and provides views to the Clent Hills, Shatterford Hill, Dudley, Wenlock Edge, Malvern Hills and the Shropshire Hills.

The Edge is a sandstone ridge topped with Bunter pebbles, and is subject to erosion.

== Flora and fauna ==
Kinver Edge contains two areas of heathland, the larger near the top of the escarpment in the north and the smaller in the former Forest Park to the south. The broadleaf woodland in the north includes birch, oak and sweet chestnut trees, while the former Forest Park is largely made up of coniferous plantation woodlands. As of 2020 the National Trust is proposing to restore a further 47.9 acres of heathland in the former Forest Park over the next 10 years.

The heathland on Kinver Edge is inhabited by wildlife, including the adder, common lizard, and heathland birds such as the skylark. Common buzzard, Eurasian jay, great spotted woodpecker, and many other bird species are present in the woods, as are the badger and red fox.

From time to time longhorn cattle are allowed to graze on the heathland areas.

== Contemporary uses ==
The primary economic activity is tourism and estate management. The Staffordshire Way long-distance footpath passes over the summit, while the North Worcestershire Path runs through the former Forest Park, which is also used for mountain biking.
