= Kinver Edge Hillfort =

Iron Age hillfort in Kinver, Staffordshire, England

Coordinates: 52°26′50″N 2°14′34″W

Kinver Edge Hillfort, is a univallate Iron Age hillfort with a massive rampart and outer ditch along the south-west and south-east sides, with natural defences on the remaining sides. The fort is located at the northern end of Kinver Edge, in the civil parish of Kinver, Staffordshire.
