= Kinver Rock Houses =

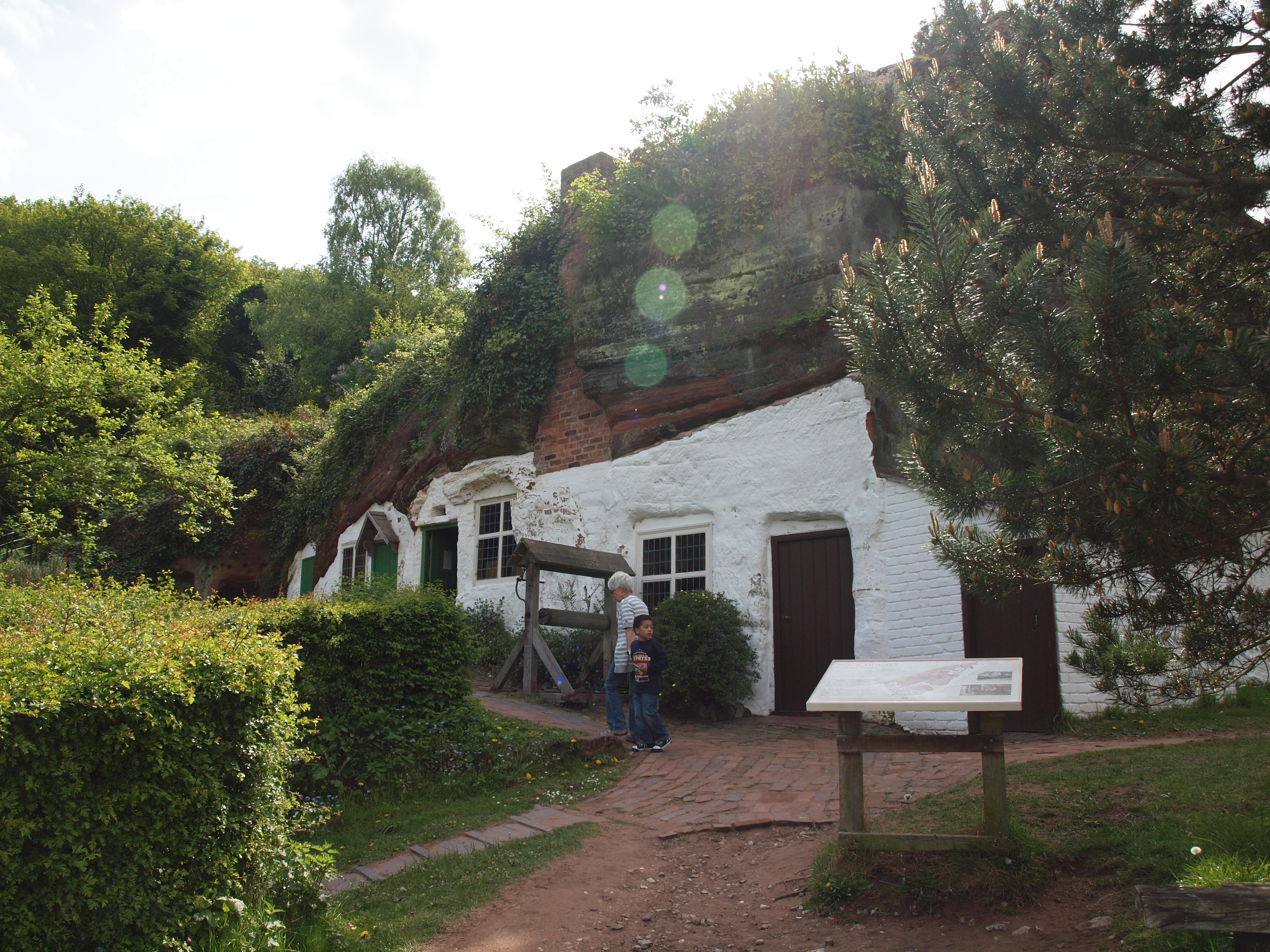
- Holy Austin Rock Houses at Kinver Edge

- Location within Staffordshire

General information
- Type: Rock-cut dwellings
- Architectural style: Vernacular
- Location: Kinver Edge, Staffordshire, England
- Coordinates: 52.4501°N 2.2427°W
- Renovated: 1993–1997
- Owner: National Trust

The Kinver Rock Houses are a series of cave dwellings carved into the sandstone escarpment at Kinver Edge in Staffordshire, England. They represent the last inhabited troglodyte dwellings in England, with residents living in them until the mid-20th century. The rock houses are now owned and managed by the National Trust and are open to the public as a historic attraction.

== History ==
=== Early occupation ===
The earliest documented record of habitation in the rock houses dates from 1617, when the parish register recorded the death of "Margaret of the fox earth" on 8 June, who is believed to have lived in what is now known as Nanny's Rock. However, the caves may have been used for shelter for much longer, potentially dating back thousands of years to the Iron Age, when hillforts were constructed at the top of Kinver Edge.

One of the rock formations, Holy Austin Rock, served as a hermitage until the Reformation (see Kinver Edge).

=== 18th and 19th centuries ===
In 1777, travel writer Joseph Heeley took refuge from a storm at the rock houses and was given shelter by what he described as a "clean and decent family". He noted that the rock houses made excellent homes, being "warm in winter, cool in summer". This account provides valuable insight into the living conditions and social acceptance of the rock house inhabitants during this period.

By the 1861 census, 11 families were recorded as living in the rock houses at Holy Austin Rock. The inhabitants worked in various occupations, including as farm labourers, at the local Hyde Iron Works, in the Black Country industries, and in Kidderminster. Some residents were self-employed, with occupations including laundry women, boatmen, and at least one postman.

The soft red sandstone allowed for relatively easy excavation and expansion of the dwellings. Rooms could be enlarged as families grew, and many rock houses took in lodgers. The interiors featured furniture, stoves, windows, and doors carved into or fitted within the sandstone. Despite having no running water or electricity, the rock houses offered advantages over urban housing of the period, including fresh air, open space, and freedom from the smoke and flooding risks associated with industrial towns.

=== Tourism and the Edwardian era ===
The rock houses gained wider fame in the late 19th and early 20th centuries. In 1903, artist Alfred Rushton RA visited to paint Mr and Mrs Fletcher in their home at Holy Austin Rock. Around the same time, photographer Sir Benjamin Stone documented scenes at the rock houses, creating an important photographic record of the dwellings and their inhabitants.

The opening of the Kinver Light Railway in 1901, an electric tramway connecting Kinver to Amblecote and the Birmingham tram system, made the area more accessible to tourists. The rock houses became a popular tourist attraction during the Edwardian era, with hundreds of visitors from across the West Midlands and beyond coming to see the unusual dwellings.

Residents capitalised on this tourism by serving teas to visitors from their rock homes. Margaret Handley, born in Kinver in 1911, recalled helping her aunt and uncle serve teas in the 1920s, watching for visitors arriving on the trams. Bill Reeves, another resident, remembered making cakes for weekend visitors from the age of 10 or 11. A café continued to operate at the site until 1967, long after the last permanent residents had departed.

=== 20th century decline and abandonment ===
As the 20th century progressed, the rock houses became less desirable as permanent residences. The closure of the Kinver Light Railway tramway service, combined with the lack of modern amenities such as running water and electricity, led families to seek more conventional housing. Most families had left by the 1930s, though some residents remained into the 1950s.

Rose Novak, who lived in one of the rock houses until 1956, provided a detailed description of life there: "Once you got there, it really was nice. They were like three separate cottages, two-room cottages. There were quarry tiles on the floor, the sitting room had carpet down... the walls were sandstone, plastered over. We used to grow everything in the garden. We planted fruit trees, apple and plum and pear. We used to grow all sorts of vegetables, everything."

The last residents left the rock houses in the 1960s (see Kinver Edge). Following their departure, the structures fell into disrepair, suffering from vandalism, uncontrolled vegetation growth, and weather damage over several decades.

== Structure and layout ==
The rock houses at Kinver Edge are carved into the soft red Bunter sandstone of the escarpment. The main complex at Holy Austin Rock is arranged across three levels, with multiple dwellings at each level. The houses feature rooms of varying sizes, determined by how much sandstone could be safely excavated. This allowed for larger rooms and higher ceilings than were typical in contemporary urban cottages and back-to-back houses.

Each dwelling typically included living rooms with fireplaces and cooking ranges, bedrooms, windows and doors fitted into carved openings, whitewashed or plastered interior walls, quarry tile or carpeted floors, gardens and, in some cases, orchards. Water was obtained from wells, and sanitation was provided by earth closets. Later, some houses were connected to gas supplies, though electricity was never installed.

Other rock house sites at Kinver Edge include Nanny's Rock, which is a large cavern with five compartments that was apparently never fully converted into a house. The origin of the name "Nanny" remains unexplained, though local tradition suggests the occupant may have been a herbalist or "white witch". Another site is Vale's Rock, (also known as Crow's Rock), which is a two-level dwelling that was inhabited until the 1960s but has since been fenced off due to its dangerous condition.

== National Trust ownership and restoration ==
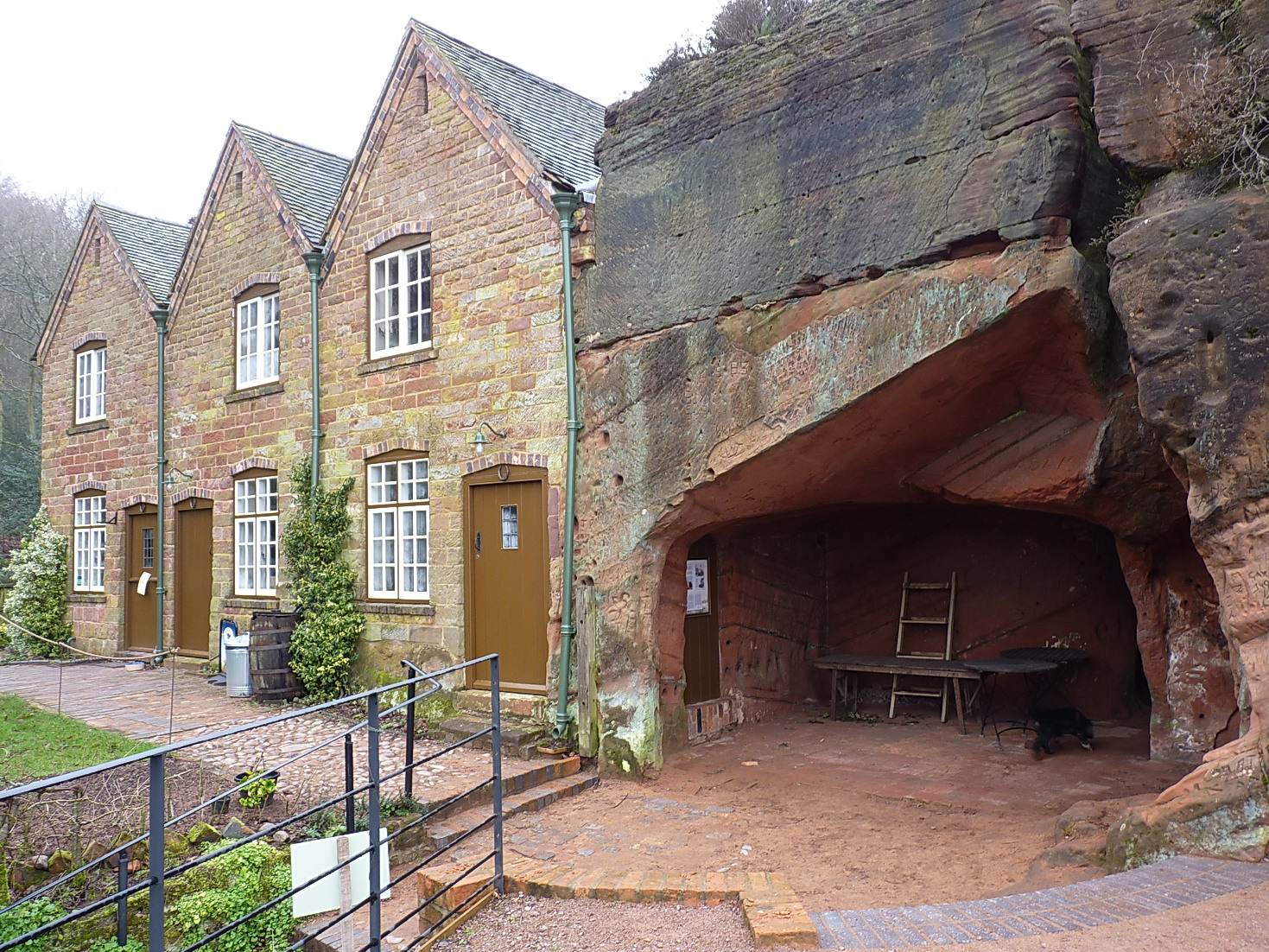
Restoration of the Holy Austin Rock Houses

The National Trust first became involved with Kinver Edge in 1917, when it was given 198 acres of land by the children of Thomas Grosvenor Lee, a Birmingham solicitor born in Kinver, in memory of Lee and his wife. The Trust acquired additional acreage between 1964 and 1980, and in 2014 incorporated the adjacent Kingsford Forest Park, bringing the total area to approximately 600 acres (see Kinver Edge).

=== Restoration programme ===
In the 1980s, a committee formed to campaign for the preservation of the rock houses. Restoration work began in 1993 on the upper-level houses, which were restored as a family home with a custodian in residence. The restoration was based on extensive photographic evidence and the memories of former residents.

In 1996, work commenced on the lower level, focusing on the former home of Mr and Mrs Fletcher. The large space known as the Ballroom was secured with brick arches and rock bolting. Windows and doors were reconstructed to match the originals, chimneys were rebuilt, and fireplaces were installed. Using the 1903 Rushton painting and photographic evidence, Fletcher's Cottage was recreated to represent life in the rock houses in the early 1900s. The restored rock houses reopened to visitors in October 1997.

The upper level of houses now operates as a tearoom, continuing the tradition of serving refreshments to visitors that began in the Edwardian era.

== Cultural significance ==
The Kinver Rock Houses represent a unique form of vernacular architecture and provide insight into alternative housing solutions during the Industrial Revolution. Despite the stigma sometimes associated with cave dwelling, residents of the rock houses often enjoyed better living conditions than their urban counterparts, with lower population density, cleaner air, and greater longevity.

The rock houses challenge conventional narratives about progress and modernity, demonstrating that "primitive" housing could offer advantages over contemporary urban developments. The dwellings also illustrate the adaptability of human settlement patterns and the creative use of natural geological features for shelter.

As the last inhabited troglodyte dwellings in England, the Kinver Rock Houses hold particular historical significance, representing the end of a housing tradition that may have existed in Britain for thousands of years.

== Visitor information ==
The Holy Austin Rock Houses are open to the public as part of the National Trust's Kinver Edge property. Visitors can tour Fletcher's Cottage, which has been restored to its early 1900s appearance, and the Martindale Caves, which show life in the 1930s. The cottage gardens and orchard have been replanted and restored to their historical appearance.

The site requires ongoing maintenance, including regular rock surveys to ensure visitor safety. The National Trust continues to seek funding for conservation work.

== See also ==
- Kinver Edge
- Vernacular architecture
- Troglodyte
- Rock-cut architecture
