= Major's Green =

Village in Worcestershire, England

Coordinates: 52.3957°N 1.8515°W

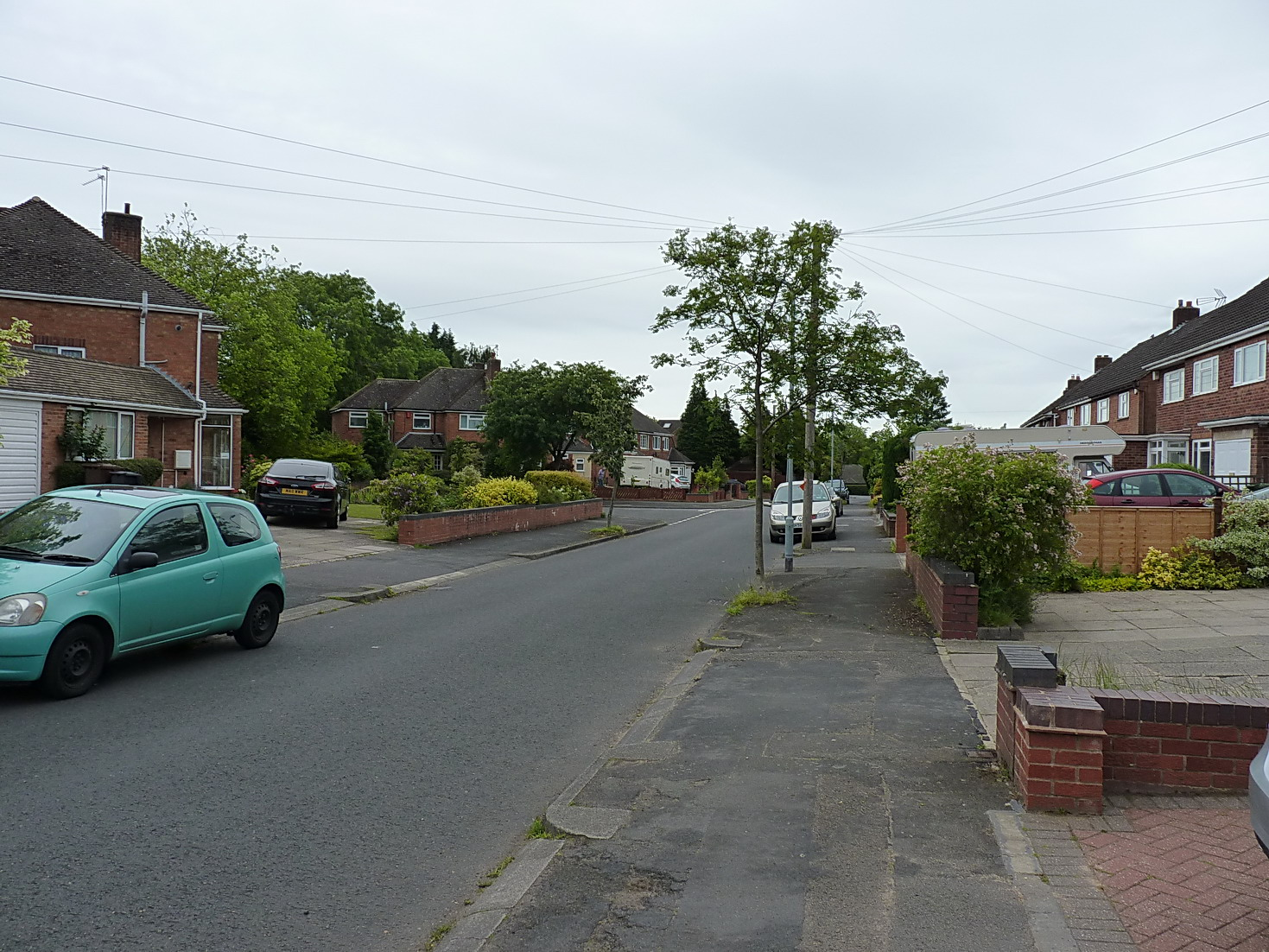
- Rushleigh Road, Major's Green

- Location within Worcestershire
- Population: 973; Major's Green Polling District area of the Trueman's Heath Parish Ward part of Wythall East Ward
- OS grid reference: SP102775
- Civil parish: Wythall
- District: Bromsgrove
- Shire county: Worcestershire
- Region: West Midlands
- Country: England
- Sovereign state: United Kingdom
- Post town: SOLIHULL
- Postcode district: B90
- Dialling code: 0121
- Police: West Mercia
- Fire: Hereford and Worcester
- Ambulance: West Midlands

Major's Green is a village in the Wythall parish of Bromsgrove district and is the northeasternmost settlement in the county of Worcestershire, England.

The village is served by Whitlocks End railway station as well as bus services 664/665 to and from Solihull, and is the location of The Drawbridge Public House named after the adjacent drawbridge on the Stratford-upon-Avon Canal.

The village is closely associated with the surrounding West Midlands county (3 of the 4 roads from the village lead into the Metropolitan Borough of Solihull) in respect of transport and amenities, and as such can also be considered an outer suburb of Shirley. The Solihull suburbs of Hasluck's Green and Solihull Lodge are directly to the northeast and northwest respectively.

Indeed the village was located within Solihull Municipal Borough and hence the county of Warwickshire until 1962. Originally the county boundary had continued along the River Cole between Houndsfield Lane northward to Peter Brook but in the 13th century it moved half a mile westwards to Trueman's Heath (The Fordrough) and the 700 year old pre-1962 border continues to delineate the Birmingham B47 from the Solihull B90 B postcode areas.

Thirty years after the change in county, as part of a Local Government Boundary Commission for England review, Solihull MBC initially suggested that Major's Green should be transferred from Bromsgrove back to its area, but subsequently withdrew the suggestion in the face of opposition from others.

The nearest primary school is Mill Lodge, with the nearest in-county primary school being Coppice, Hollywood, which is also equidistant with Tidbury Green School. Being in-catchment, secondary aged children living in Major's Green are guaranteed a place at Woodrush High School if they so choose, whilst Light Hall School is also within walking distance.

Hollywood Travel excursions and coach hire company is based in the village, as is the five lake Woods Farm Fishery and the adjacent Wake Green Amateur Football Club (both located next to the Drawbridge PH). The clubhouse of Shirley Town (junior) Football Club, based opposite the railway station car park entrance on Tilehouse Lane, opens as a public cafe at weekends.

The site of an Iron Age hill fort, Berry Mound lies just outside Major's Green as does the eastern end of the North Worcestershire Path (on Peterbrook Road near the junction with Aqueduct Road). Another waymarked path starts just a few hundred metres north in Green Lane Park. This is the Cole Valley Route from Shirley (Mill Lodge) to Chelmsley Wood via Small Heath (Ackers) passing through the Shire Country Park. The direct link between the ends of the two paths, Aqueduct Road, was not pedestrian friendly, particularly under the high narrow canal bridge known as Major's Green Aqueduct, until the road was closed to through traffic in 2026.
