= Berry Mound =

Iron Age hill fort

- Location within Worcestershire

General information
- Type: Hill fort
- Location: Major's Green, England
- Coordinates: 52.39875°N 1.86119°W
- Elevation: 480 ft (150 m) AOD
- Construction started: Iron Age

Technical details
- Size: 11 acres (4.5 ha)

Berry Mound is an Iron Age hill fort in the Bromsgrove district of Worcestershire, near Shirley, West Midlands, on the outskirts of Birmingham. It has been dated to the 1st or 2nd century BC.

The fort covers 11 acres (4.5 ha), measuring 450 ft (140 m) from north to south and 200 ft (61 m) from east to west. It is surrounded by a 24 ft (7.3 m) wide earth rampart. To the north was a V-shaped ditch that was 15 ft (4.6 m) wide and 6 ft (1.8 m) deep, to the south one 22 ft (6.7 m) wide and 7 ft (2.1 m) deep. Faint traces of a second rampart or defensive terrace to the north were observed in 1959, and 19th century observers recorded the existence of a third line of ramparts and ditches, though no traces of these remain.

The entrance to the fort was on the east side, though it is possible that there was originally a second entrance located on an axis with the first, as at the similar Sutton Walls Hill Fort.

The site was excavated in 1959, with traces of timber revetments being found on the ramparts.

The site has previously been known as "Danes camp field" and "Danes bury field" the term Berry or Bury comes from the old English "Burgh" meaning defensive position so was presumably known to the early English. There are local stories concerning King Alfred doing battle with the Danes who had been trapped in Berry Mound, excavations at the site showed signs of refortification at a later date which would fit in with this story.

Nearby to the south west lies a Site of Special Scientific Interest, Berry Mound Pastures, comprising an area of 11.84 hectares (29.26 acres) of horse grazed pasture land and meadow. The site was first notified in 1994. The interest of the site lies in the diversity of the semi-natural grassland. In addition there is a stream and a small pond, and much rich flora and fauna can be found here.

== Images ==
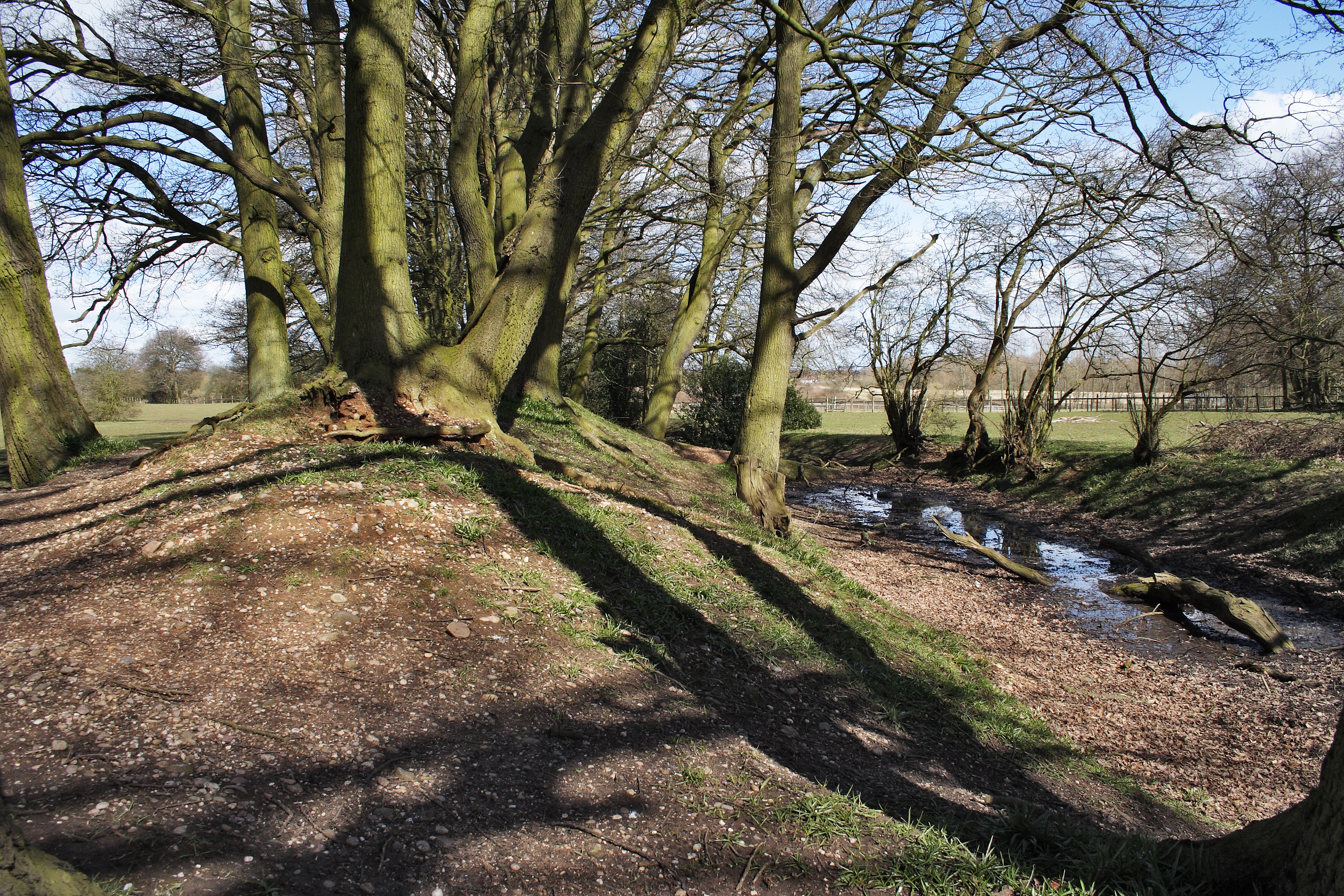
Earthwork ramparts

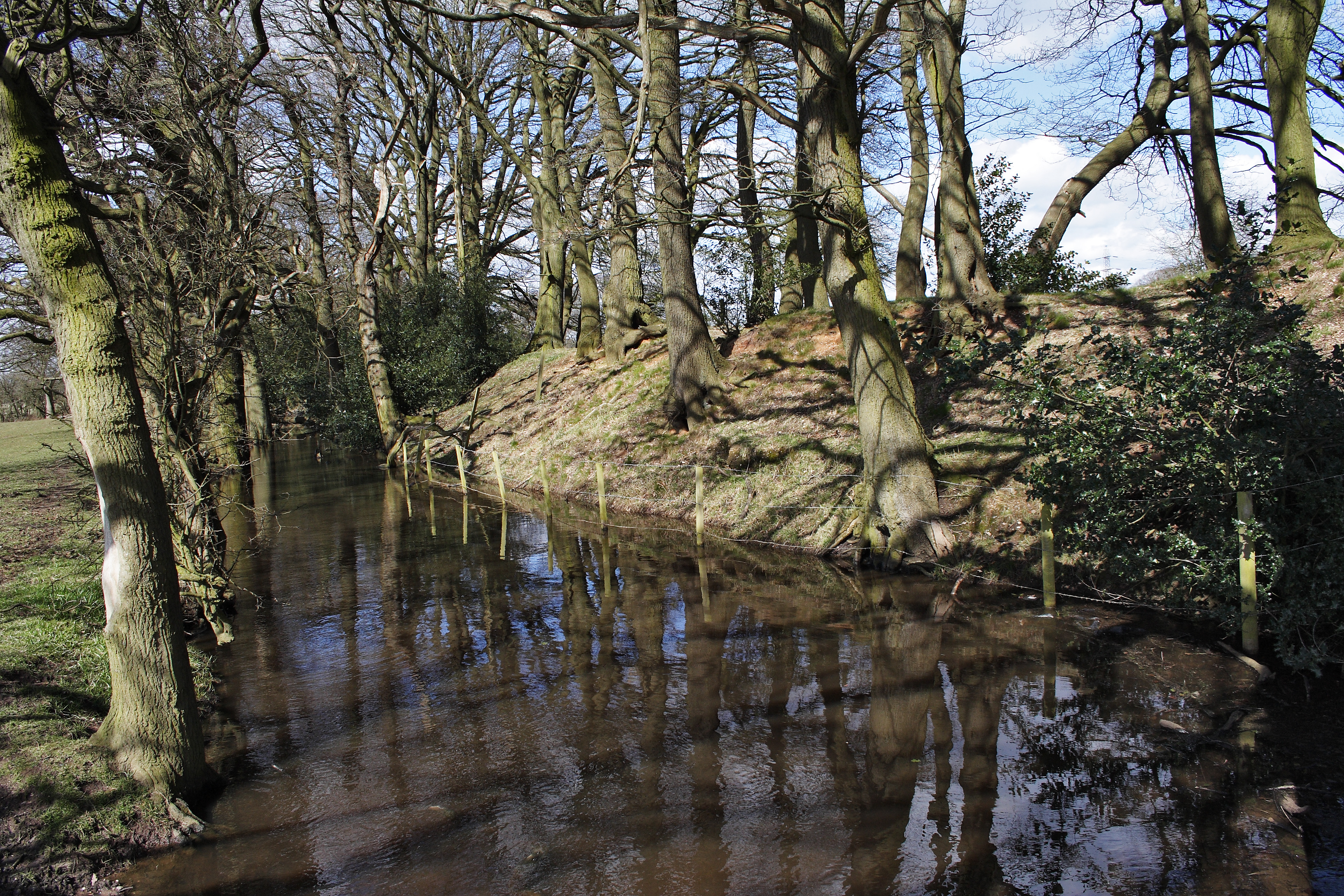
Defensive ditch
