= Shakespeare's Way =

Long-distance footpath in southern England

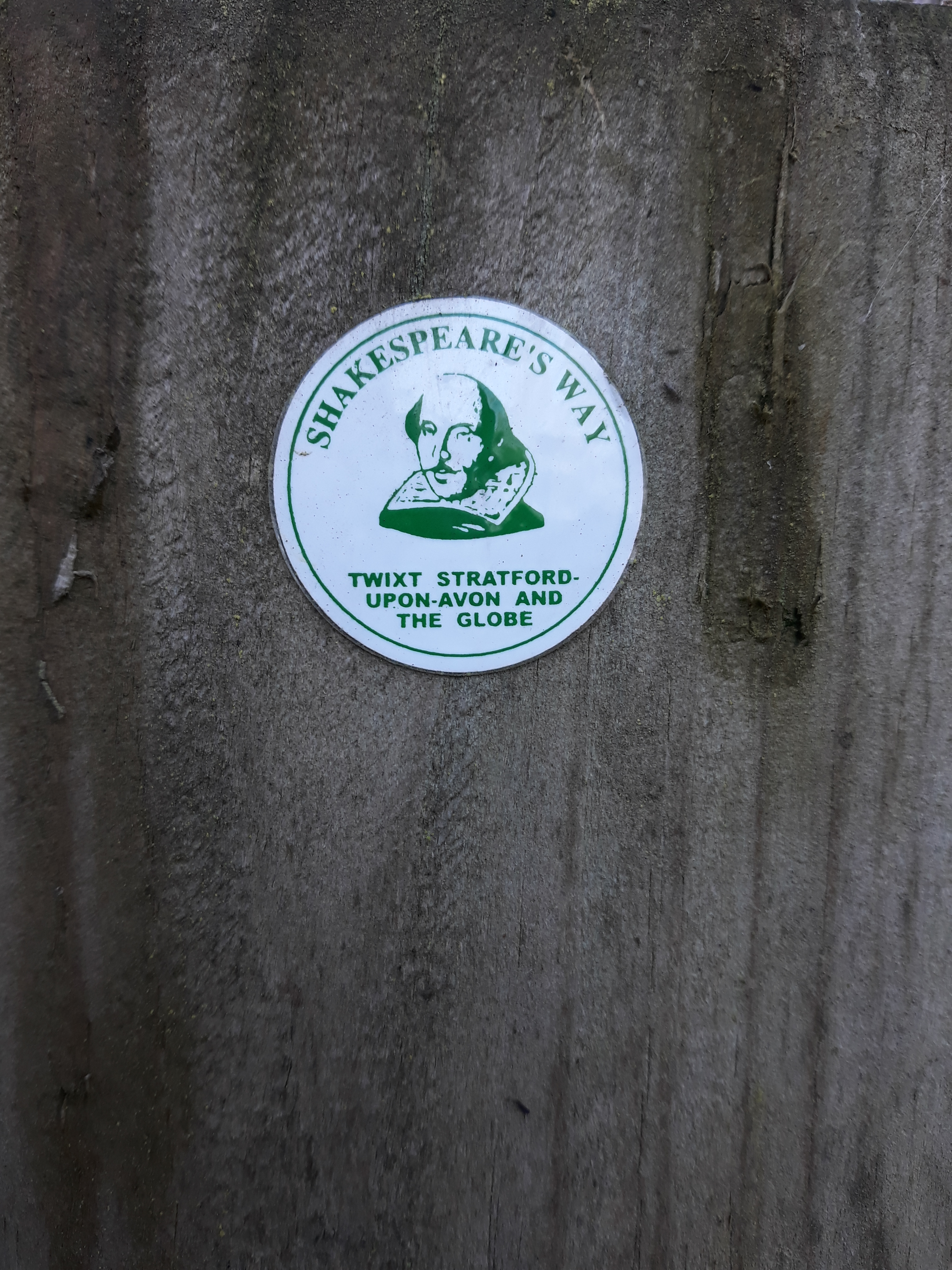
Shakespeare's Way waymarker in Oxfordshire

Shakespeare's Way is a waymarked long-distance footpath through the Midlands and south of England, United Kingdom.

== The route ==
The 235km (146mi) waymarked route (which opened in 2006) runs from William Shakespeare's birthplace in Stratford-upon-Avon in Warwickshire to the modern Shakespeare's Globe (near the site of the original Globe Theatre), on the south bank of the River Thames in London. The Globe replicates a late Elizabethan or early Jacobean theatre of the period.

The route is intended to shadow a possible route taken by Shakespeare himself when journeying between London, where he acted and wrote his plays, and his home in Stratford. A companion route, the Shakespeare's Avon Way, was launched in 2008 with an intersecting point at Stratford-upon-Avon.

The route passes through the valley of the River Stour, Warwickshire, part of the Cotswolds, Oxford, the Chiltern Hills and enters the Thames Valley at Marlow, Buckinghamshire before following the Grand Union Canal and then the Thames Path into London.
