= Table Hill =

Hill in England

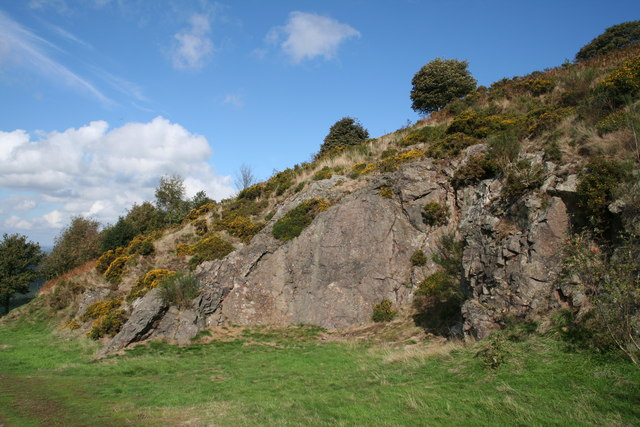
- Quarry on Table Hill

Highest point
- Elevation: 373 m (1,224 ft)
- Prominence: c. 337 metres (1,106 ft)
- Parent peak: Worcestershire Beacon
- Coordinates: 52.1155°N 2.3421°W

Geography
- Location: Malvern Hills, England
- Topo map: OS Landranger 150

Geology
- Rock age: Pre-Cambrian
- Mountain type(s): Igneous, Metamorphic

Climbing
- Easiest route: Hiking

Table Hill is situated in the range of Malvern Hills that runs about 13 kilometres (8 mi) north-south along the Herefordshire-Worcestershire border. It lies between North Hill and Sugarloaf Hill and has an elevation of 373 metres (1,224 ft).

== History ==
Although the flint route from North Wales to Wessex lay to the north of Malvern, there is some evidence to suggest that traders passed over the Malvern Hills. Parts of an arrowhead, a scraper and flint flakes have been discovered between North Hill and Table Hill. A 19th-century guidebook describes a collapsed burial mound on North Hill, named the Giant's Grave, and a tump on Table Hill. These tumuli may have been connected to the Dobunni settlement in Mathon:

Upon the Table Hill, you will perceive the figure of a large table, from which the name is derived. In the centre is a cross, of the same size as that by the Giant's Grave, upon North Hill.
