= Stareton =

Hamlet in Warwickshire, England

Coordinates: 52.338824°N 1.508986°W

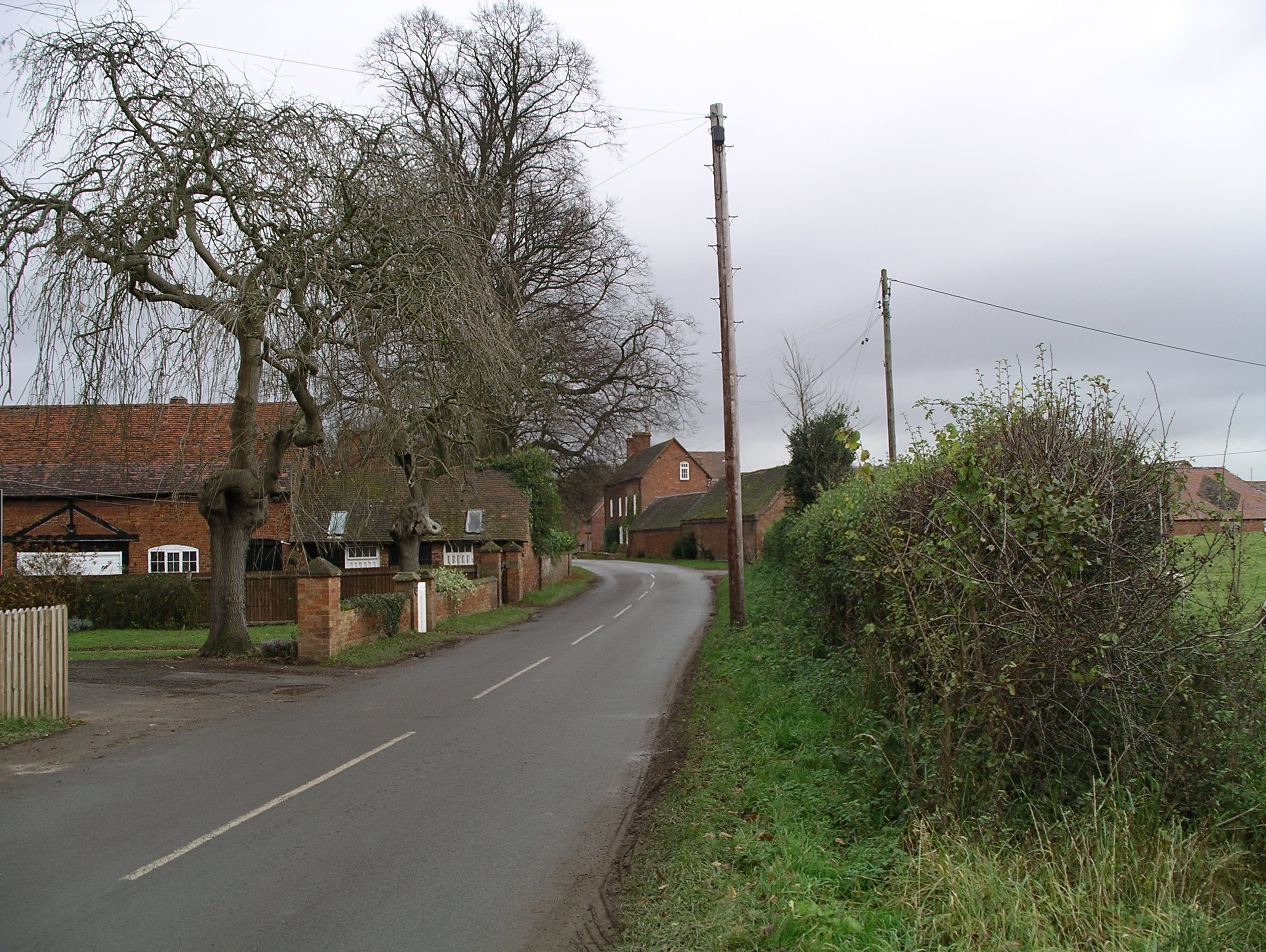
- The main road through Stareton

- Location within Warwickshire
- OS grid reference: SP334713
- District: Warwick
- Shire county: Warwickshire
- Region: West Midlands
- Country: England
- Sovereign state: United Kingdom
- Post town: Kenilworth
- Postcode district: CV8
- Police: Warwickshire
- Fire: Warwickshire
- Ambulance: West Midlands

Stareton is a small hamlet in Warwickshire, England. The population is included within Stoneleigh parish. It is situated about half a mile from Stoneleigh Park, between Leamington Spa and Coventry.
