= Staffordshire Way =

92-mile footpath in Staffordshire, England

Coordinates: 53.1130°N 2.2143°W

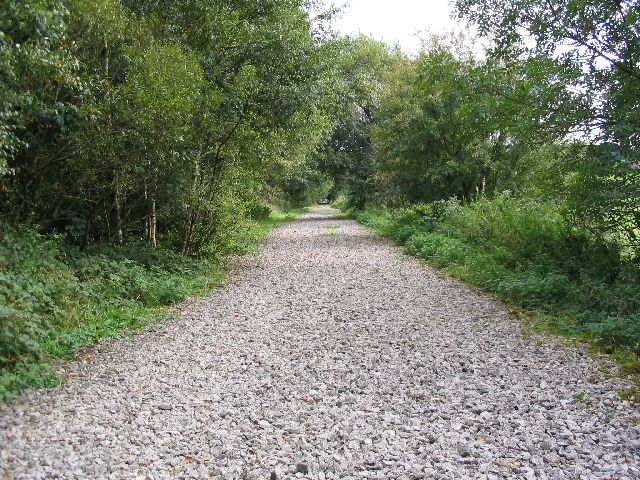
- Length: 92 mi (148 km)
- Location: Staffordshire, England
- Trailheads: Mow Cop; Kinver Edge
- Use: Hiking
- Elevation gain/loss: 2,194 metres (7,198 ft)
- Highest point: 323 metres (1,060 ft)

The Staffordshire Way is a long-distance walk in Staffordshire, England. The path links with the Cheshire Gritstone Trail, the Heart of England Way and the North Worcestershire Path.

The Way was opened in three stages by Staffordshire County Council between 1977 and 1983 and was resurveyed and refurbished with the assistance of the Ramblers' Association to mark the Association's 60th anniversary in 1995.

== The route ==
Starting at Mow Cop Castle on gritstone hills on the edge of the Peak District in North Staffordshire, the Staffordshire Way follows the Staffordshire/Cheshire border northeast for 6 miles (10 km) to the summit of the Cloud (a route shared with the Gritstone Trail). It then traverses southeast through Staffordshire's countryside for 86 miles (138 km) passing through Leek, then along the Caldon Canal through the Churnet Valley to Rocester and Uttoxeter. The route then goes southwest through the Trent Valley, Shugborough Hall parkland and Cannock Chase (an Area of Outstanding Natural Beauty) to Penkridge. From Penkridge it turns south passing near to Brewood and continuing southwest through the parkland of Chillington Hall and close to Weston Park. It then turns south again passing through Codsall, within half a mile of Perton and near to Patshull Hall and Pattingham. It then continues south near to Enville and Highgate Common before finishing at the dramatic sandstone ridge of Kinver Edge.

The 47.5-mile (76.4 km) section between Rushton Spencer and Cannock Chase is now part of European walking route E2. The path connects with the North Worcestershire Path and the Worcestershire Way at Kinver Edge, the Heart of England Way at Cannock Chase, the Limestone Way at Rocester and the Gritstone Trail in north Staffordshire.

== Hazards ==
It is recommended to take an Ordnance Survey map when walking the Staffordshire Way as there are patches of the route that are poorly signposted. Parts of the route are frequented less than others and as such can become intensely boggy, especially after heavy and/or prolonged rainfall. As some parts of the route are across farm fields, expect the way ahead to be blocked by occasional herds of dairy cattle and itinerant horses.

== Photos of the Staffordshire Way ==
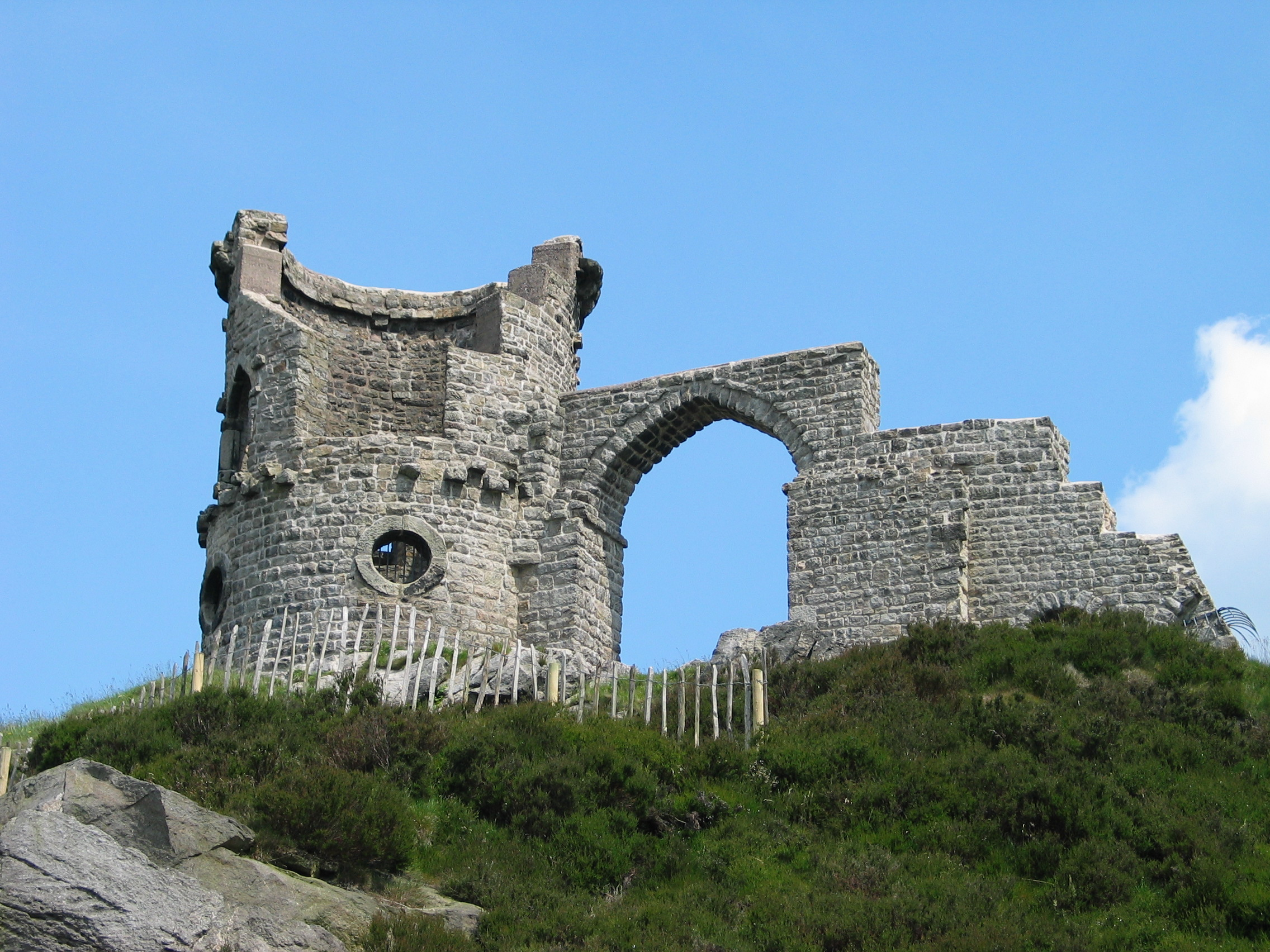
Mow Cop Castle

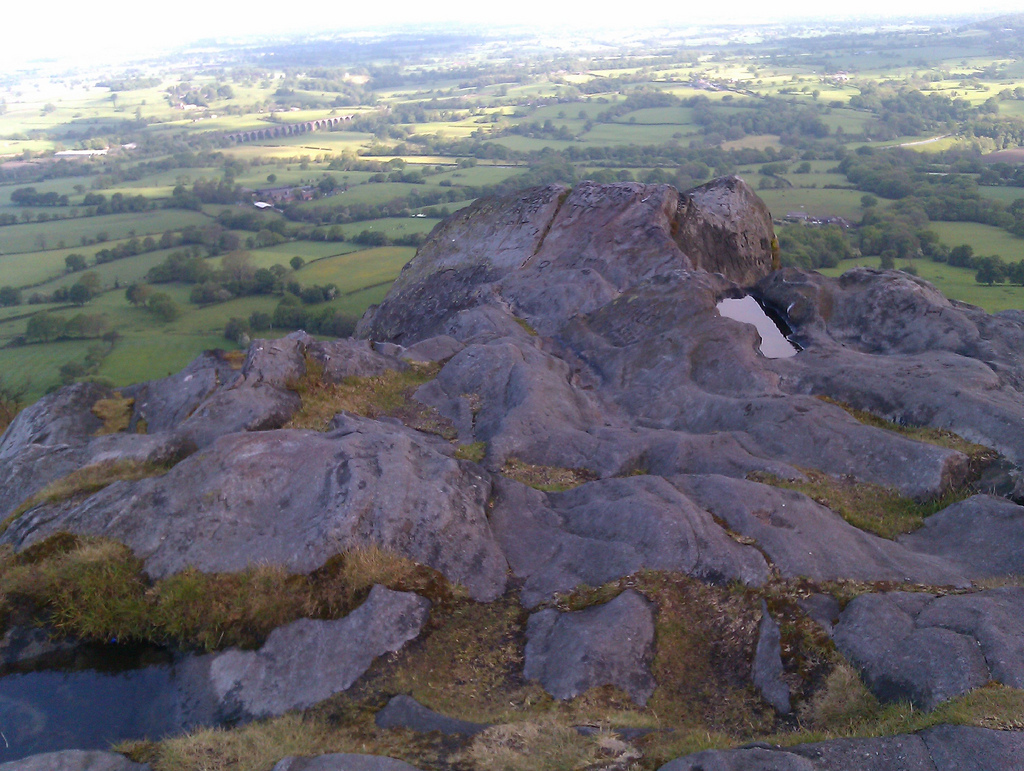
View of the Cheshire Plain from the top of the Cloud

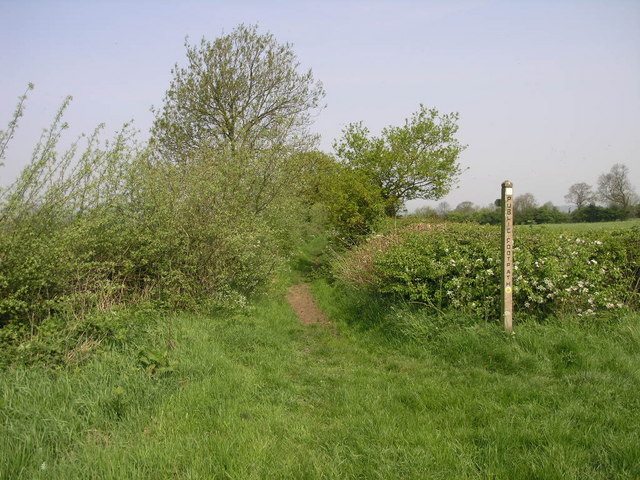
As a small path just before Uttoxeter

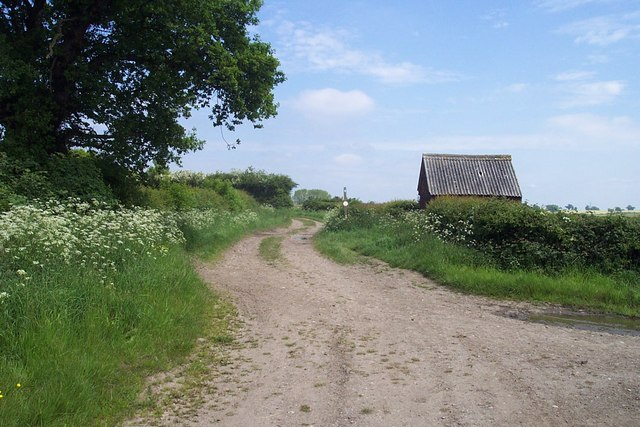
As a track near Abbots Bromley

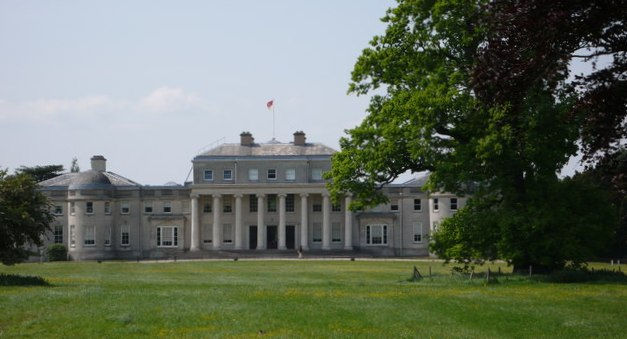
Shugborough Hall

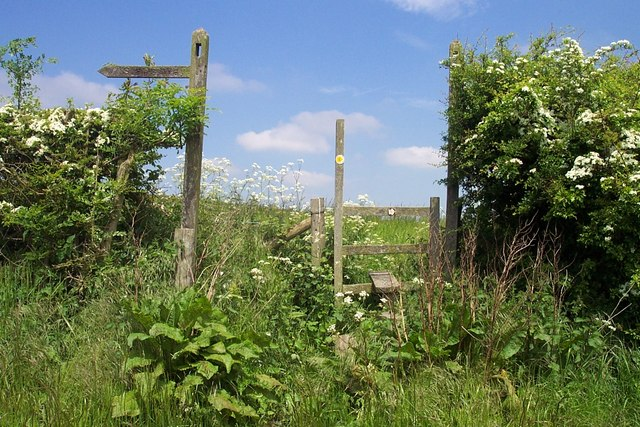
Running through a field near Bagots Forest

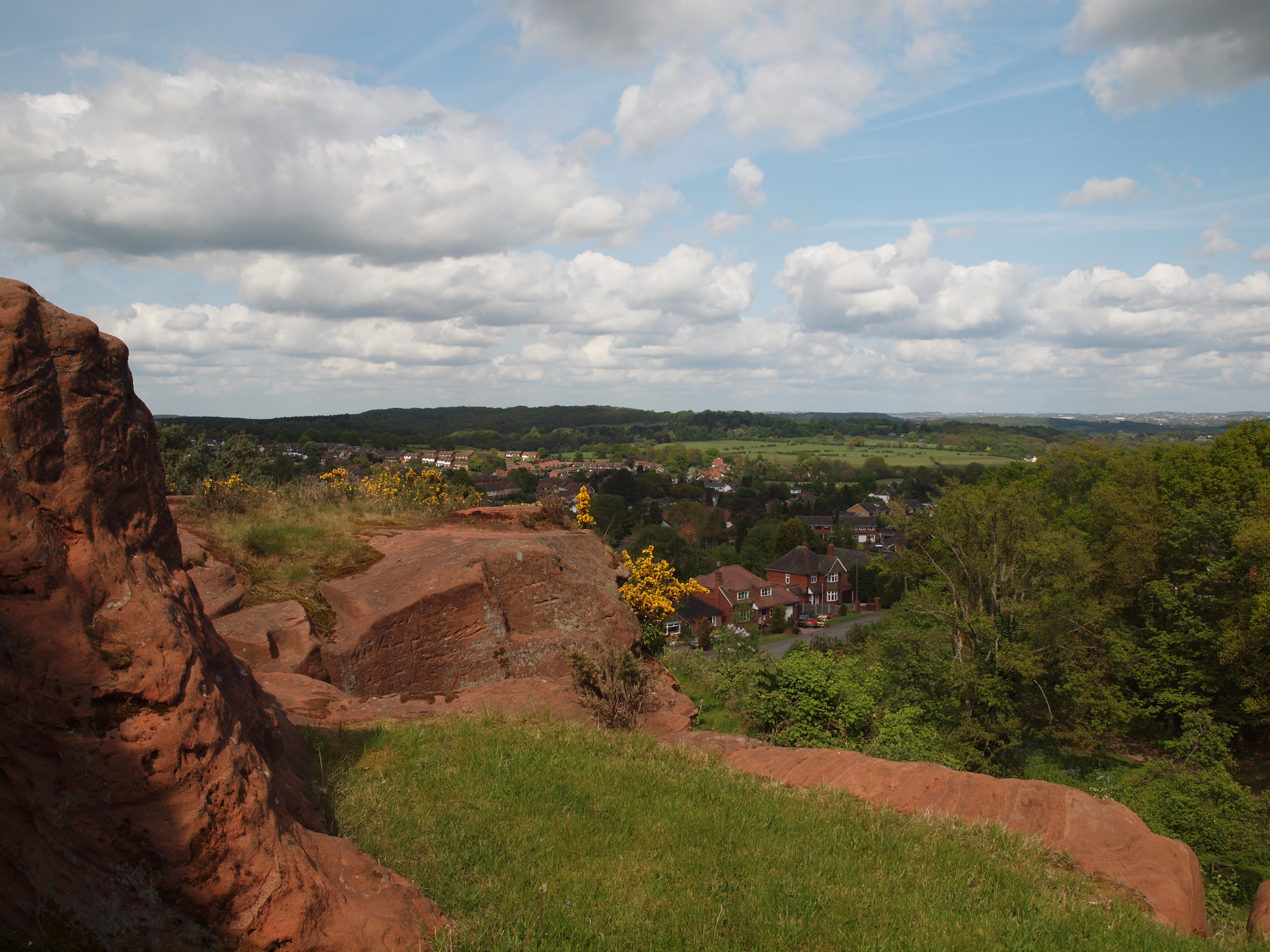
Kinver as seen from Holy Austin Rock House at Kinver Edge
