= Kingsford Country Park =

Heathland and woodland in the United Kingdom

Kingsford National Trust Worcestershire, England, U.K. is owned and managed by National Trust ‘Kinver Edge and The Rock Houses’ under the NT Shropshire portfolio, it is the southern half of the Kinver Edge escarpment. The historically open heathland area was traditionally known as Blakeshall Common. The area contains a number of sandstone geological features like Vales Rock, with its layers of rock cut dwellings that were formerly inhabited for many centuries.

The Worcestershire area of the NT escarpment covers 200 acres of the full 600 acres that spans two counties, consisting mainly of man planted, post war, pine crop and native broadleaf woodland with pockets of rare ancient heathland under restoration. The free to access area stretches over a terrain of undulating hillside with steep cliffs below the escarpment and more gentle sloped areas above it. There are numerous sandy paths, a number of which are route marked individual or shared use trails, for walkers, horse riders and mountain bikers. Some areas visitors are requested to keep dogs on leads to protect ground nesting birds during nesting season. Longhorn cattle are often in residence as part of the ongoing heathland restoration. Rare adder population are sometimes visible, but being shy creatures they usually hide in the undergrowth. The Sandy Scrapes Project is encouraging rare invertebrates like the solitary bee to thrive. The endangered Oil Beetle is now often spotted. A number of rare birds are in residence from greater spotted woodpecker to nightjars and several Kingsford Cuckoos return annually.

Parking is available at Vales Rock carpark on Kingsford Lane and Blakeshall Lane car park off Blakeshall Lane, both carparks are gated, open times vary with the seasons, please check NT website for more information.

== Transfer to the National Trust ==
In 2014 the Worcestershire Council Cabinet approved a report proposing the transfer of the freehold of Kingsford Forest Park to the National Trust. In November 2014 the council's Overview and Scrutiny Performance Board accepted the report, noting that it could be implemented immediately without being considered again by Cabinet or the full Council, and that the Council did not have a duty to consult with the public on such transfers or the potential introduction of car park charges by another organisation. In September 2015 it was reported that the deal was still to be finalised. As of 2018, 'Kingsford Forest Park' signs at the entrances in Kingsford Lane and Blakeshall Lane have been removed and replaced by 'National Trust Kinver Edge' signs.

In April 2019 the National Trust announced plans to fence off large parts of the Country Park and to cut down trees on Blakeshall Common in order to turn it into a traditional lowland heath.

== References/External Links ==
- Enjoy England- Kingsford Forest Park.
- The AA - Kingsford Country Park and villages
- Kinver Edge
- Kingsford Forest Park
