= North Hill, Malvern =

Hill in the Malvern Hills, England

Coordinates: 52.11454°N 2.33914°W

North Hill
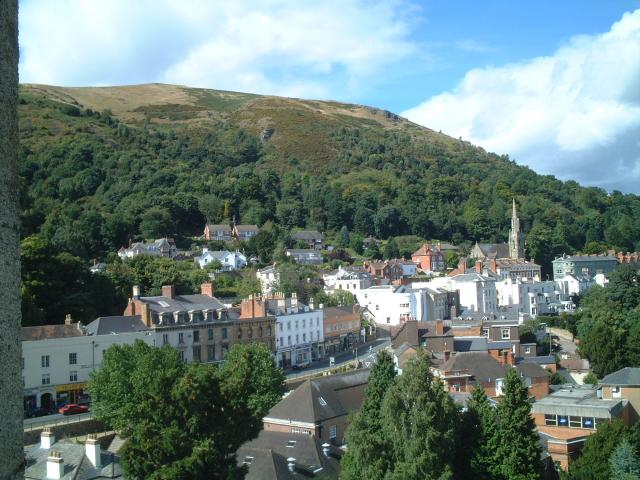
- North Hill from Great Malvern Priory

Highest point
- Elevation: 397 m (1,302 ft)
- Prominence: 15 m (50 ft)
- Parent peak: Worcestershire Beacon

Geography
- Location: Malvern Hills, England
- OS grid: SO768462
- Topo map: OS Landranger 150

Geology
- Rock age: Pre-Cambrian
- Mountain type(s): Igneous, Metamorphic

Climbing
- Easiest route: Hiking

North Hill is the second highest point of the range of Malvern Hills that runs about 13 kilometres (8.1 mi) north-south along the Herefordshire-Worcestershire border, although North Hill lies entirely within Worcestershire. It has an elevation of 397 metres (1,302 ft), making it the highest point of the Worcestershire Way.

The eastern flank of the hill lies directly behind Worcester road in Great Malvern from where its summit is a brisk 15 – 20 minutes steep walk from the town centre via St Ann's road and Happy Valley. A path from the car park in North Malvern follows the lower contour of North Hill to Happy Valley and St. Ann's Well.

== History ==
Although the flint route from North Wales to Wessex lay to the north of Malvern, there is some evidence to suggest that traders passed over the Malvern Hills. Parts of an arrowhead, scraper and flint flakes have been discovered between the North Hill and Table Hill. A 19th-century guide book describes both a collapsed burial mound on North Hill named the Giant's Grave and a tump on Table Hill. These tumuli may have been connected to the Dobunni settlement in Mathon.

A track that runs along North Hill was known as the "Pyx Path" and was used by the priest from Worcestershire when bringing Sacrament to the hermits that lived in Malvern in the 11th Century. It was also referred to as the "Pixie Path", as it was believed to be used by fairies. The Lodge spring can be found at the foot of North Hill, off Worcester road. The ornamental fountain has a small spout and basin that is similar in design to those at St Ann's Well.

== Folklore ==
In Early British Trackways, Moats, Mounds, Camps, and Sites Alfred Watkins theorised that North Hill was the beginning of a ley line to Pen-y-Beacon via Mathon Church, Moat at Birchend, Stretton Grandison Church, Shucknell Hill, White Stone Chapel, Burcot Pool, Ten Houses Pond and Sugwas Park.

== The Worcestershire Way ==
When launched back in 1989 the Worcestershire Way was 48 miles (77 km) long and ran partly into Herefordshire. The route and its length were modified in 2004 and it now runs wholly within Worcestershire. The last few miles of the Way now ascend to the northern part of the Malvern Hills and skirt around the contours of End Hill, Table Hill and along Lady Howard de Walden's Drive on North Hill, before descending to Great Malvern via St Ann's Well.
