= Gloucestershire Way =

100-mile footpath in Gloucestershire, England

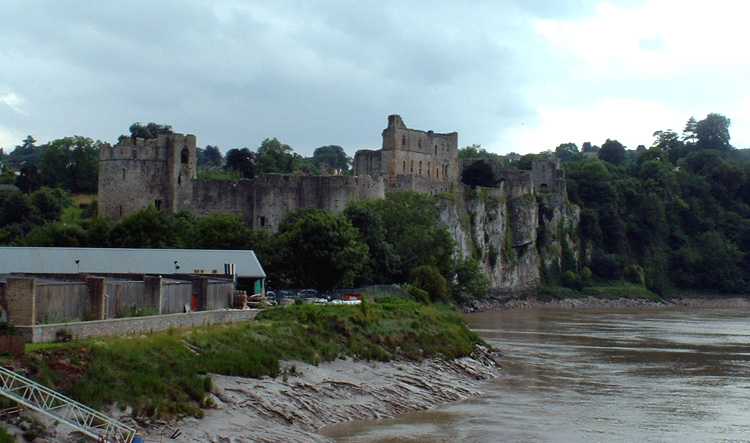
- Chepstow Castle lies on the trail
- Length: 100 mi (160 km)
- Location: Gloucestershire, England
- Trailheads: Tutshill; 51.648°N 2.666°W; Tewkesbury; 51.996°N 2.137°W
- Use: Hiking

The Gloucestershire Way is a long-distance footpath, in the English county of Gloucestershire. It was devised by Gerry and Kate Stewart, of the Ramblers Association and Tewkesbury Walking Club. The 100-mile (160-kilometre) route, which uses existing Rights of Way, goes from Tutshill, just north of Chepstow, crosses the river Severn at Gloucester, proceeding then to Tewkesbury, with a 'Worcestershire Way Link'.

In detail the stages are:

Chepstow to Parkend – 13.5 miles (21.7 km)
Parkend to May Hill – 14 miles (23 km)
May Hill to Gloucester – 13 miles (21 km)
Gloucester to Crickley – 12 miles (19 km)
Crickley to Salperton – 12 miles (19 km)
Salperton to Stow-on-the-Wold – 11 miles (18 km)
Stow to Winchcombe – 13 miles (21 km)
Winchcombe to Tewkesbury – 11.5 miles (18.5 km)
Worcestershire Way Link – 12 miles (19 km)
