= Worcestershire Way =

31-mile footpath in Worcestershire, England

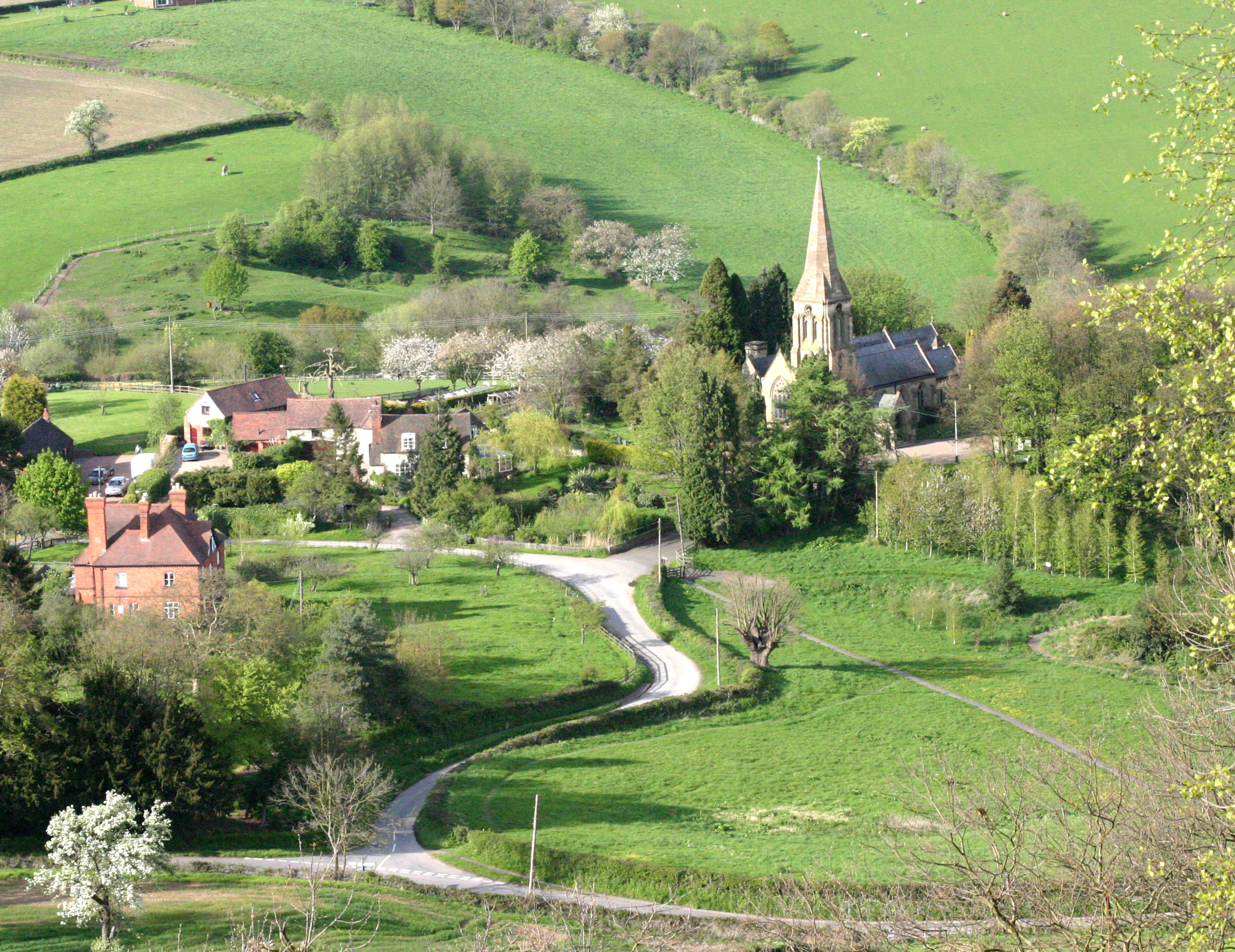
- St Mary's and village green, Abberley
- Length: 31 mi (50 km)
- Location: Worcestershire, England
- Designation: Long-distance trail
- Trailheads: Bewdley; Great Malvern
- Use: Hiking
- Highest point: North Hill, Malvern 336 metres (1,102 ft)
- Difficulty: moderate
- Season: All year

The Worcestershire Way is a waymarked long-distance trail within the county of Worcestershire, England. It runs 31 miles (50 km) from Bewdley to Great Malvern.

== History ==
When launched back in 1989 the Worcestershire Way was 48 miles (77 km) long and ran partly into Herefordshire. The route and its length were modified in 2004 and it now runs wholly within Worcestershire.

== The route ==
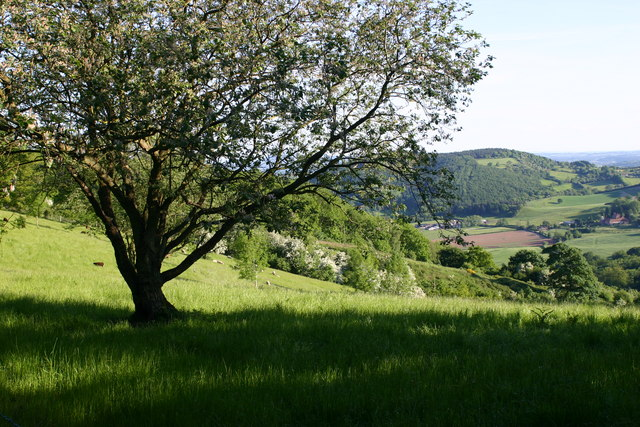
From Abberley Hill

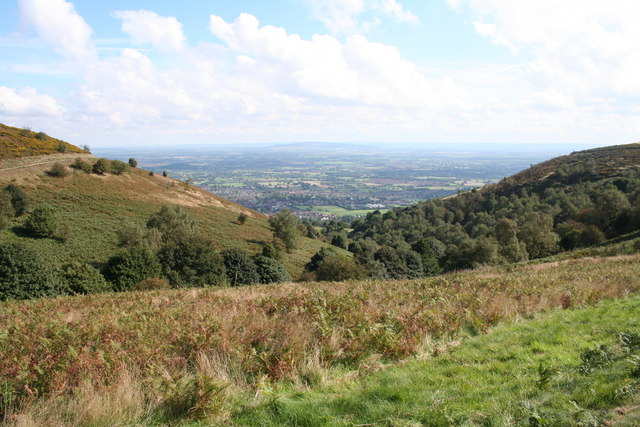
Green Valley, Malvern Hills

The Worcestershire Way begins in the Georgian town of Bewdley. The official start/end point can be found as a finger post and information board at the side of the River Severn, next to Dog Lane car park.

The route then runs south to Ribbesford and Heightington before passing through woodland on narrow winding lanes down to Abberley Hill. From Abberley Hill the route goes south and up the steep Walsgrove Hill with views over the Teme Valley before continuing south to Ankerdine Hill and the Suckley Hills. From the Suckely Hills the Worcestershire Way heads south-east towards the Malvern Hills. The route over the northern Malvern Hills is way-marked with stone direction markers which can be difficult to find.

The route circles North Hill before making its final descent past St. Ann's Well and finishing in Great Malvern.

The official start/end point can be found as an information board opposite the Post Office on Abbey Road.

== Places of interest ==
The Worcestershire Way passes numerous places of interest, including St Leonard's church in Ribbesford, Abberley Clock Tower, Birchwood Common (where Sir Edward Elgar composed much of his music), the Malvern Hills and St. Ann's Well.

== Circular walks ==
Official circular walks along the Worcestershire Way include:

Ribbesford Circular Trail
The Abberley Circular Walk
The Martley Circular Walk
Walks on the Northern Malvern Hills

== Connecting trails ==
The Way links with the North Worcestershire Path in the north — which in turn links to the Staffordshire Way.

It also overlaps with the Geopark Way at several points and meets with the Three Choirs Way at Knightwick.

== See also ==
- Long-distance footpaths in the United Kingdom

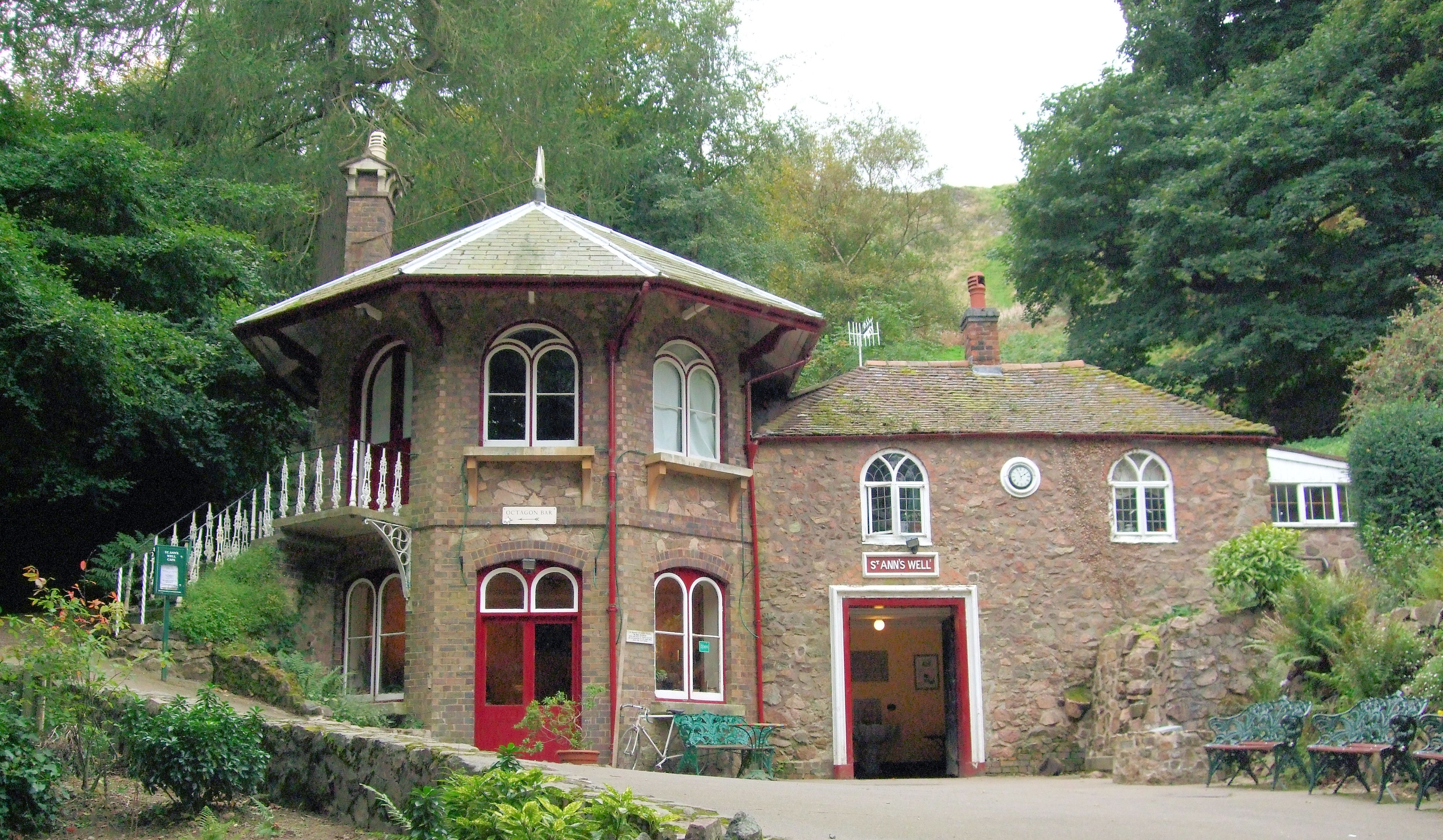
St Ann's Well and Cafe
