= WAGO 221 =

Lever connectors by WAGO GmbH

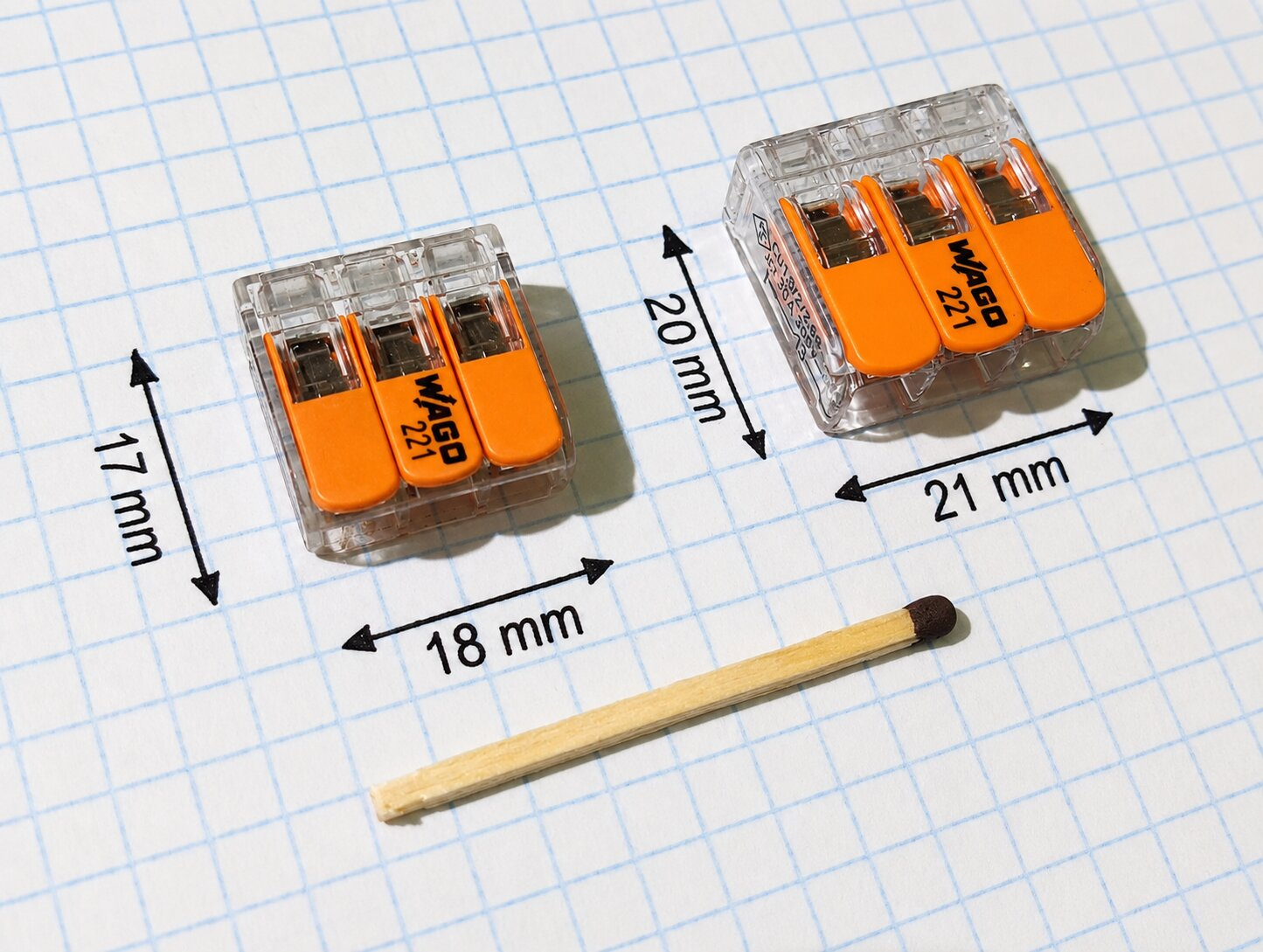
- Inception: 2014

The WAGO 221 series is a family of lever-operated splicing connectors manufactured by WAGO GmbH, a German electrical components manufacturer, for joining electrical conductors in low-voltage (up to 450 V / 600 V depending on certification) electrical installations. The connectors use WAGO's CAGE CLAMP spring pressure connection technology, which, according to the manufacturer, enables the connection of both solid and stranded conductors without the use of ferrules or screw terminals. Introduced in 2014 as the successor to the WAGO 222 series, the connectors feature a transparent housing that is 40% smaller than that of their predecessors. The series is available in several configurations and conductor size ranges, including Standard, Green Range and Ex e variants.

It has several certifications: UL (American), CSA (Canadian), ENEC (European), and PSE (Japanese)

== Design ==
The connector has levers, 2 test ports, and the logo.

The connector features a transparent housing, allowing visual inspection of the conductor insertion depth and enabling users to verify that each conductor has been fully inserted into the clamping point. According to WAGO, the housing was redesigned to be 40% smaller than that of the preceding 222 series while retaining the same operating principle. The housing material is transparent polycarbonate, whereas nylon is used for the opaque levers.

=== Housing sizes ===
The connectors are available in two housing sizes corresponding to different conductor size ranges. The smaller housing is intended for conductors with cross-sectional areas up to 4 mm² and accepts fine-stranded conductors from 0.14 mm² as well as solid and stranded conductors from 0.2 mm². The larger housing is designed for conductors with cross-sectional areas up to 6 mm² and accommodates all conductor types from 0.5 to 6 mm².

Mechanism: lever, spring, copper busbar, and test contact.

=== Conductors ===
The connectors are designed for use with copper conductors. According to WAGO, aluminum conductors can also be connected using WAGO Alu-Plus Contact Paste, eliminating the need for dedicated Al/Cu connectors in building installations.

=== Levers ===
The operating levers are located on the top of the connector. Their colour depends on the product variant and is described in the Variants section. The levers face the same side as the conductor entry openings.

=== Test ports ===
Each connector is provided with two test ports for multimeter probes. One test port is located on the conductor entry side of the connector, above the conductor entry openings and beneath one of the operating levers. The second test port is located on the opposite side of the connector.

=== Housing layouts ===
The series is available in two housing layouts. In the standard layout, all conductor entry openings are located on the same side of the connector. In the linear layout, conductor entry openings are located on opposite sides, allowing one conductor to be inserted from each side.

=== Logo ===
One of the operating levers is marked with the WAGO logo and the series designation "221". The transparent side walls are molded with product markings, including electrical ratings and certification information according to different standards, with different markings provided on each side of the housing.

== Variants ==
The WAGO 221 series is available in Standard, Green Range, and Ex e variants. In addition to the conventional side-entry design, selected Standard and Green Range models are also available in an inline configuration.

Green Range variants are manufactured using recycled and bio-circular materials while retaining the same technical characteristics as the corresponding standard models. According to WAGO, the operating levers are made from material derived by at least 27% from recycled PET bottles, while the housing contains up to 77% bio-circular material derived from waste sources such as used cooking oil and animal fats. The electrical contacts and spring components are identical to those used in the standard variants.

Ex e variants are intended for use in hazardous locations requiring the Ex e (increased safety) type of protection. Compared with the standard and Green Range variants, which have a maximum operating temperature of 85 °C, Ex e variants are rated for operation at temperatures up to 105 °C.

0.14 - 4 mm² models
Model	Ports	Rated current and voltage UL / ENEC	Variant
221-412	2	20 A / 32 A 600 V / 450 V	Standard
221-413	3	20 A / 32 A 600 V / 450 V	Standard
221-415	5	20 A / 32 A 600 V / 450 V	Standard
221-420	10	20 A / 32 A 600 V / 450 V	Standard
221-2401	2	inline models: transparent / white housing	Standard
221-2411	2	inline models: transparent / white housing	Standard
221-422	2	20 A / 32 A 600 V / 450 V	Green Range
221-423	3	20 A / 32 A 600 V / 450 V	Green Range
221-425	5	20 A / 32 A 600 V / 450 V	Green Range
221-430	10	20 A / 32 A 600 V / 450 V	Green Range
221-4221	2	inline models: transparent / white housing	Green Range
221-4231	2	inline models: transparent / white housing	Green Range
221-482	2	20 A / 32 A 600 V / 450 V	Ex e
221-483	3	20 A / 32 A 600 V / 450 V	Ex e
221-485	5	20 A / 32 A 600 V / 450 V	Ex e
221-490	10	20 A / 32 A 600 V / 450 V	Ex e
0.5 - 6 mm² models
221-612	2	30 A / 41 A 600 V / 450 V	Standard
221-613	3	30 A / 41 A 600 V / 450 V	Standard
221-615	5	30 A / 41 A 600 V / 450 V	Standard
221-622	2	30 A / 41 A 600 V / 450 V	Green Range
221-623	3	30 A / 41 A 600 V / 450 V	Green Range
221-625	5	30 A / 41 A 600 V / 450 V	Green Range
221-682	2	30 A / 41 A 600 V / 450 V	Ex e
221-683	3	30 A / 41 A 600 V / 450 V	Ex e
221-685	5	30 A / 41 A 600 V / 450 V	Ex e
