= Tinning =

Covering object with layer of tin

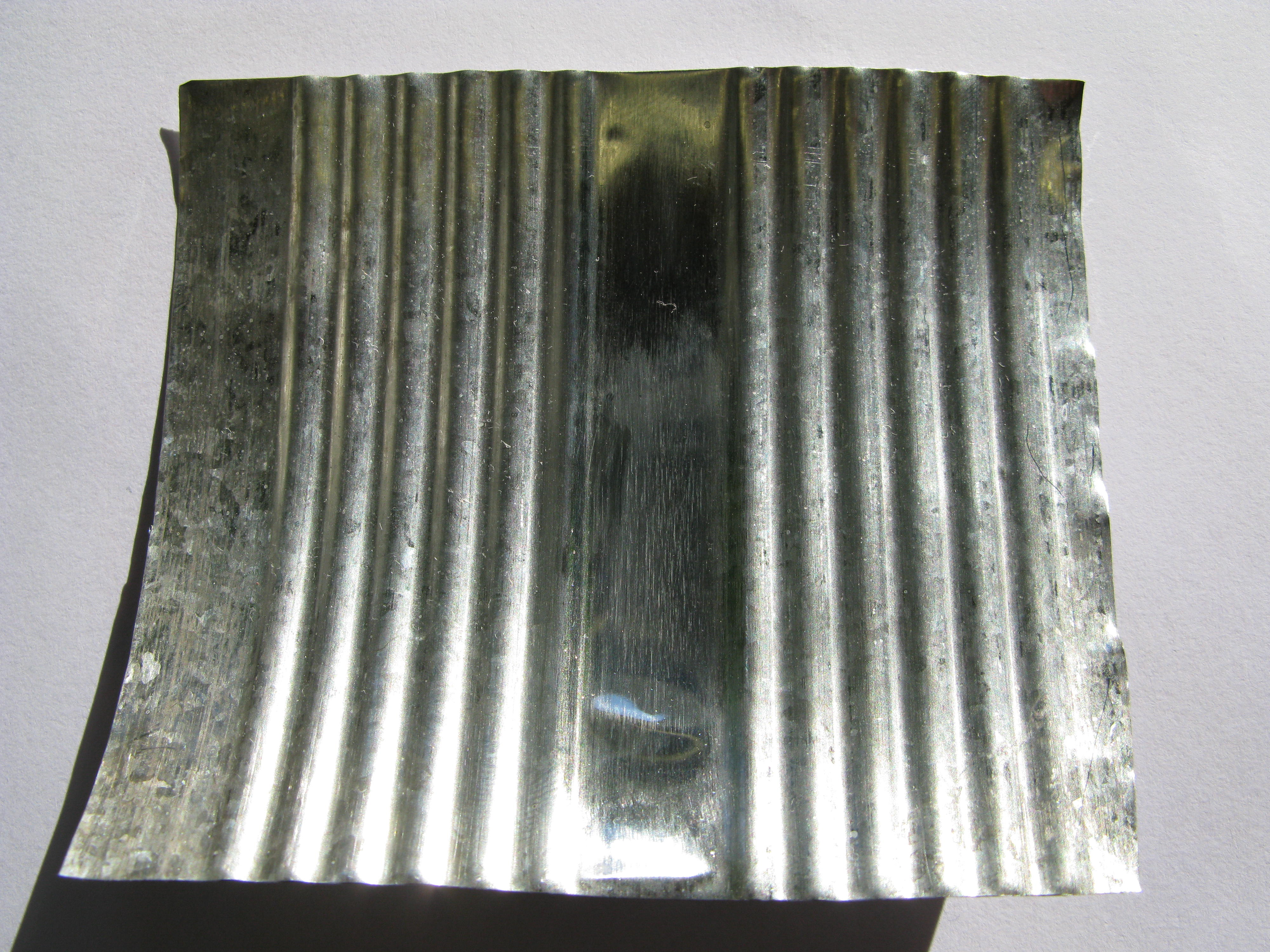
Tin layer on the inside of a tin can

Tinning is the process of thinly coating sheets of wrought iron, steel, or copper with tin, and the resulting product is known as tinplate. The term is also widely used for the different process of coating a metal with solder before soldering.

It is most often used to prevent rust, but is also commonly applied to the ends of stranded wire used as electrical conductors to prevent oxidation (which increases electrical resistance), and to keep them from fraying or unraveling when used in various wire connectors like twist-ons, binding posts, or terminal blocks, where stray strands can cause a short circuit.

While once more widely used, the primary use of tinplate now is the manufacture of tin cans. Formerly, tinplate was used for cheap pots, pans, and other holloware. This kind of holloware was also known as tinware and the people who made it were tinplate workers.

The untinned sheets employed in the manufacture are known as black plates. They are now made of steel, either Bessemer steel or open-hearth. Formerly iron was used, and was of two grades, coke iron and charcoal iron; the latter, being the better, received a heavier coating of tin, and this circumstance is the origin of the terms coke plates and charcoal plates by which the quality of tinplate is still designated, although iron is no longer used. Tinplate was consumed in enormous quantities for the manufacture of the tin cans in which preserved meat, fish, fruit, biscuits, cigarettes, and numerous other products are packed, and also for the household utensils of various kinds made by the tinsmith.

== History ==
The practice of tinning ironware to protect it against rust is an ancient one. According to Pliny the Elder tinning was invented by the Gallic Bituriges tribe (based near modern Bourges), who boiled copper objects in a tin solution in order to make them look as if they were made from silver. The first detailed account of the process appears in Zosimus of Panopolis, Book 6.62, part of a work on alchemy written in Roman Egypt around 300 AD. Aside from an attestation in 14th century England, the process is not attested again in Europe until the description in Lazarus Ercker's Das Kleine Probierbuch (1556)

The manufacture of tinplate was long a monopoly of Bohemia, but in about the year 1620 the industry spread to Saxony. Tinplate was apparently produced in the 1620s at a mill of (or under the patronage of) the Earl of Southampton, but it is not clear how long this continued.

Andrew Yarranton, an English engineer and agriculturist, and Ambrose Crowley (a Stourbridge blacksmith and father of the more famous Sir Ambrose Crowley III) were commissioned to go to Saxony and if possible discover the methods employed. They visited Dresden in 1667 and found out how it was made. In doing so, they were sponsored by various local ironmasters and people connected with the project to make the River Stour navigable. In Saxony, the plates were forged, but when they conducted experiments on their return to England, they tried rolling the iron. This led to two of the sponsors, the ironmasters Philip Foley and Joshua Newborough, erecting a new mill, Wolverley Lower Mill (or forge), in 1670. This contained three shops: one being a slitting mill, which would serve as a rolling mill, the others being forges. In 1678 one of these was making frying pans and the other drawing out blooms made in finery forges elsewhere. It is likely that the intention was to roll the plates and then finish them under a hammer, but the plan was frustrated by one William Chamberlaine renewing a patent granted to him and Dud Dudley in 1662. Yarranton described the patent as "trumped up".

The slitter at Wolverley was Thomas Cooke. Another Thomas Cooke, perhaps his son, moved to Pontypool and worked there for John Hanbury (1664–1734). According to Edward Lhuyd, by 1697, John Hanbury had a rolling mill at Pontypool for making "Pontypoole Plates" machine. This has been claimed as a tinplate works, but it was almost certainly only producing (untinned) blackplate. However, this method of rolling iron plates by means of cylinders, enabled more uniform black plates to be produced than was possible with the old plan of hammering, and in consequence the English tinplate became recognised as superior to the German.

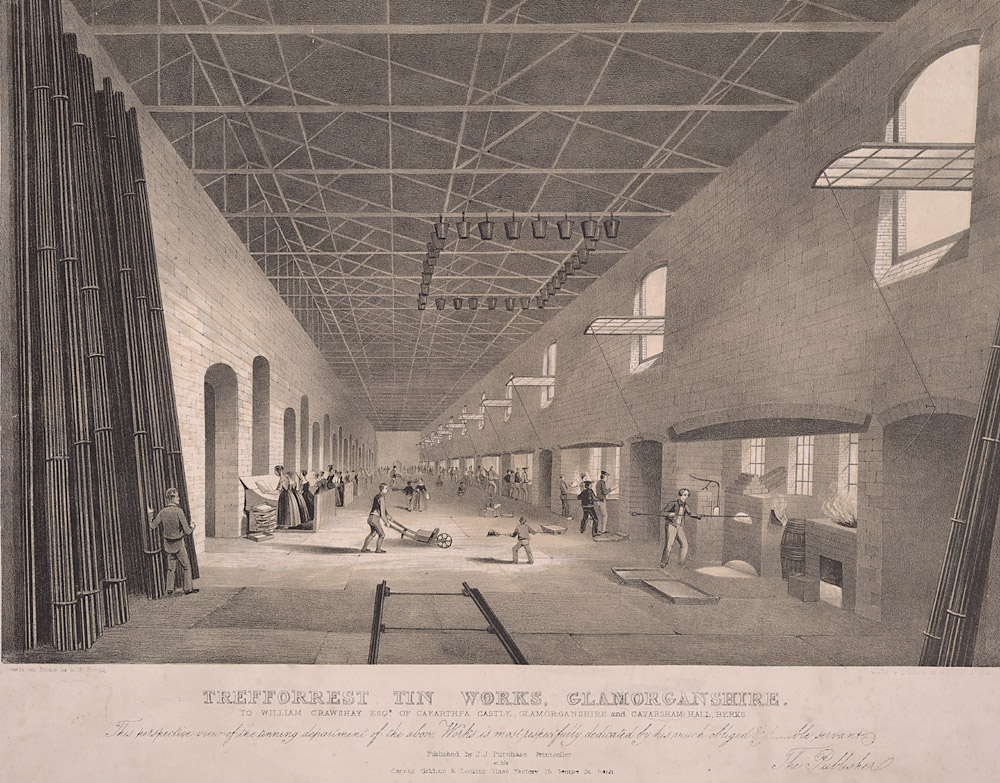
Treforest Tin Works, Glamorganshire c. 1840

Tinplate first begins to appear in the Gloucester Port Books (which record trade passing through Gloucester, mostly from ports in the Bristol Channel) in 1725. The tinplate was shipped from Newport, Monmouthshire. This immediately follows the first appearance (in French) of Réaumur's Principes de l'art de fer-blanc, and prior to a report of it being published in England.

Further mills followed a few years later, initially in many ironmaking regions in England and Wales, but later mainly in south Wales. In 1805, 80,000 boxes were made and 50,000 exported. The industry continued to spread steadily in England and especially Wales, and after 1834 its expansion was rapid, Great Britain becoming the chief source of the world's supply. In that year her total production was 180,000 boxes of 108 lb each (around 50 kg, in America a box is 100 lb), in 1848 it was 420,000 boxes, in 1860 it reached 1,700,000 boxes. But subsequently the advance was rapid, and the production reached about 2,236,000 lb in 1891. One of the greatest markets was the United States of America, but that market was cut off in 1891, when the McKinley tariff was enacted there. This caused a great retrenchment in the British industry and the emigration to America of many of those who could no longer be employed in the surviving tinplate works.

In 1891, the United States made 11,000 tons of tinplate and imported 325,100 tons, but in 1899, it made 360,900 tons, importing only 63,500 tons (mostly for re-export). British exports were further hindered by the Dingley tariff, which removed the advantage of Welsh plate on America's Pacific coast, had by 1900 increased to more than 849,000,000 lb, of which over 141,000,000 lb were terne-plates. The total imports in that year were only 135,264,881 lb. In later years, again, there was a decline in the American production, and in 1907 only 20% of the American tinplate mills were at work, while the British production reached 14 million boxes.

Despite this blow, the industry continued, but on a smaller scale. Nevertheless, there were still 518 mills in operation in 1937, including 224 belonging to Richard Thomas & Co. However the traditional 'pack mill' had been overtaken by the improved 'strip mill', of which the first in Great Britain was built by Richard Thomas & Co. in the late 1930s. Strip mills rendered the old pack mills obsolete and the last of them closed in about the 1960s.

== Plate production methods ==
=== The pack mill process ===
The pack mill process begins with a tin bar, which is a drawn flat bar that was usually purchased from an ironworks or steel works. The tin bar could be wrought iron or mild steel. The cross-section of the bar needed to be accurate in size as this dictates the length and thickness of the final plates. The bar was cut to the correct length to make the desired size plate. For instance, if a 14 in × 20 in (360 mm × 510 mm) plate is desired the tin bar is cut to a length and width that is divisible by 14 and 20. The bar is then rolled and doubled over, with the number of times being doubled over dependent on how large the tin bar is and what the final thickness is. If the starting tin bar is 20 in × 56 in (510 mm × 1,420 mm) then it must be at least finished on the fours, or doubled over twice, and if a thin gauge is required then it may be finished on the eights, or doubled over three times. The tin bar is then heated to a dull red heat and passed five or six times through the roughing rolls. Between each pass the plate is passed over (or round) the rolls, and the gap between the rolls is narrowed by means of a screw. The plate is then reheated and run through the finishing rolls.

If the plate is not finished on singles, or without doubling the plate over, it is doubled over in a squeezer. The squeezer was like a table where one half of the surface folds over on top of the other and a press flattens the doubled over plate so the rolled end will fit in the rollers. It is then reheated for another set of rolling. This is repeated until the desired geometry is reached. Note that if the plate needs to be doubled over more than once the rolled end is sheared off. The pack is then allowed to cool. When cool, the pack is sheared slightly undersized from the final dimensions and the plates separated by openers.

At this point, the plates are covered in scale and must be pickled. This involves dipping the plates in sulfuric acid for five minutes. The pickling turns the scales into a greenish-black slime which is removed via annealing. The plates are annealed for approximately 10 hours and then allowed to slowly cool. At this point the plates are known as pickled and annealed black plates. These plates were commonly sold for stamping and enameling purposes.

After this, the plates are rough and not straight, so they are cold rolled several times. The rolling lengthens the plates to their final dimension. They are then annealed again to remove any strain hardening. These plates are called black plate pickled, cold rolled, and close annealed (black plate p. cr. and ca.). To attain perfect cleanliness the plates are pickled again in a weak sulfuric acid. Finally they are rinsed and stored in water until ready to be tinned.

The tinning set consists of at least one pot of molten tin, with a zinc chloride flux on top, and a grease pot. The flux dries the plate and prepares it for the tin to adhere. If a second tin pot is used, called the wash pot, it contains tin at a lower temperature. This is followed by the grease pot, which contains oil and a tinning machine. The tinning machine has two small rollers that are spring-loaded together so that when the tinned plate is inserted the rolls squeeze off any excess tin. The springs on the tinning machine can be set to different forces to give different thicknesses of tin. Finally, the oil is cleaned off with fine bran and dusted clean.

What is described here is the process as employed during the 20th century. The process grew somewhat in complexity over time, as it was found that the inclusion of additional procedures improved quality. The practice of hot rolling and then cold rolling evidently goes back to the early days, as the Knight family's tinplate works had (from its foundation in about 1740) two rolling mills, one at Bringewood (west of Ludlow) which made blackplate, and the other the tin mill at Mitton (now part of Stourport, evidently for the later stages.

==== The strip mill ====
Early hot rolling strip mills did not produce strip suitable for tinning, but in 1929 cold rolling began to be used to reduce the gauge further, which made tinning achievable. The plate was then tinned using the process outlined above.

In modern tinplate production, hot rolled steel strip is cold rolled to the required thickness and then annealed to restore ductility lost through work hardening. A subsequent temper rolling operation improves the strip's flatness and changes its surface roughness and forming properties before coating.

== Tinning processes ==
There are two processes for the tinning of the black plates: hot-dipping and electroplating.

=== Hot-dipping ===
Hot tin-dipping is the process of immersing a part into a bath of pure molten tin at a temperature greater than 450 °F or 232 °C.

Tinplate made via hot-dipped tin plating is made by cold rolling steel or iron, pickling to remove any scale, annealing to remove any strain hardening, and then coating it with a thin layer of tin. Originally this was done by producing individual or small packs of plates, which became known as the pack mill process. In the late 1920s strip mills began to replace pack mills, because they could produce the raw plates in larger quantities and more economically.

=== Electroplating ===
In electroplating, the item to be coated is placed into a container containing a solution of one or more tin salts. The item is connected to an electrical circuit, forming the cathode (negative) of the circuit while an electrode typically of the same metal to be plated forms the anode (positive). When an electric current is passed through the circuit, metal ions in the solution are attracted to the item. To produce a smooth, shiny surface, the electroplated sheet is then briefly heated above the melting point of tin. Most of the tin-plated steel made today is then further electroplated with a very thin layer of chromium to prevent dulling of the surface from oxidation of the tin.

== Alternatives ==
- Terne-plate is a similar product to tinplate, but the bath is not of tin, but of tin and lead mixed, the latter metal constituting from 7.59% of the whole. The name derives from "terne", meaning dull or tarnish. Terne-plates began to be produced in England about the middle of the 19th century, and became widely employed in the United States for roofing purposes. Other applications included fuel tanks and gas meters. The last Terne-plate mill in Brockmoor, West Midlands in the UK was closed in 2006.
- For many purposes, tinplate has been replaced by galvanised (zinc-coated) vessels - though not for cooking, as zinc can be toxic. A Zinc protects iron electrolytically, that is, the zinc will oxidise and turn to a white powder to preserve the iron, whereas tin will only protect the iron if the tin-surface remains unbroken, as it electrolytically cannibalises unprotected iron to preserve itself.

== See also ==
- Blackplate
- Kalai (process), a form of tinning practiced in India
- Plating for other processes for plating metals
- Sherardizing
- Tinsmith
- Tinware
- Black oxide
