= Blackplate =

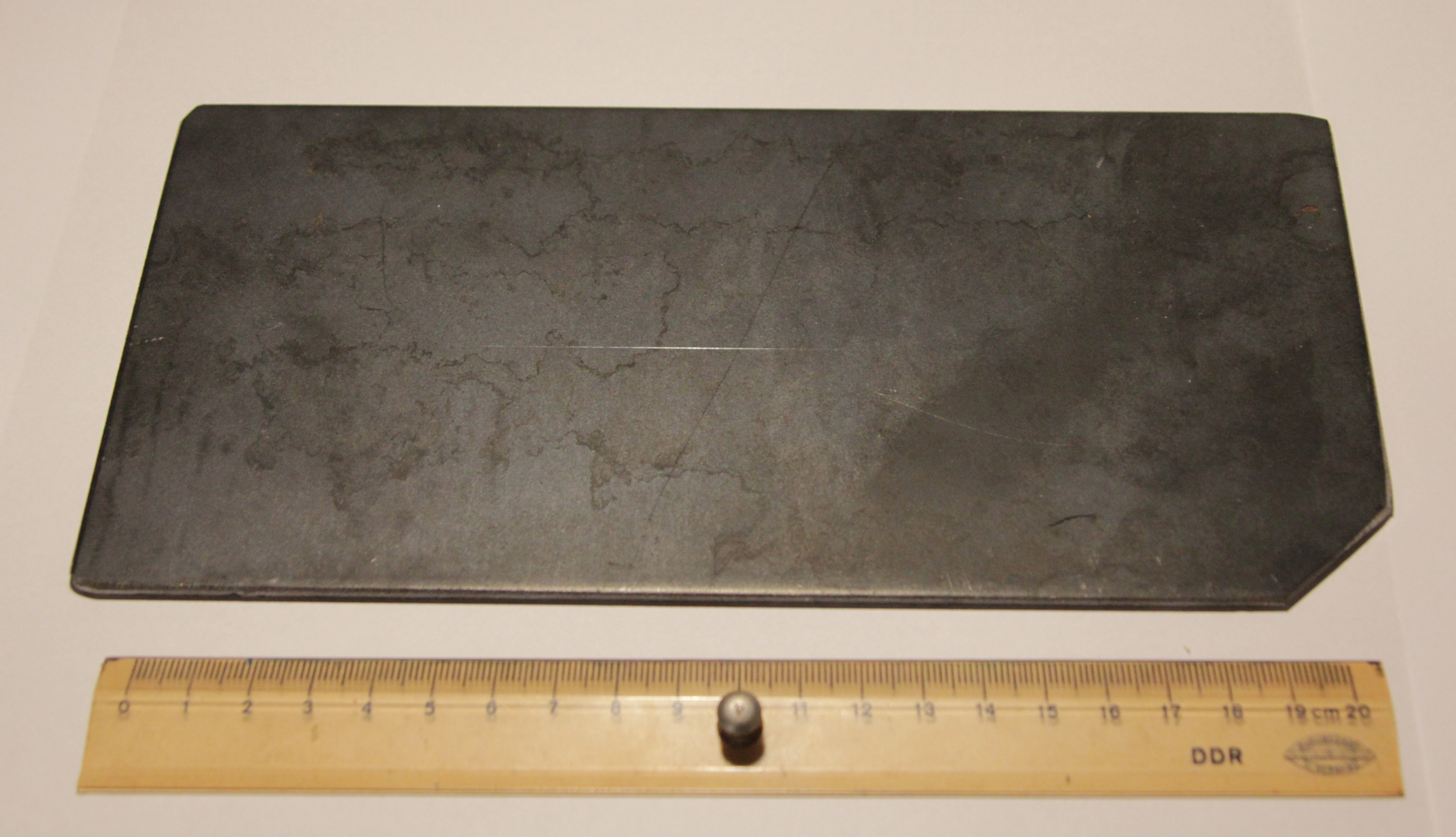
A piece of cut blackplate, 4 mm thick

Blackplate is hot rolled or cold rolled, non-descaled sheet steel or sheet iron.

== Manufacture and properties ==
Blackplate is made of non-tinned iron or steel and is annealed on open flames or in an annealing box. Its dark appearance is caused by its reaction with the surrounding air. During warm rolling, blackplate can be manufactured to thicknesses of 1.5 mm or more. Cold rolled blackplate, by contrast, can be made thinner – thicknesses of 0.4 to 1.5 mm being attainable – and produces better surface qualities.

== See also ==
- Tinplate
