= Tinware =

Objects made of tin

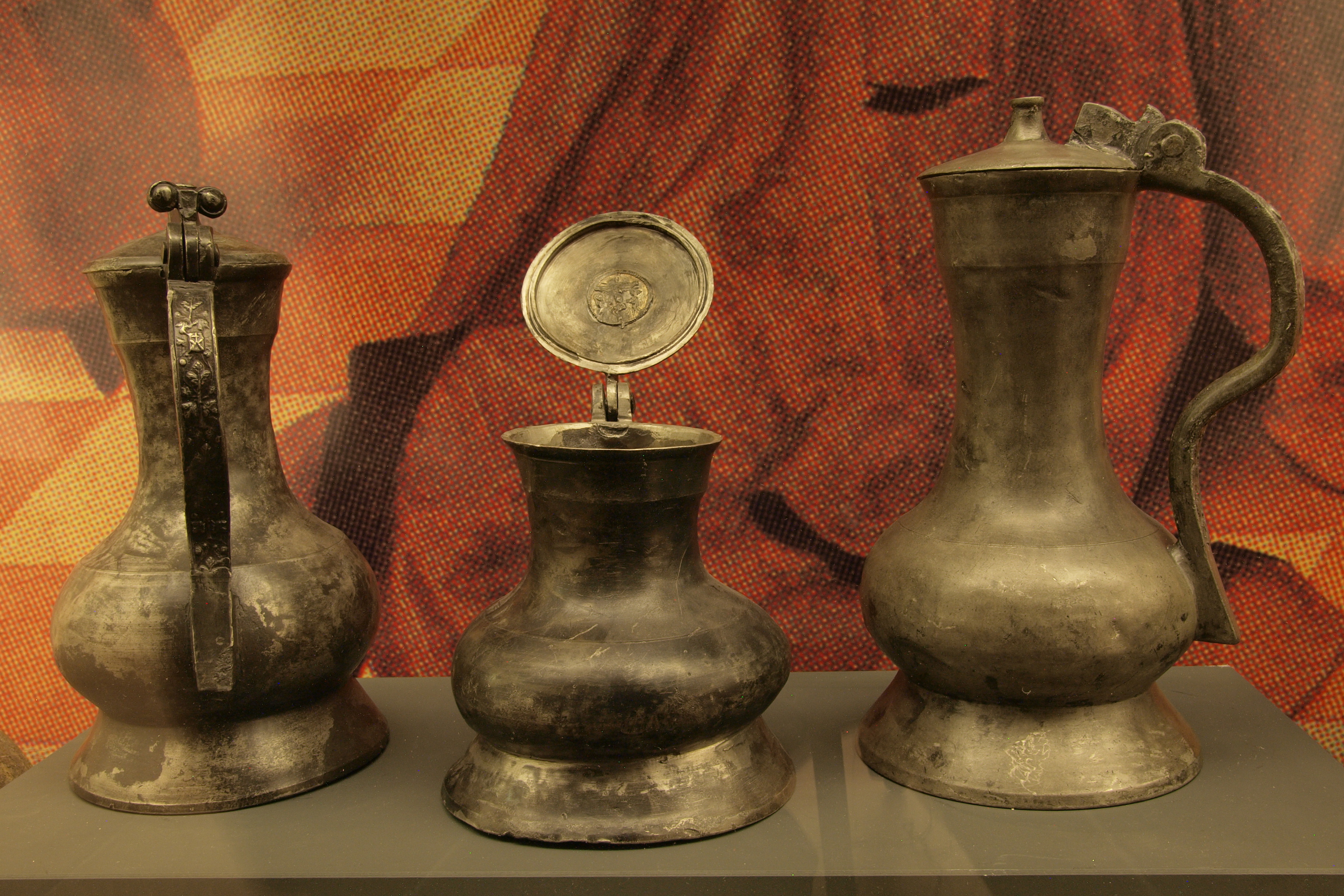
Three decorative tin cans of the 15th century at Museum für Hamburgische Geschichte

Tinware is any item made of prefabricated tinplate. Usually tinware refers to kitchenware made of tinplate, often crafted by tinsmiths. Many cans used for canned food are tinware as well. Something that is tinned after being shaped and fabricated is not considered tinware. Similar industrial products are called tin-sheet products or tinwork.

== Properties ==
Tinware is strong, easily shaped, solderable, and is non-toxic. In addition, it has a good appearance which can be further enhanced by lacquering it. Of extreme importance is its property of corrosion resistance, especially against attack by food products. These properties are due to the properties of tinplate, as tinware is made of tinplate.

== Tinplate ==
Tinplate originated in Bohemia in the Middle Ages. Sources differ as to when this happened, ranging from the late thirteenth century to the fourteenth century. The technique for how to make tinplate spread to nearby regions of Germany, and by the sixteenth century Germany was the only source of tinplate in Europe. Tinsmiths throughout Europe were dependent on German suppliers of tinplate, and when events such as the Thirty Years War interrupted tinplate production, tinwares became much more expensive. This caused many European nations, including Great Britain, to attempt to start tinplate manufacturing industries.

Successful creation of a non-German tinplate industry was hampered by both technical difficulties and the cheapness of German tinplate. Though there was a widely acclaimed expedition by Andrew Yarranton assisted in the transfer of technical knowledge, it was not until innovations like the water-powered rolling mill founded by Major Hanbury in 1728 that a successful English tinplate industry was created.

Tinplate became a British dominated industry until 1890, with an output exceeding 13 million boxes of plate, of which 70% were exported to the United States. This may help explain why the United States passed the McKinley Tariff bill, which placed a tariff of 2.2 cents per pound on tinplate. After this tariff, and with other causes, the US tinplate industry became the largest in the world.

== History of Tinware in the United States ==
Tinware production in the United States is widely acclaimed to have started when a Scottish immigrant named Edward Pattison settled in Berlin, Hartford County, Connecticut. His tinware goods became extremely popular due to their ease of use and ease of cleaning, and to help fulfill tinware orders he took on apprentices, which later made Berlin, Connecticut, the center of tinware manufacturing in the American Colonies.

During the Industrial Revolution, many inventors turned their attention to tinware. A good example of this is the invention of the circular shears by Calvin Whiting in 1804. Tinware making tools and inventions of the Industrial Revolution can be found at the Tinsmith Museum of America.

Tinware was often sold by traveling salesmen called Yankee Peddlers. These Yankee Peddlers were both employees of tinware shops and independent. Often, tinware was traded for “Truck”, or bartered items, which were sold at the tinware shop. In fact, it was often preferable for Yankee Peddlers to get truck, as written by Harvey Filley in 1822, “I don’t take but a little cash when I can get truck, for it is better these times than cash. Most all the truck is in demand, more can be made by having quantities and knowing the market.”

== Applications of Tinware ==
Most kitchenware items that are made of aluminum, stainless steel and plastic in the 20th and 21st century were made of tinware in the 18th and 19th century. Its uses range from ale tasters and coffee pots to cookie cutters and boxes. There is an advertisement for tinware posted by Thomas Passmore on November 30, 1793, in the Federal Gazette (Philadelphia) that is unique because of the alphabetical arrangement of his tinware goods. 19 letters of the alphabet are represented in this list, showcasing the astounding variety of tinware goods. Tinware was featured prominently in the 1897 Sears Roebuck and Co. Catalogue, including many pots, pails, pans, and snuff boxes to name a few.

However, since aluminum and plastic have become affordable in the 20th century, most kitchenware is now not made of tinware. Tin cans still remain as a major commodity. In 1970 there was an annual production of 12 to 13 million tons of tinplate, of which 90% were used to manufacture packaging like tin cans.
