= WAGO =

WAGO may refer to:

- WAGO GmbH & Co. KG, a German manufacturing company
- WAGO (FM), a radio station (88.7 FM) licensed to Snow Hill, North Carolina, United States
- Wago (和語), native Japanese vocabulary
- Wago, Icelandic music band
