= Chocbox =

Type of enclosure for electrical connections

Chocbox is a patented plastic box for safely enclosing electrical connections made with screw connector strips. It was invented by entrepreneur Peter Moule, who appeared on the BBC television programme Dragons' Den in 2007. He secured a deal with two "dragons", Duncan Bannatyne and James Caan, for £150,000 funding and soon made a deal for sales worth £25 million. Bannatyne describes Chocbox as one of his best investments from the show.
