= Tinplate =

Sheets of wrought iron or steel, thinly coated with tin

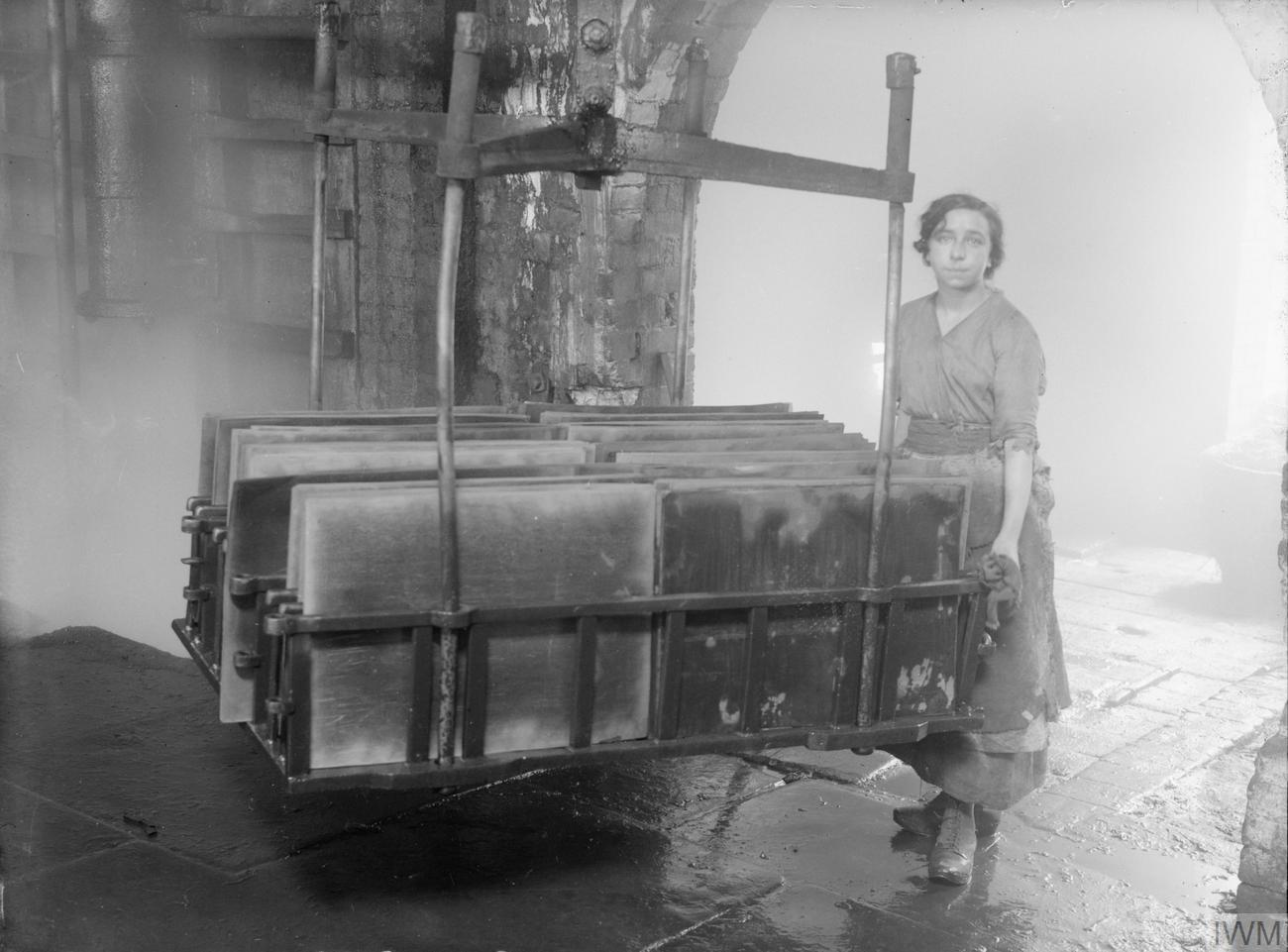
A worker pickling tin in a tin factory in South Wales during World War I

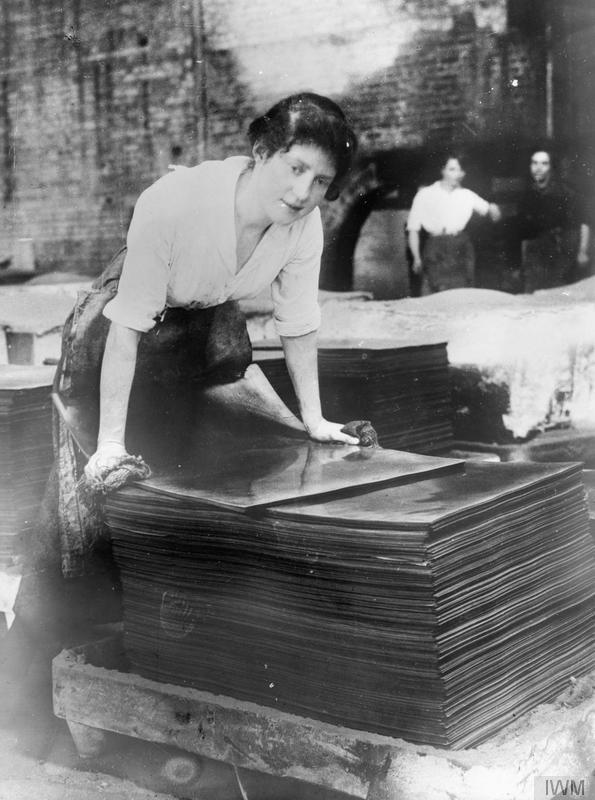
A worker removes tin plates from an annealing stand in a South Wales factory during World War I

Tinplate consists of sheets of steel coated with a thin layer of tin to impede rusting. Before the advent of cheap mild steel, the backing metal (known as "backplate") was wrought iron. While once more widely used, the primary use of tinplate now is the manufacture of tin cans.

In the tinning process, tinplate is made by rolling the steel (or formerly iron) in a rolling mill, removing any mill scale by pickling it in acid and then coating it with a thin layer of tin. Plates were once produced individually (or in small groups) in what became known as a pack mill. In the late 1920s pack mills began to be replaced by strip mills which produced larger quantities more economically.

Formerly, tinplate was used for tin ceiling, and holloware (cheap pots and pans), also known as tinware. The people who made tinware (metal spinning) were tinplate workers.

For many purposes, tinplate has been replaced by galvanised metal, the base being treated with a zinc coating. It is suitable in many applications where tinplate was formerly used, although not for cooking vessels, or in other high temperature situations—when heated, fumes from zinc oxide are given off; exposure to such gases can produce toxicity syndromes such as metal fume fever. The zinc layer prevents the iron from rusting through sacrificial protection with the zinc oxidizing instead of the iron, whereas tin will only protect the iron if the tin surface remains unbroken.

== History of production processes and markets ==
The practice of tin mining likely began circa 3000 B.C. in Western Asia, British Isles and Europe. Tin was an essential ingredient of bronze production during the Bronze Age. The practice of tinning ironware to protect it against rust is an ancient one. This may have been the work of the whitesmith. This was done after the article was fabricated, whereas tinplate was tinned before fabrication. Tinplate was apparently produced in the 1620s at a mill of (or under the patronage of) the Earl of Southampton, but it is not clear how long this continued.

The first production of tinplate was probably in Bohemia, from where the trade spread to Saxony, and was well-established there by the 1660s. Andrew Yarranton and Ambrose Crowley (a Stourbridge blacksmith and father of the more famous Sir Ambrose) visited Dresden in 1667 and learned how it was made. In doing so, they were sponsored by various local ironmasters and people connected with the project to make the river Stour navigable. In Saxony, the plates were forged, but when they conducted experiments on their return to England, they tried rolling the iron. This led to the ironmasters Philip Foley and Joshua Newborough (two of the sponsors) in 1670 erecting a new mill, Wolverley Lower Mill (or forge) in Worcestershire. This contained three shops, one being a slitting mill (which would serve as a rolling mill), and the others were forges. In 1678 one of these was making frying pans and the other drawing out blooms made in finery forges elsewhere. It is likely that the intention was to roll the plates and then finish them under a hammer, but the plan was frustrated by William Chamberlaine renewing a patent granted to him and Dud Dudley in 1662.

The slitter at Wolverley was Thomas Cooke. Another Thomas Cooke, perhaps his son, moved to Pontypool and worked there for John Hanbury. He had a slitting mill there and was also producing iron plates called 'Pontpoole plates'. Edward Lhuyd reported the existence of this mill in 1697. This has been claimed as a tinplate works, but it was almost certainly only producing (untinned) backplate.

Tinplate first begins to appear in the Gloucester Port Books (which record trade passing through Gloucester), mostly from ports in the Bristol Channel in 1725. The tinplate was shipped from Newport, Monmouthshire. (Note: Data extracted from Wanklyn et al. (1996).) This immediately follows the first appearance (in French) of Reamur's Principes de l'art de fer-blanc, and prior to a report of it being published in England.

Further mills followed a few years later, initially in many iron-making regions in England and Wales, but later mainly in south Wales, most notably the Melingriffith Tin Plate Works, Whitchurch, Cardiff, which was founded some time before 1750. In 1805, 80,000 boxes were made and 50,000 exported. The industry continued to grow until 1891. One of the greatest markets was the United States, but that market was cut off in 1891 when the McKinley tariff was enacted. This caused a great retrenchment in the British industry and the emigration to America of many of those were no longer employed in the surviving tinplate works.

Despite this blow, the industry continued, but on a smaller scale. There were 518 mills in operation in 1937, including 224 belonging to Richard Thomas & Co. The traditional 'pack mill' had been overtaken by the improved 'strip mill', of which the first in Great Britain was built by Richard Thomas & Co. in the late 1930s. Strip mills rendered the old pack mills obsolete and the last of them closed circa the 1960s.

=== Pack mill process ===
The raw material was bar iron, or (from the introduction of mild steel in the late 19th century), a bar of steel. This was drawn into a flat bar (known as a tin bar) at the ironworks or steel works where it was made. The cross-section of the bar needed to be accurate in size as this would be the cross-section of the pack of plates made from it. The bar was cut to the correct length (being the width of the plates) and heated. It was then passed four or five times through the rolls of the rolling mill, to produce a thick plate about 30 inches long. Between each pass the plate is passed over (or round) the rolls, and the gap between the rolls is narrowed by means of a screw.

This was then rolled until it had doubled in length. The plate was then folded in half ('doubled') using a doubling shear, which was like a table where one half of the surface folds over on top of the other. It is then put into a furnace to be heated until it is well 'soaked'. This is repeated until there is a pack of 8 or 16 plates. The pack is then allowed to cool. When cool, the pack was sheared (using powered shears) and the plates separated by 'openers' (usually women). Defective plates were discarded, and the rest passed to the pickling department.

In the pickling department, the plates were immersed in baths of acid (to remove scale, i.e., oxide), then in water (washing them). After inspection they were placed in an annealing furnace, where they were heated for 10–14 hours. This was known as 'black pickling' and 'black annealing'. After being removed they were allowed to cool for up to 48 hours. The plates were then rolled cold through highly polished rolls to remove any unevenness and give them a polished surface. They were then annealed again at a lower temperature and pickled again, this being known as 'white annealing' and 'white pickling'. They were then washed and stored in slightly acid water (where they would not rust) awaiting tinning.

The tinning set consisted of two pots with molten tin (with flux on top) and a grease pot. The flux dries the plate and prepares it for the tin to adhere. The second tin pot (called the wash pot) had tin at a lower temperature. This is followed by the grease pot (containing an oil), removing the excess tin. Then follow cleaning and polishing processes. Finally, the tinplates were packed in boxes of 112 sheets ready for sale. Single plates were 20 by 14 inches (51 cm × 36 cm); doubles twice that. A box weighed approximately a hundredweight (cwt; 112 pounds or 51 kilograms). (Note: What is described here is the process as employed during the 20th century. The process grew somewhat in complexity with the passage of time, as gradually it was found that the inclusion of additional procedures improved quality. The practice of hot rolling and then cold rolling evidently goes back to the early days, as the Knight family's tinplate works had (from its foundation in about 1740) two rolling mills, one at Bringewood (west of Ludlow) which made backplate, and the other the tin mill at Mitton (now part of Stourport), evidently for the later stages.: For more on the Knight tinplate works, see Ince (1991).)

=== Strip mill process ===
The strip mill was a major innovation, with the first being erected at Ashland, Kentucky in 1923. This provided a continuous process, eliminating the need to pass the plates over the rolls and to double them. At the end the strip was cut with a guillotine shear or rolled into a coil. Early – hot rolling – strip mills did not produce strip suitable for tinplate, but in 1929 cold rolling began to be used to reduce the gauge further. The first strip mill in Great Britain was opened at Ebbw Vale in 1938 with an annual output of 200,000 imperial tons (203,210 tonnes or 224,000 short tons).

The strip mill had several advantages over pack mills:

- It was cheaper due to having all parts of the process, starting with blast furnaces, on the same site.
- Softer steel could be used.
- Larger sheets could be produced at lower cost; this reduced cost and enabled tinplate and steel sheet to be used for more purposes.
- It was capital-intensive, rather than labour-intensive.

== See also ==
- Plating for other processes for plating metals.
- Tinsmith
- Tinware
- Terne plate, a cheaper version, but not food-safe, using a mixture of lead and tin.

== Notes ==
=== Sources ===
- Brown, P. J. (1988). "Andrew Yarranton and the British tinplate industry". Historical Metallurgy. 22 (1): 42–48.
- Giumlia-Mair, Alessandra; Lo Schiavo, Fulvia, eds. (2003). Le problème de l'étain á l'origine de la métallurgie – The problem of early tin. Actes du XIVème Congrès UISPP, Université de Liège, Belgique, 2–8 Septembre 2001; section 11, âge du Bronze en Europe et en Méditerranée; colloque 11.2 [Acts of the XIVth UISPP Congress, University of Liège, Belgium, 2–8 September 2001; Section 11. Bronze Age in Europe and the Mediterranean, Symposium 11.2] (in French and English). Oxford: Archaeopress. ISBN 9781841715643. 16 papers (13 in English, 3 in French):
  - Cierny, J.; Weisgerber, G. (2003). "Bronze Age tin mines in Central Asia". In Alessandra Giumlia-Mair; Fulvia Lo Schiavo (eds.). The Problem of Early Tin. pp. 23–31 (in English).
  - Dayton, J. E. (2003). "The problem of tin in the ancient world (part 2)". In Alessandra Giumlia-Mair; Fulvia Lo Schiavo (eds.). The Problem of Early Tin. pp. 165–170 (in English).
  - Valera, R. G.; Valera, P. G. (2003). "Tin in the Mediterranean area: History and geology". In Alessandra Giumlia-Mair; Fulvia Lo Schiavo (eds.). The Problem of Early Tin. pp. 3–14 (in English).
- Greene, Miranda (March 2015) [First published 2005], "The Knight family and the British iron industry", in Herefordshire Archaeology (ed.), Herefordshire Through Time, Herefordshire Council, archived from the original on 19 April 2024
- King, P. W. (1988). "Wolverley Lower Mill and the beginnings of the tinplate industry". Historical Metallurgy. 22 (2): 104–113.
- Minchinton, W. W. (1957). The British tinplate industry: A history. Oxford: Clarendon Press.
- Reutter, Mark (1988). Sparrows Point: Making Steel—the Rise and Ruin of American Industrial Might. University of Illinois Press. ISBN 9780671553357.
- Schubert, H. R. (1955). History of the British Iron and Steel Industry from c. 450 B.C. to A.D. 1775. London: Routledge & Kegan Paul.
- Wanklyn, M. D. G; Wakelin, P.; Hussey, D.; Milne, G. (March 1996), Database: Gloucester Port Books, 1575–1765, Colchester, UK: University of Essex; UK Data Archive; University of Wolverhampton, doi:10.5255/UKDA-SN-3218-1, Catalogue record: [computer file on CD-ROM]. Gloucestershire Heritage catalogue record
