= WAGO GmbH =

German manufacturing company

WAGO
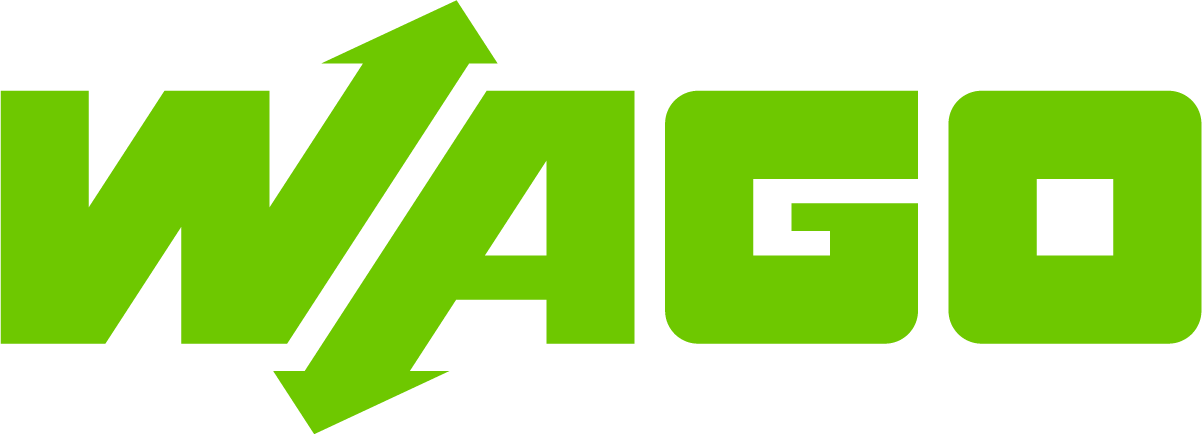
- Type: Private
- Industry: Automation, Electrical technology
- Founded: 27 April 1951
- Headquarters: Minden, Germany
- Key people: Björn Twiehaus (CEO), Jürgen Koopsingraven (CFO)
- Revenue: EUR1.34 billion (2025)
- Number of employees: 9,000
- Website: www.wago.com

WAGO GmbH & Co. KG (/ˈvɑːˌɡoʊ/, German pronunciation: [ˈvaːˌɡoː]) is a German company based in Minden, Germany, that manufactures components for electrical connection technology, interface electronics as well as systems and electronic components for automation technology. Founded in 1951, WAGO pioneered spring-clamp connection technology and developed the Cage Clamp terminal block in 1977, which later became an industry standard. The company is best known for its spring-clamp wire connectors, particularly the 222 series and its successor, the 221 series.

== History ==
=== 1950s ===
WAGO was founded on April 27, 1951, as WAGO Klemmenwerk GmbH in Minden, after brothers-in-law Heinrich Nagel and Friedrich Hohorst purchased a patent for spring clamp technology. The company is named after the inventors Wagner and Olbricht from whom the patent (Patent No. 838778) was purchased. In the same year, WAGO presented the first spring terminals at the Hannover Messe, however, they faced less reception due to ductility problems.

=== 1960s–2000s ===
In 1961, Wolfgang Hohorst, son of the founder Hohorst, joined the company. At that time, the company had 20 employees. In 1966, the company changed the material of the terminal housings (from thermoset to Polyamide 6,6) and developed additional components such as connectors and solderable terminals for printed circuit boards, which enabled the company to enter the lighting industry. A few years later, in 1973, WAGO introduced the box terminal for use in electrical installations, which was the first spring-loaded terminal to be certified by VDE. In 1975, the English company Bowthorpe Electric acquired a majority stake in WAGO.

In 1977, the company developed the spring-cage terminal block under the product name Cage Clamp. This invention was also the basis for the company's subsequent product groups. The cage clamp has since become an industrial standard. With the launch of the box terminal and the cage clamp, the company expanded internationally. By the mid-1990s, WAGO established subsidiaries in France, Switzerland, Austria, USA, Japan, the UK and former East Germany (Sondershausen), Czech Republic and in India. In 1994, the company revenue amounted to 204 million DM. In 1995, WAGO and Beckhoff presented a jointly developed modular I/O system at Hannover Messe, which the companies subsequently marketed independently. In 1998, Wolfgang Hohorst founded the WAGO Foundation with the goal of promoting education and training for young people interested in technology.

After the Fall of the Berlin Wall, WAGO announced that they set up a new plant in Sondershausen, Thuringia, which had a special role amongst the newly founded production sites. One year after the announcement, operations in Sondershausen first started in a rented facility; since 1993, Wago has been producing in a newly built factory. In the following years, WAGO continuously invested into expanding operations in Sondershausen, with €200 million invested and 13 expansions until 2022. In 1999, a logistics centre was established, with which customers in Central Europe would be supplied directly from Sondershausen. In 2022, WAGO announced the latest investment into the logistics centre of around €40 million.

=== 2000s–present ===
In 2003, the company shares were bought back from Spirent PLC (formerly Bowthorpe), making WAGO into a family owned business again. In the 2000s, WAGO further developed existing products, notably, they improved the miniaturisation of the picoMAX connector system in 2010, in which glass fiber-reinforced plastics PAA-GF were used. In the same year, Sven Hohorst took over the position of managing director from his father Wolfgang Hohorst. In summer 2012, WAGO expanded its headquarters investing €8 million on a development centre in Minden. In 2015, WAGO acquired a majority stake in the company M&M Software. The purchase of the previous development partner served the strategic orientation of the automation division. In the same year, WAGO generated a revenue of €718.7 million and had 5,996 employees. In 2016, WAGO's communication centre, a customer and training centre, and a new stamping plant were completed. After one and a half years of construction and a total of €53 million invested, this marked WAGO's latest investments around the headquarters in Minden. In the beginning of 2021, Sven Hohorst retired from the operational business and moved to the advisory board. He handed over management to Heiner Lang, the first managing director from outside the family. In the same year, WAGO established a business unit named Solutions, which develops customised electrical systems. The company also introduced a lever-operated inline splicing connector in the 221 series for conductors from 0.2 to 4 mm². On 15 September 2026, Björn Twiehaus succeeded Jürgen Koopsingraven as CEO, while Koopsingraven remained CFO.

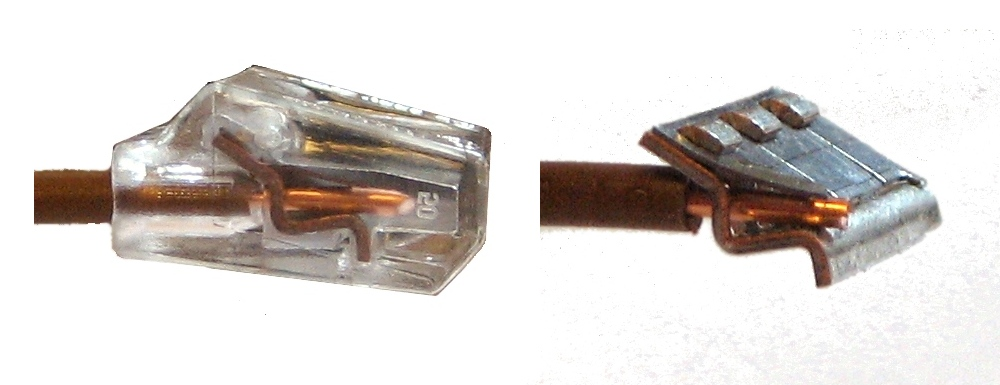
Spring clamp terminal from WAGO

== Corporate structure ==
WAGO Holding GmbH is the parent company of the WAGO group. It primarily performs holding functions for its subsidiaries and second-tier subsidiaries. WAGO GmbH & Co. KG (formerly WAGO Kontakttechnik GmbH (under Swiss law) & Co. KG) is responsible for the operating business of the group, with all its subsidiaries. WAGO is owned by the Hohorst family. The headquarters of the WAGO Group is located in Minden. The firm's German production sites are in Minden and Sondershausen. Other production sites are located in Wrocław and Wróblowice (Poland), Domdidier (Switzerland), Germantown (United States), Vadodara (India), Tianjin (China), Tokyo (Japan), Tremblay-en-France (France), Alcobendas (Spain), Querétaro (Mexico) and Rugby (United Kingdom). The group had 31 subsidiaries and was represented in more than 80 markets in 2026. In 2025, WAGO had about 9,000 employees and revenue of €1.34 billion.

== Products ==
WAGO manufactures components for electrical connection and decentralised automation technology as well as interface electronics. Interface-electronics products include signal conditioners, power-supply units and relays. Its automation products include programmable logic controllers, modular remote I/O systems, human–machine interfaces and components for industrial data communication. The 221 series is also offered in Green Range variants whose housings and levers are partly made from bio-circular or recycled plastics.

The company develops products based on spring-clamp technology. WAGO products are used in the automotive industry, building and lighting technology, rail and energy technology, the marine and offshore sector, and mechanical and plant engineering. The first product was patented in 1951 with patent No. 838778. This was a terminal with a non-self-supporting contact insert for solid conductors. The clamping force was transmitted to the insulating housing. This was followed in 1957 by a self-supporting spring terminal with helical springs for all types of conductors (Patent No. 1095914). Further important product developments include the box terminal (1973), the terminal block cage clamp (1977), the push-in cage clamp (2003), and the miniaturised picoMAX system.

Competitors in the field of terminal blocks are Harting, Phoenix Contact, and Weidmüller.

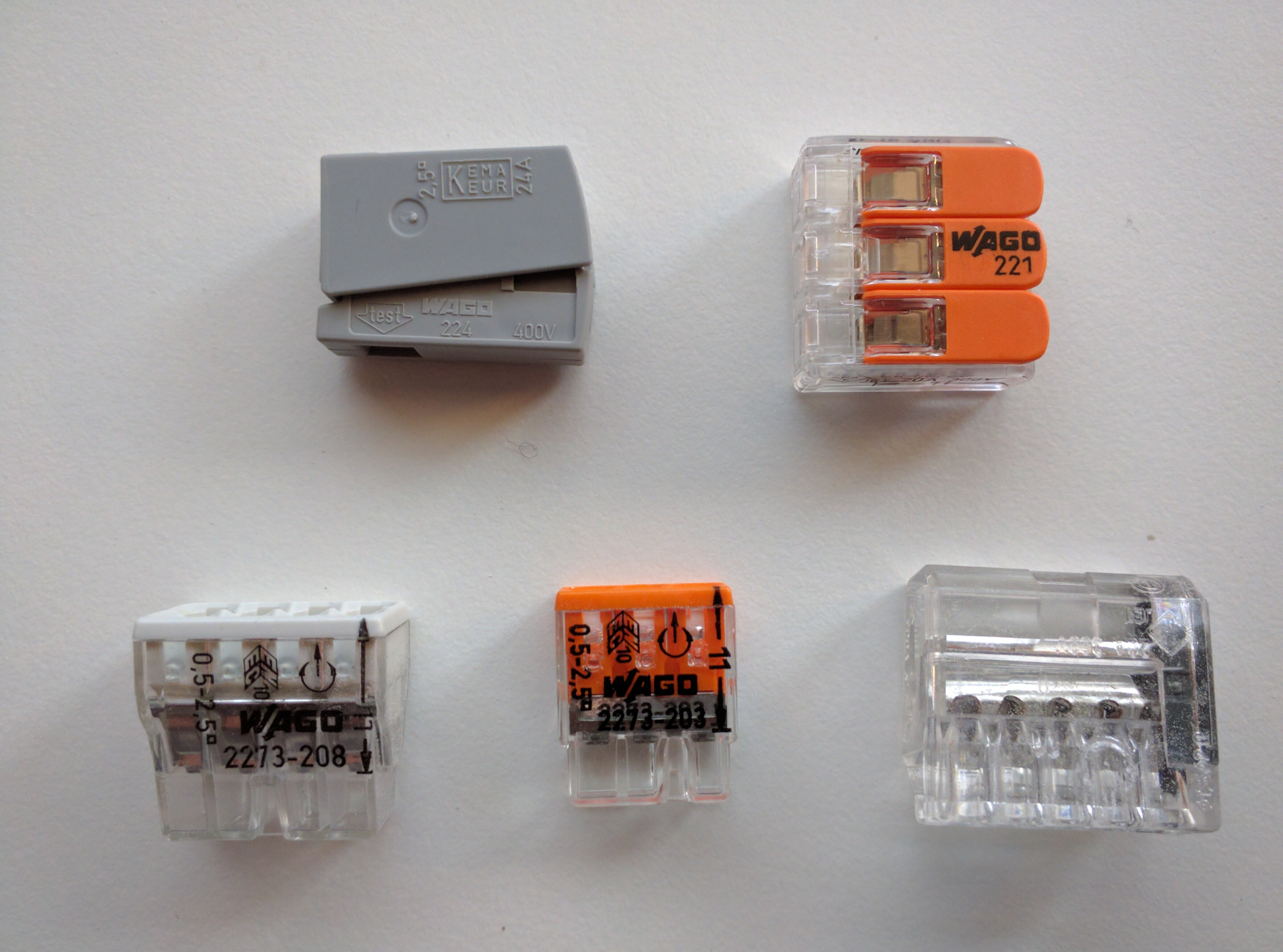
Selection of WAGO terminals
