= Electric wire ferrule =

Component used for terminating stranded electrical wires

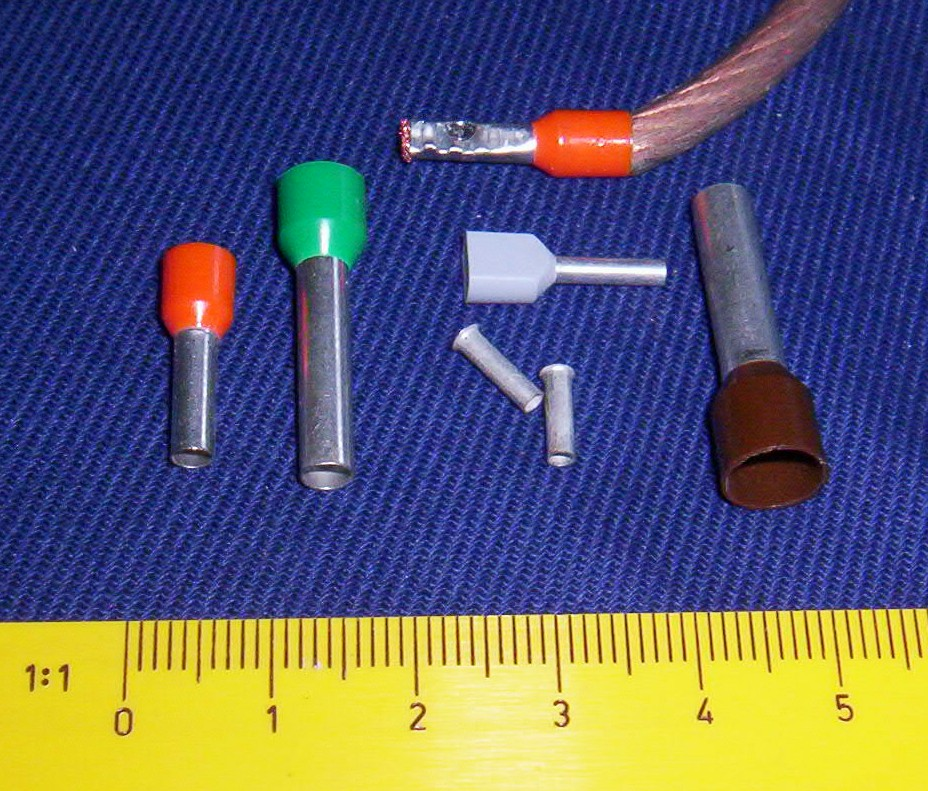
Top: wire terminating in an insulated ferrule Center: Several ferrules with colored insulation, and two uninsulated ferrules

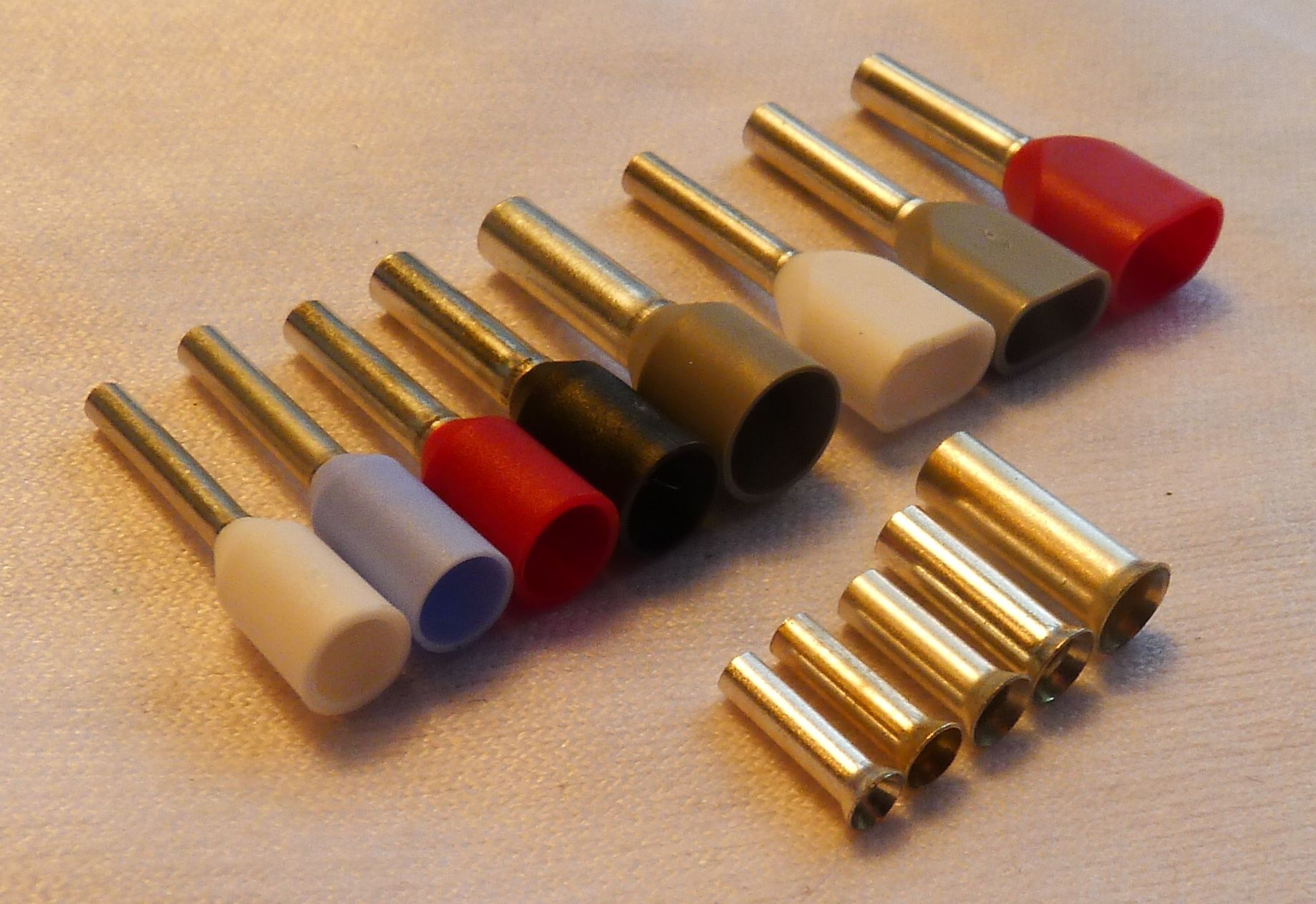
Insulated and uninsulated ferrules

An electric wire ferrule (sometimes electric end terminal) is a metal tube crimped over stranded wire to secure the strands within a screw terminal. Electrical insulation may be included to protect any exposed portion of the wire not completely inside the screw terminal post.

Stranded wire is preferred for most electrical applications because it is more reliable than solid wire. It is more flexible and durable because repeated bending will not cause it to break. Stranded wire can be more difficult to terminate, because the individual strands tend to separate after insulation is removed.

By placing the end of the stranded wire in a ferrule, the strands stay together.

== Color code ==
According to DIN 46228, color indicates the intended wire size. Some manufacturers use their own color codes that differ from the DIN.

== See also ==
- Electrical termination
- Crimp (electrical)
- Electrical connector
- Solder joint
- Wire rope § Terminations
