= ENEC Mark =

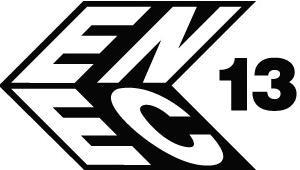
- European mark of conformity (issued by Electrosuisse SEV)
- Effective region: Europe
- Product category: Electrical, Electronic appliances
- Website: https://www.enec.com

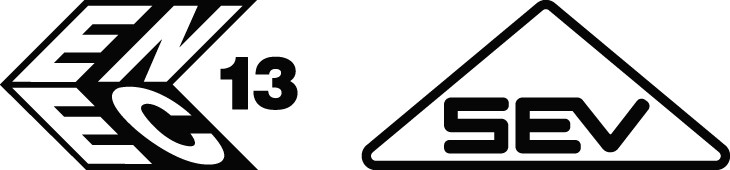
European mark of conformity (issued by Electrosuisse SEV)

ENEC is the high quality European mark for electrical products that demonstrates compliance with European safety standards.

== ENEC Description ==
ENEC is an abbreviation for "European Norms Electrical Certification".

These four letters are part of the registered trademark that demonstrate that a product has been certified by one of the national certification institutes in Europe. Today, there are 25 certification institutes (also called certification bodies) that are signatories of the agreement.

Apart from the mark itself, there are also two digits numbers that indicate which certification body has issued the ENEC certification.

The ENEC agreement was originally started with a view to providing manufacturing of luminaires with a joint European certification mark to replace all the different national marks. In 1999, the agreement was expanded to include:

- Lighting
- Components for lamp holders
- IT
- Electric office equipment
- Safety isolating transformers
- Isolating transformers and separating transformers
- Power supply units
- Switches

ENEC is a product certification type 5. In particular, this scheme includes factory inspection at the manufacturer's premises.

Established since 2010, ENEC is trying to be the standard for safety reassurance in the European Market.

The application of the ENEC Mark to an electrical product ensures that it complies with the relevant European safety standards and has to be accepted by all member states. Monitoring of product and production provides safety assurance for the lifetime of the ENEC certification.

- Household appliances, electronic equipment, lighting
- Compliance with the EU low-voltage-directive
- Reduced license costs
- Evidence in case of product liability claims

== Obtaining the ENEC certificate ==
Testing and certification according to European standards. Product manufacturing monitored by an accredited inspection division like Electrosuisse SEV, Nemko, MIRTEC S.A, TSE or an equivalent partner organization for foreign production facilities to ensure consistent product compliance.

== See also ==
- Conformance mark
- Certification mark
- CENELEC
