= Andrew Yarranton =

English civil engineer (1619–1684)

Andrew Yarranton (1619–1684) was an important English engineer in the 17th century who was responsible for making several rivers into navigable waterways.

== Biography ==
He was born at Astley, south of the town of Stourport-on-Severn in Worcestershire, and was from a yeoman family. He was apprenticed to a linen draper in Worcester circa 1632, but left after a few years to live a country life. According to John Aubrey he died violently; 'The cause of death was a beating and thrown into a tub of water'.

=== Civil War Period ===
During the English Civil War he served in the Parliamentary army rising to the rank of captain. In 1646 he became a member of the Worcester County Committee to administer "parliamentary justice" to the county and to list and fine all "delinquents" who had supported the Royalist cause. After the war, he used the arrears of military pay to speculate in forfeited crown and royalist estates.

With other officers, he set up ironworks, a blast furnace at Astley, to smelt cinders from Worcester with iron ore from the Forest of Dean, using charcoal obtained locally. Neighbouring ironmasters leased Shelsley Forge to him to discourage him from building one of his own. He probably withdrew from the iron industry after the Restoration. However he still had a share in a furnace at Sudeley near Winchcombe in 1673. Yarranton had been a leading Roundhead before the Restoration and was therefore under political suspicion afterwards. He was imprisoned several times during the 1660s, at least twice on trumped up charges.

His other achievement related to making tinplate. The Stour Navigation proprietors, and certain notable men in the local iron industry commissioned him and Ambrose Crowley to go to Saxony to find out how tinplate was made. On their return, experiments were undertaken, including rolling (which was not part of the process in Saxony). This was sufficiently successful to encourage two of the sponsors Philip Foley and Joshua Newborough to set up a mill for the process on the Stour at Wolverley.

=== Agriculture ===
Andrew Yarranton was an early and influential figure in agricultural improvement during the 17th century. Observing the detrimental effects of continuous monoculture and exhausted soils, he was a pioneer in advocating crop rotation and land rest to improve fertility. Yarranton is notably credited as one of the first promoters of clover cultivation in England, recognizing the plant’s ability to enhance soil quality and increase land value. He distributed clover seed widely among farmers in the western counties, significantly boosting agricultural productivity and encouraging the adoption of new husbandry practices throughout the country. His agricultural innovations were part of a broader vision to improve England's economy and national welfare through both agricultural and industrial advancements.

Yarranton also emphasized sensible management of meadows and pastures, advocating practices such as letting weak meadows rest as grazing land, applying dung and hay dust to restore soil vitality, and carefully planned crop sowing sequences including peas, wheat, and hay seeds. His approach reflected a holistic understanding of land stewardship aimed at sustainable productivity. These efforts placed him among the early modern agricultural reformers who laid groundwork for later systematic farming improvements, including ley farming and soil management techniques that would take a more defined shape in subsequent centuries.

His publication "The Great Improvement of Lands by Clover" in 1663 marked him as a pioneer in agricultural literature and improvement.

== Engineering ==
Yarranton is mainly remembered as a navigation engineer. His first interest in this was a proposal in 1651 to make Dick Brook navigable from the River Severn to a forge and furnace he owned on the Astley bank of the brook. In 1655 he proposed to make the River Salwarpe navigable from the Severn to Droitwich. This was partly to be financed with money raised by the town corporation, but came to nothing. However the proposal was revived, and the Rivers Stour and Salwarpe Navigation Act 1662 (14 Cha. 2. c. 14 Pr.) was obtained authorising the improvement of the Stour and Salwarpe. Droitwich Corporation renewed its agreement in 1664, to provide financial assistance to Thomas Lord Windsor (later Earl of Plymouth), who was the scheme's leading financier. However, when five of the six locks had been built the proposal was found 'not to answer' and was abandoned. A century later the Droitwich Canal was built to fulfil the same objective, primarily that of bringing coal up to Droitwich to boil brine and taking the resultant salt out.

The River Stour, Worcestershire flows through Stourbridge and Kidderminster to join the Severn at Stourport-on-Severn (which was then the hamlet of Lower Mitton). The proposal was that coal from Amblecote and Pensnett Chase should be brought down railways (known as footrayles) and loaded on to barges to transport down the river. Several attempts were made to improve the river, but each time money ran out, either before it was finished or before a trade could be got going. These lasted intermittently until 1680, the later ones being under the immediate supervision of Andrew's son Robert Yarranton. The scheme was thus ultimately a failure, but its objectives were achieved at much greater expense a century later by the Staffordshire and Worcestershire Canal and the Stourbridge Canal.

Yarranton's work on a third navigation, the River Avon, was far more successful. William Sandys had improved the river in the late 1630s, but it had passed into the hands of Willam Say (one of his financiers), who was attainted at the Restoration (thus forfeiting his property). His rights passed to James, Duke of York, later King James II, who sold them to Lord Windsor in 1664. The navigation had languished under its previous ownership and needed substantial further investment. Lord Windsor retained the Lower Avon (below Evesham) himself, but employed Yarranton to maintain it, and also to rebuild Pershore sluice (i.e. lock). The Upper Avon Navigation (above Evesham) needed much more to be spent on it, and he took partners, including Yarranton. Within a couple of years, the river was again navigable, and remained so for over two centuries above Evesham, and ever since below that town.
