= St Peter's Church, Kinver =

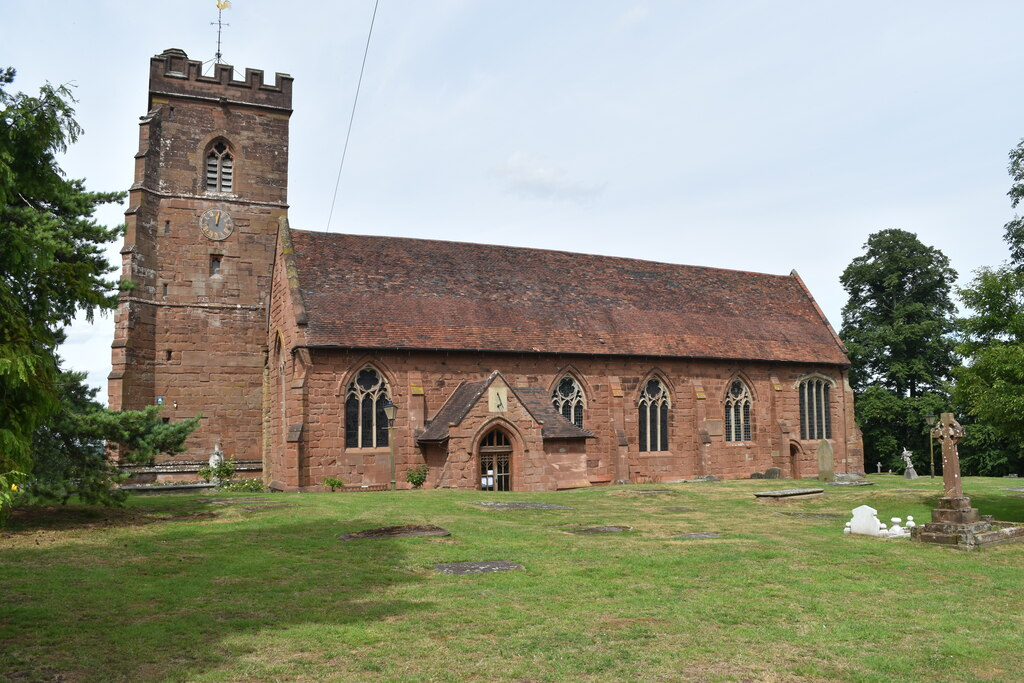
- St Peter's Church, Kinver
- St Peter's Church, Kinver
- 52.4452°N 2.2279°W
- OS grid reference: SO 84614 83049
- Location: Church Hill, Kinver, Staffordshire
- Country: England
- Denomination: Church of England
- Website: www.stpeterskinver.org.uk

History
- Status: Parish church
- Dedication: Saint Peter
- Dedicated: 1315 (chancel)

Architecture
- Functional status: Active
- Heritage designation: Grade I listed
- Designated: 27 June 1963
- Architectural type: Church
- Style: Norman, Gothic
- Years built: Early 14th century (incorporating 12th-century fragments)

Specifications
- Materials: Stone, tile roof

Administration
- Diocese: Diocese of Lichfield
- Archdeaconry: Walsall
- Deanery: Trysull
- Parish: Kinver

St Peter's Church, Kinver is a Grade I listed Church of England parish church in Kinver, Staffordshire, England. The church, which contains fragments from a 12th-century Norman structure, dates primarily from the early 14th century with substantial 15th-century extensions. It underwent major restoration in the 1880s and a complete rebuilding of its north aisle in 1976.

== History ==
=== Medieval period ===
The church is recorded in the Domesday Book of 1086, indicating that a foundation existed on the site at that time. The earliest surviving fabric includes 12th-century fragments, suggesting the presence of a Norman church, possibly built on the site of an earlier Saxon wooden structure.

Records of a consecration in 1315 probably refer to the chancel. The current church building dates mostly from the early 14th century, with the nave and south aisle constructed during this period. A 12th-century pilaster buttress survives at the junction of the nave with the south aisle to the west.

The church was substantially extended in the mid-15th century. The south aisle was extended eastward by a single bay to form the Grey Chapel, and the north chancel aisle, known as the Foley Chapel, was added. The Foley Chapel was in existence by 1472 when its founder, John Hampton, a courtier of King Henry VI, was buried there.

=== Post-medieval period ===
The church continued to serve the parish of Kinver throughout the post-medieval period, maintaining its medieval structure with ongoing repairs and maintenance.

=== Victorian restoration ===
The organ chamber was added in 1874. In 1878, Sir George Gilbert Scott consulted about and planned the restoration of the church for the Reverend Hodgson. Following Scott's death, the restoration was carried out by his son John Oldrid Scott in 1884–1885. The tower was refaced during this period between 1893 and 1895 by J. A. Chatwin.

=== 20th century ===
The most significant 20th-century change occurred in 1976 when the north aisle was completely rebuilt. The Victorian north aisle, constructed in 1856–1857 by Thomas Smith of Stourbridge, had not been well built and was in danger of pulling the entire church over. The new north aisle was designed by John Greaves Smith of Kinver and, whilst controversial at the time, provides additional space with natural lighting.

== Architecture ==
=== Exterior ===
St Peter's Church is built in dressed stone blocks with plain tile roofs and coped verges. The building consists of a west tower, a four-bay nave with side aisles and south porch, and a two-bay aisled chancel.

The west tower dates from the mid-14th century and has four stages marked by moulded strings and a crenellated parapet. It features diagonal buttresses and contains a pointed west door of two chamfered orders with a returned hood mould. Above the door is a pointed three-light window with reticulated tracery and a hood mould. The tower stands approximately 50 feet (15 metres) from apex to floor.

The south aisle dates from the early 14th century and was extended eastward in the mid-15th century. It features buttresses at the bay divisions and pointed 14th-century windows of three lights with Decorated tracery. The windows of the east bay (the Grey Chapel) have Tudor arches and cinquefoil-headed lights.

The gabled south porch dates from approximately 1380 and has a 20th-century eastern extension. It features a four-centred arch opening with an inner chamfered order and an outer quarter-round moulded order.

The chancel features a pointed east window of five cinquefoil-headed lights with panel tracery. The north chancel aisle (Foley Chapel) has three windows to the north and one to the east, all similar in character to those of the Grey Chapel.

=== Interior ===
The interior features a 14th-century south arcade and a north arcade from 1856 to 1857 by Thomas Smith of Stourbridge (replaced in 1976). Both have octagonal columns with moulded capitals and pointed arches of two chamfered orders. The easternmost column of the south arcade bears the inscription "THO / PIXELL / WILL / BANNISTER / 1671 / CHUR WARDENS".

A notable feature is the remains of a newel staircase immediately north of the chancel, leading to a door with a semicircular arch. This probably communicated with a former rood loft. The staircase would have provided access to a platform on top of a screen that once separated the nave from the chancel, where statues of saints could be decorated to celebrate particular saints' days.

The nave is covered by an early 14th-century common-rafter roof with double collars, with the lower collars being arch-braced. This roof structure was concealed until a false ceiling was removed in 1976. The roof lacks purlins or horizontal beams running from west to east, an early form of construction. It is doubtful this structure would have remained stable without the tower to lean on.

The chancel features a 15th-century arch-braced collar rafter roof of four-centred section, whilst the Foley Chapel has a 15th-century panelled roof of four-centred section.

At the east end of the 14th-century south aisle are 14th-century sedilia and piscina, all with ogee arches.

=== Furnishings ===
The church contains a late 14th-century stone font with elaborate tracery patterns. The hexagonal oak pulpit with balustraded steps is dated 1623 but was heavily restored in 1903. A late 17th-century oak communion rail features richly carved balusters.

The panelled oak reredos has fluted Ionic pilasters and panelled side walls to the sanctuary.

A unique feature is the lantern above the font in the south aisle. This huge lantern is made of stained-glass panels and illuminated from within. The panels date from 1905 and were salvaged from the windows of the 19th-century north aisle before it was demolished.

=== Monuments ===
The church contains several significant monuments:

In the Grey Chapel stands the chest tomb of Sir Edward Grey (died 1528), a distant relative of Lady Jane Grey. The tomb features incised brasses showing Sir Edward, his two wives, seven sons, and ten daughters. The tomb was originally placed in the chancel itself but was moved to its current location in the 19th century as it obstructed the way to the altar.

The Foley Chapel contains a mutilated 15th-century recumbent effigy of a knight, reputed to be that of John Hampton (died 1472), the founder of the chapel. According to local legend, this statue was rescued from a pigsty at the bottom of the hill below the church.

Other notable monuments include a large tablet to William Talbot (died 1686) with a segmental pediment capped by an urn, and a tablet to Dorothy and Edward Hillman (died 1722 and 1727) with a broken semi-circular pediment. In the chancel is a tablet to Eliza Crawshaw (died 1813), capped by an obelisk with a palm tree motif.

The south aisle contains a large First World War memorial incorporating a statue of Saint George.

=== Stained glass ===
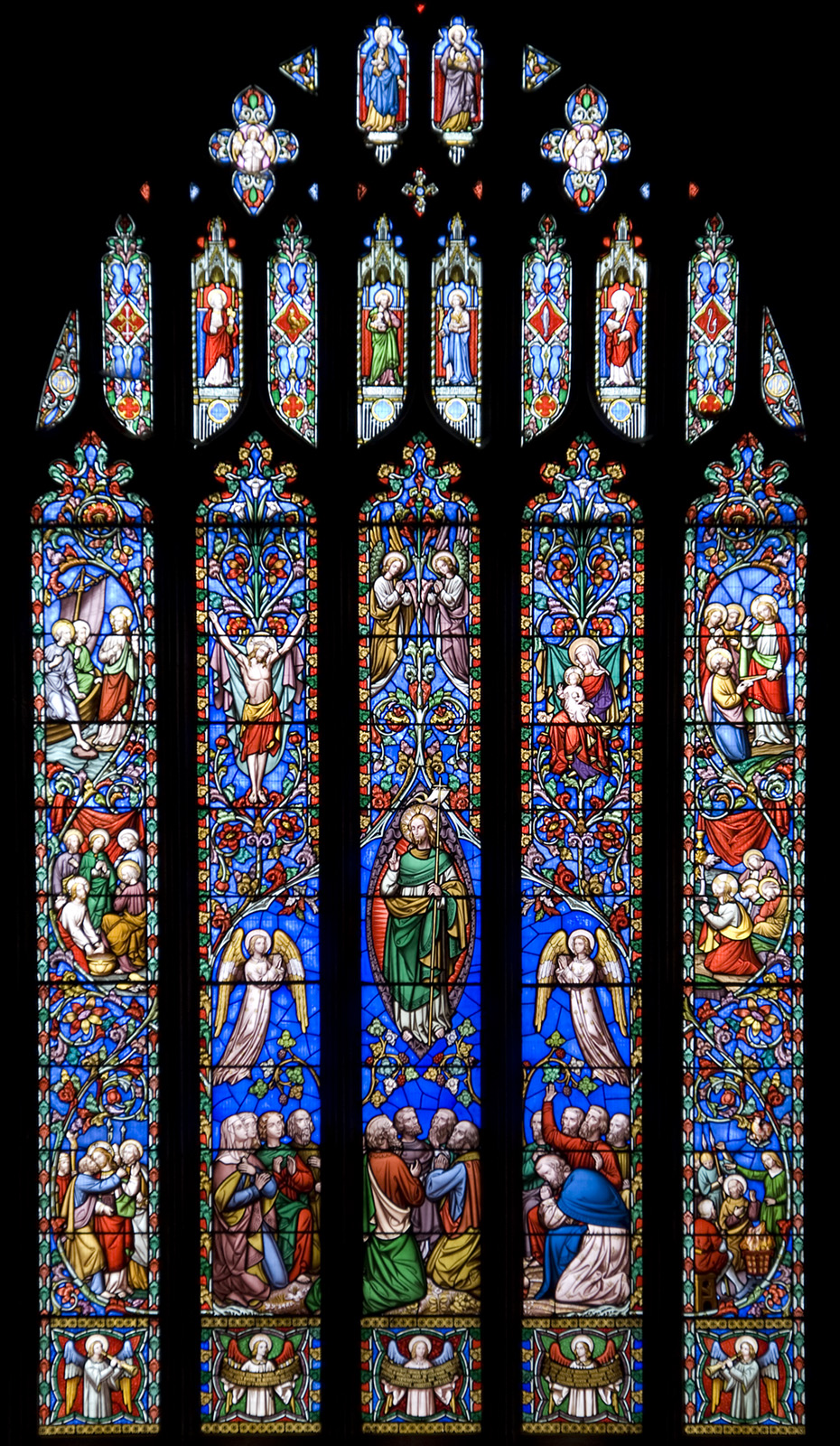
The east window

The east window, dating from approximately 1849, shows scenes from the life of Jesus. The window is of significant scale and colour, and with morning sun streaming through it comes alive. Around the edge are scenes from the life of Saint Peter, including a depiction in the bottom right corner of a cock crowing after Peter denies knowing Jesus three times.

There are two early 20th-century windows in the south aisle.

A glazed screen designed by John Greaves Smith at the end of the 20th century encloses the archway to the Grey Chapel. It depicts the church on the hill above Kinver with the river and canal running through it. The "upside-down" cross motif is the badge of Saint Peter, who, according to tradition, asked to be crucified upside down in deference to the way that Jesus died.

== Bells ==
The tower contains a ring of eight bells which have been fully renovated.

== Organ ==
The church has an organ with a case added in 1927–1928 by Giles Gilbert Scott. The current organ is a Conacher instrument that was completely rebuilt in 2006 by Trevor Tipple and is played from a remote console. The organ accompanies services and concerts throughout the year.

A separate pipe organ is situated in the Whittall Memorial Chapel.

== Parish status ==
St Peter's Church serves as the parish church for Kinver and is part of the Benefice of Kinver and Enville. The church is part of the Diocese of Lichfield, within the Archdeaconry of Walsall and the Deanery of Trysull.

== See also ==
• Kinver • Kinver Edge • Listed buildings in Kinver • George Gilbert Scott • Giles Gilbert Scott
