= Archie Hill =

Writer

Arthur "Archie" Hill (3 May 1928 – 1986) was a writer, broadcaster and photographer who came from the English Black Country, a region which provided the central theme for his work. His writing included acclaimed autobiographical books as well as novels, radio plays, television scripts and journalism. The pinnacle of his broadcasting career was a four-part 1974 BBC TV series called Archie Hill Comes Home.

He was described by writer Michael Pearson as: hugely talented … very rough Black Country with a lived-in face. An alcoholic with suicidal tendencies, he was said to be programmed to self-destruct, but always had a smile and a twinkle in his eye."

He died by suicide in 1986.

== Life ==
=== Childhood ===
Hill was born and raised close to Kinver, near Stourbridge, on the edge of the Black Country, the eldest but one of eleven children. His family lived in impoverished working-class conditions, and his father was an abusive alcoholic. These circumstances led to Hill leading a troubled childhood and turning for comfort and guidance and friendship to friends of his father, called Konk and Pope Tolley, who taught him a great deal about life and country lore.

Hill's attendance at school was sporadic though he did attend Art College around the age of fifteen.

=== Early adult life ===
At sixteen, Hill left Art College and started working on canal barges. At age eighteen, in 1945, he entered the RAF where he was to serve for six years, the first four in the Middle East and then as a member of the Military Police. During this period he developed a chronic dependence on alcohol.

After his military service ended Hill relocated to Hertfordshire and joined the Police Force in 1951. This was short-lived as his alcoholism made it impossible for him to fulfill his duties. During this period he also had a brief marriage which ended due to his abusive behaviour. He was picked up in the street suffering from alcohol poisoning and spent a period in a mental hospital. Some time after release, he was arrested and was imprisoned for theft from gas metres. In prison he met the physicist and spy, Klaus Fuchs who introduced him to classical music and the arts generally; this meeting played a large part in Hill's subsequent development.

After being discharged from prison, he lived rough for a time eventually finding the resolve to overcome his dependence on drink and live a more stable life. He worked at several labouring jobs before joining The Sunday People, working on the Readers' Advice Bureau for four years. He also married for the second time and become a father in 1963.

=== Life as a writer and broadcaster ===
His newspaper experience led him to becoming a freelance writer, specialising in radio scripts and also writing one story for the popular BBC TV police drama, Z-Cars. His major breakthrough as a writer came in 1973 with the publication of his first book, A Cage of Shadows, dealing with his life until the time when he stopped living rough. The book revealed his talent for honest and unsentimental narrative and led to the most successful period of his career.

Over the next eleven years he wrote a further eight books, made many radio broadcasts as well presenting as a TV series. Hill also worked as a photo-journalist but very little of his work survives.

=== Later life and death ===
The publication of An Empty Glass (1984) revealed that problems with alcohol had resurfaced and his second marriage had ended after twenty years. It was the last of Hill's known written output and he then disappeared from public life.

He died by suicide from carbon monoxide poisoning in 1986.

== Books published ==
=== Autobiographical books ===
==== A Cage of Shadows – 1973 ====
This book covered Hill's life up to the early 1950s. It sets out, in unsparing detail, the family problems caused by his father's abusive behavior as well as Hill's own difficulties in early life. It includes unsentimental descriptions of the nature of working-class Black Country existence during the depression, including an account of a rat killing contest and portraits of his adult friends Konk and Pope Tolley. It also provides a harsh account of his experiences in a mental hospital, in prison and sleeping rough in London, before ending on a more optimistic note as he finds a new resolve to live a more settled life. The epilogue looks back on his experiences from the perspective of his life in 1973 when the book was written.

The original text included material about Hill's mother which she considered defamatory. She successfully sued for libel and the book was reissued with an apology from Hill and most references to his mother omitted.

The Tangerine Press reissued the original text in May 2017. The head of Tangerine Press, Michael Curran, considers it to be a 'lost classic'.

==== Summer's End – 1976 ====
This book grew out of the filming for 'Archie Hill Comes Homes' when Hill returned to the Black Country. He reflects that 'men of my generation are the last of the fully Black Country race, perhaps the last echo of it...". As in A Cage of Shadows, the book provides autobiographical stories from Hill's youth, though now told with a slightly mellower and more humorous tone as he realises that, notwithstanding the poverty of the depression, there were still 'some golden chapters of childhood; that not all my memories were dark and bleak'.

==== Closed World of Love – 1976 ====
This 110 page book focused on the life and being of Hill's wife's son Barry who suffered from cerebral palsy and lived a severely restricted life, requiring the use of a wheelchair and unable to speak. Hill describes how he is able to learn from his step-son by imaginatively putting himself in his place.

The book won the 1977 Christopher Award. In reviewing the book, Tony Parker in the Sunday Times described Hill as "… one of the most sensitive contemporary autobiographical writers we have".

==== The Second Meadow – 1982 ====
Following three fictional works, Hill returned to his own life for his eighth book. He recounts three months he spent in 1976 living off the land on a remote country estate, making use of his poaching skills to kill animals for food. The title refers to his observation that only brave animals venture to the meadows far from the safety of the woods. He speculates that only great artists like Beethoven have reached the metaphorical second meadow and resolves to strive to find the equivalent places in his life.

==== An Empty Glass – 1984 ====
This book looks at Hill's life with particular emphasis on the impact of his alcoholism. It reiterates much of the autobiographical details from A Cage of Shadows but from a different perspective. As this was the last of his writing it has been speculated that he had run out of subjects to write about.

=== Novels ===
- A Corridor of Mirrors – 1975
- Sergeant Sahib – 1979
- Prison Bars – 1980
- Dark pastures – 1981 (juvenile fiction)

== Broadcasting ==
=== Television ===
The success of his first book led to Hill being given the opportunity to make a 4-part TV Series, Archie Hill Comes Home, which was broadcast in 1974. The films were:

- Episode 1 - The Living Legend was about his return to the Black Country. The title refers to Lucy Woodall, the last surviving female chainworker.
- Episode 2 - Up with the Workers - looked into a Black Country-man's working day and included visits to a foundry, a century-old metal workshop, a modern cycle factory and finally Hill does a day's stint with a blacksmith.
- Episode 3 - Sweat of the Brow - continued the industrial theme with visits to a brick-yard and to a crystal glass factory.
- Episode 4 - Come Saturday - focused on leisure activities such as pigeon racing, whippets, bare-fisted fighting and a pub-night.

In 1976 he made a film about his stepson for the series The Light of Experience called Closed World of Love which dealt with the themes of the book of the same name.

=== Radio ===
In 1973, Hill gave five talks on the men and crafts of the Black Country on Radio 4.

Following that, much of his radio work was built around his books, including readings from A Cage of Shadows (1973), a single programme with the title The Second Meadow broadcast on BBC Radio 4 in 1977, a series of readings from Closed World of Love in 1978 and a five-part broadcast, again of The Second Meadow, in 1982.

A dramatisation of Hill’s novel, A Corridor of Mirrors, was broadcast by BBC radio in 1977.

He also participated in discussion programmes dealing with themes that were predominant in his writing such as poaching and the industrial West Midlands.
