= ArtsFest =

Annual arts festival in Birmingham, England

- ArtsFest logo

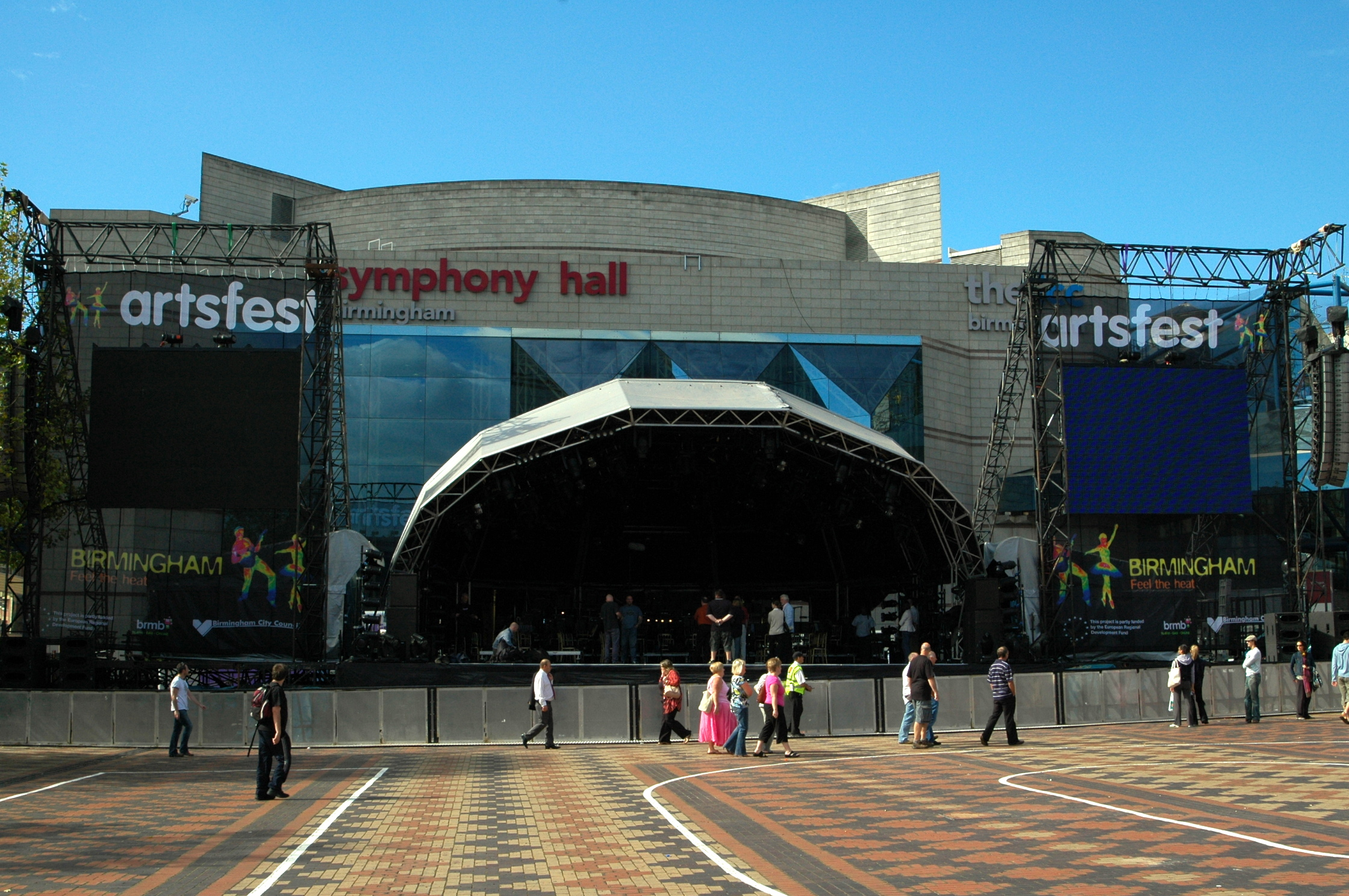
- The stage in Centenary Square being assembled for ArtsFest 2007
- Status: Inactive
- Genre: Art festival
- Frequency: Annually
- Location: Birmingham
- Country: United Kingdom
- Inaugurated: 1997
- Most recent: 2012
- Participants: 400+
- Attendance: 250,000+
- Website: https://www.artsfest.org.uk

ArtsFest was an annual free arts festival held in September in and around Birmingham, England from 1997 to 2012. The festival was free for all attendees and featured varied performances ranging from orchestral music, ballet, rock bands, flash mobs, and dance groups. The main venue was Centenary Square, with other performances taking place across the city centre at venues such as Birmingham Town Hall, Chamberlain Square, Victoria Square, the Custard Factory, Brindleyplace, and as far out as Eastside. Exhibitions were also held at Birmingham Museum and Art Gallery.

Performances and exhibitions at ArtsFest were incredibly varied. Performances by Birmingham Royal Ballet, Birmingham Opera Company, and City of Birmingham Symphony Orchestra were an annual occurrence, oftentimes together. 2006 first broadened ArtsFest to Eastside, with Aston Manor Transport Museum providing transport between there, the city centre, and The Drum Arts Centre. In 2008, ArtsFest recognised The Archers with a plaque on the Birmingham Walk of Stars and featured a reggae performance by Basil Gabbidon. 2009's ArtsFest had a hands-on interactive Bang Goes the Theory exhibition and 2009's KerrangFest saw a performance by The Arcadian Kicks. ArtsFest's 2010 theme was Landscape and Heritage, introducing Folk Dance Fest. 2010's KerrangFest saw indie rock band The Twang performing. 2011 introduced the FlowerFest. 2012's music stage was emceed by Adrian Goldberg and saw performances by Poppy & the Jezebels and The Musgraves.

In early 2013, Birmingham City Council announced the festival had been cancelled with immediate effect, citing a desire to save money and replace it with a cheaper event. ArtsFest had cost the council £130,000 in subsidies per year. Some of the money saved would go towards a festival held for the opening of the Library of Birmingham in September 2013.

== Gallery ==
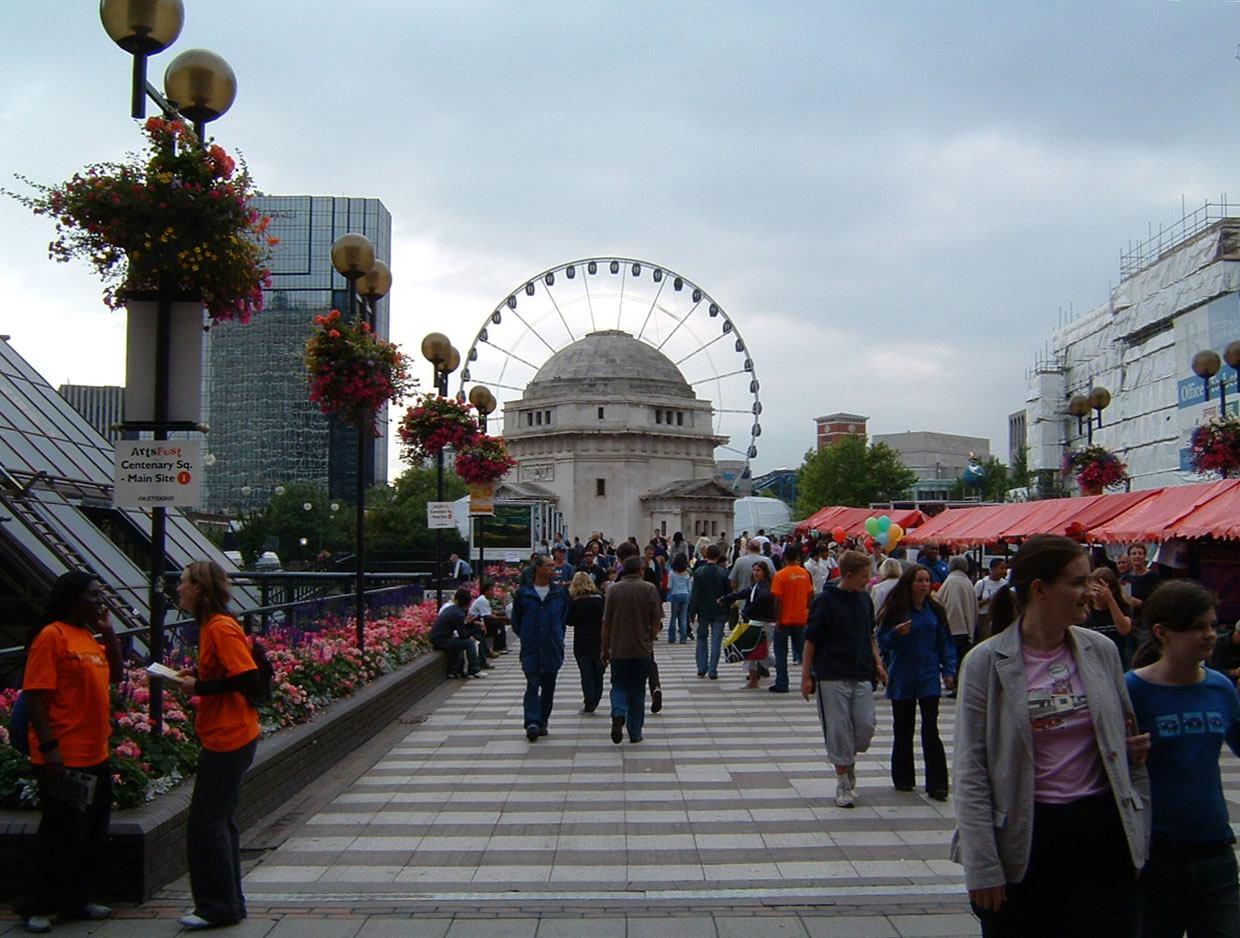
Approach to Centenary Square at ArtsFest 2005

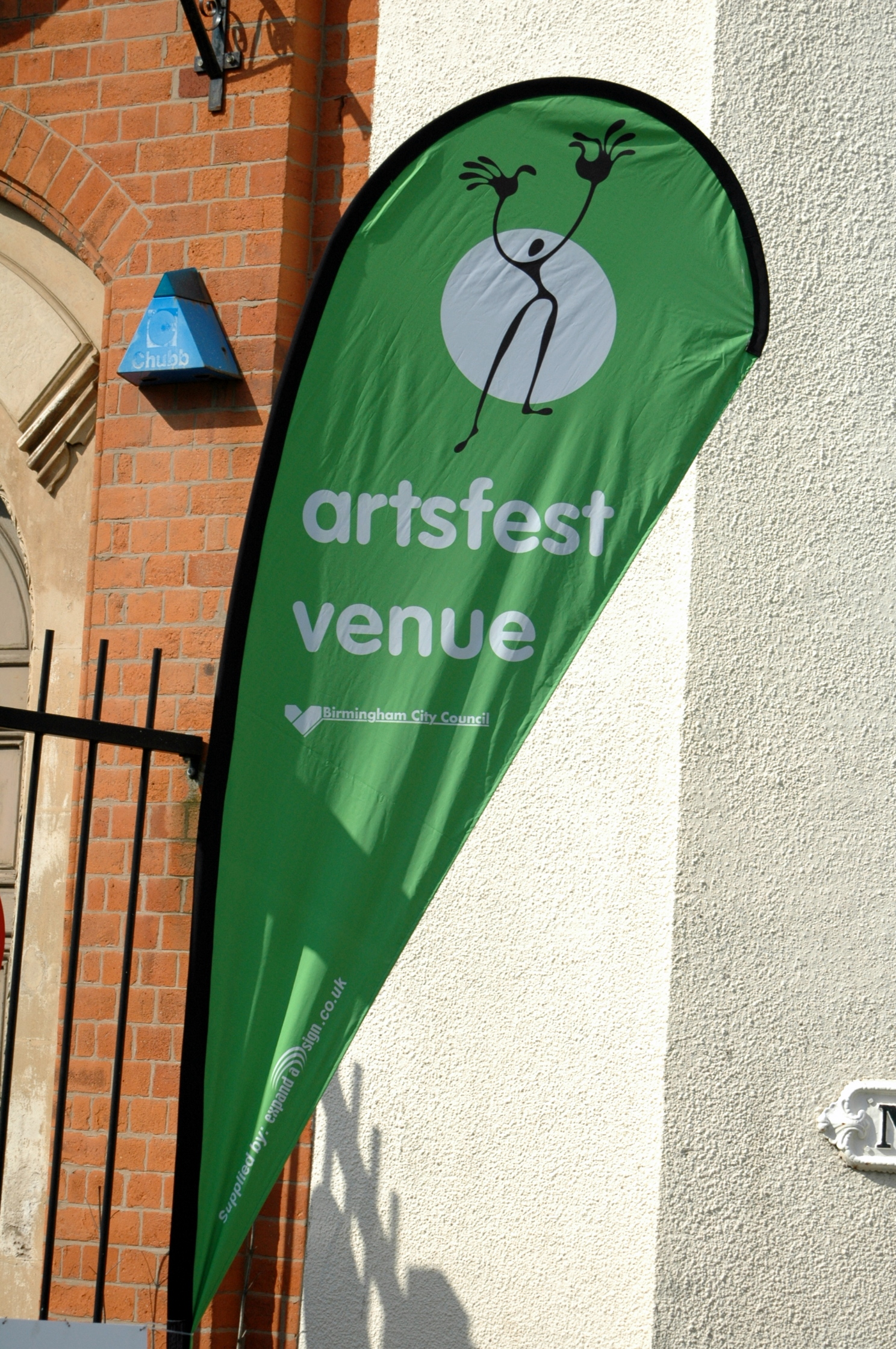
In 2008, flags were placed at ArtsFest venues around the city.

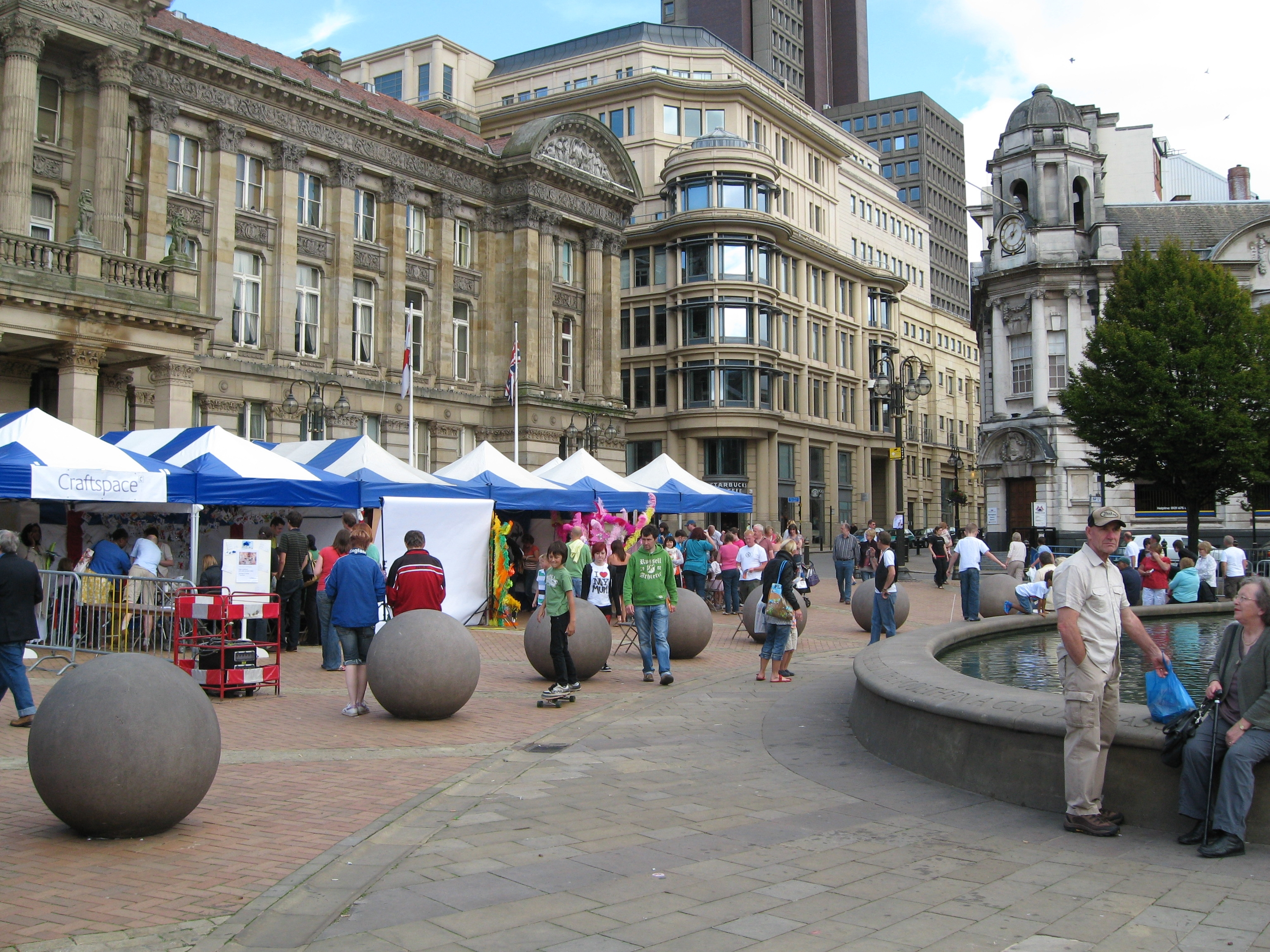
Stalls at ArtsFest 2009

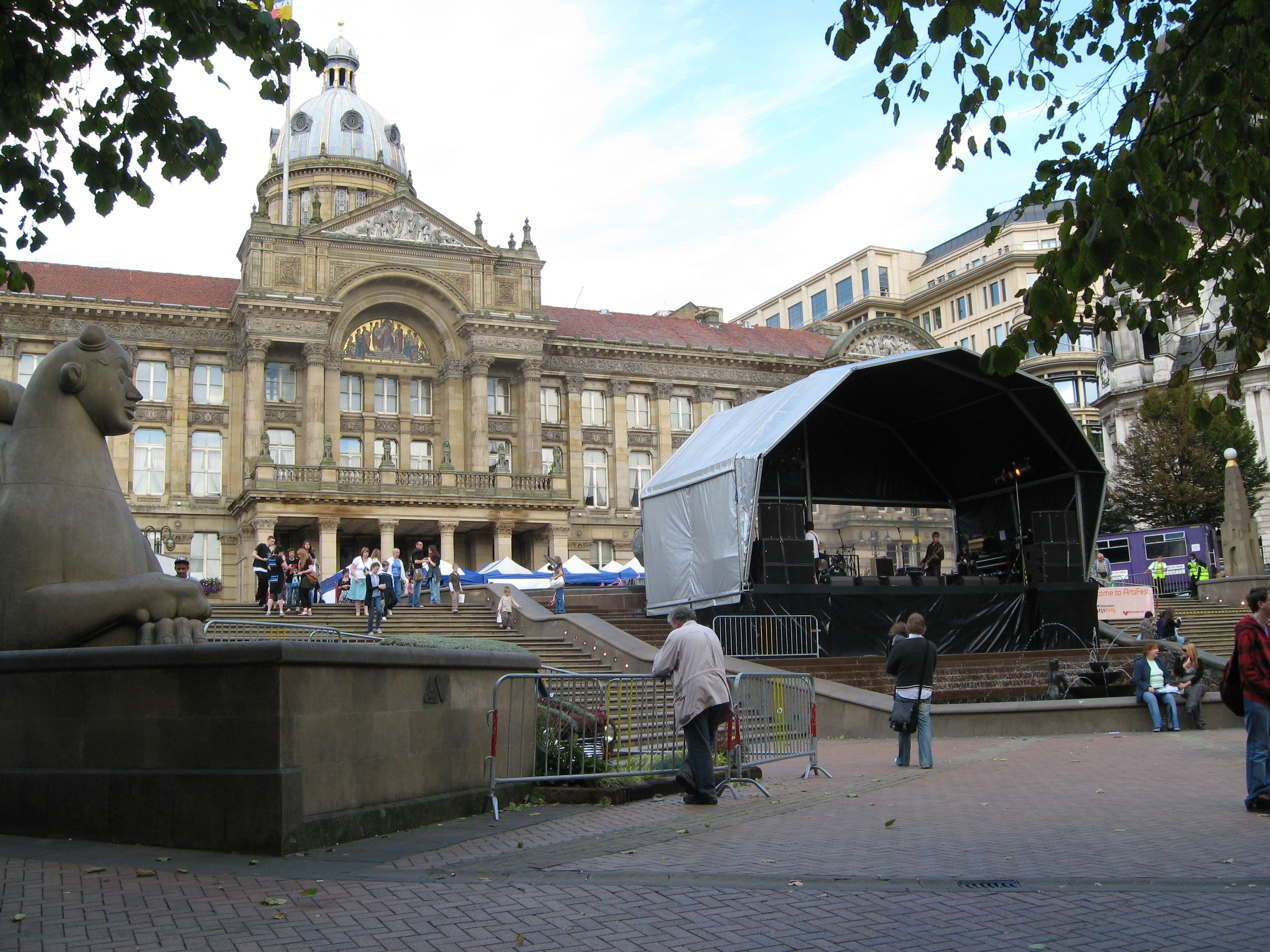
Stage at Victoria Square at ArtsFest 2009

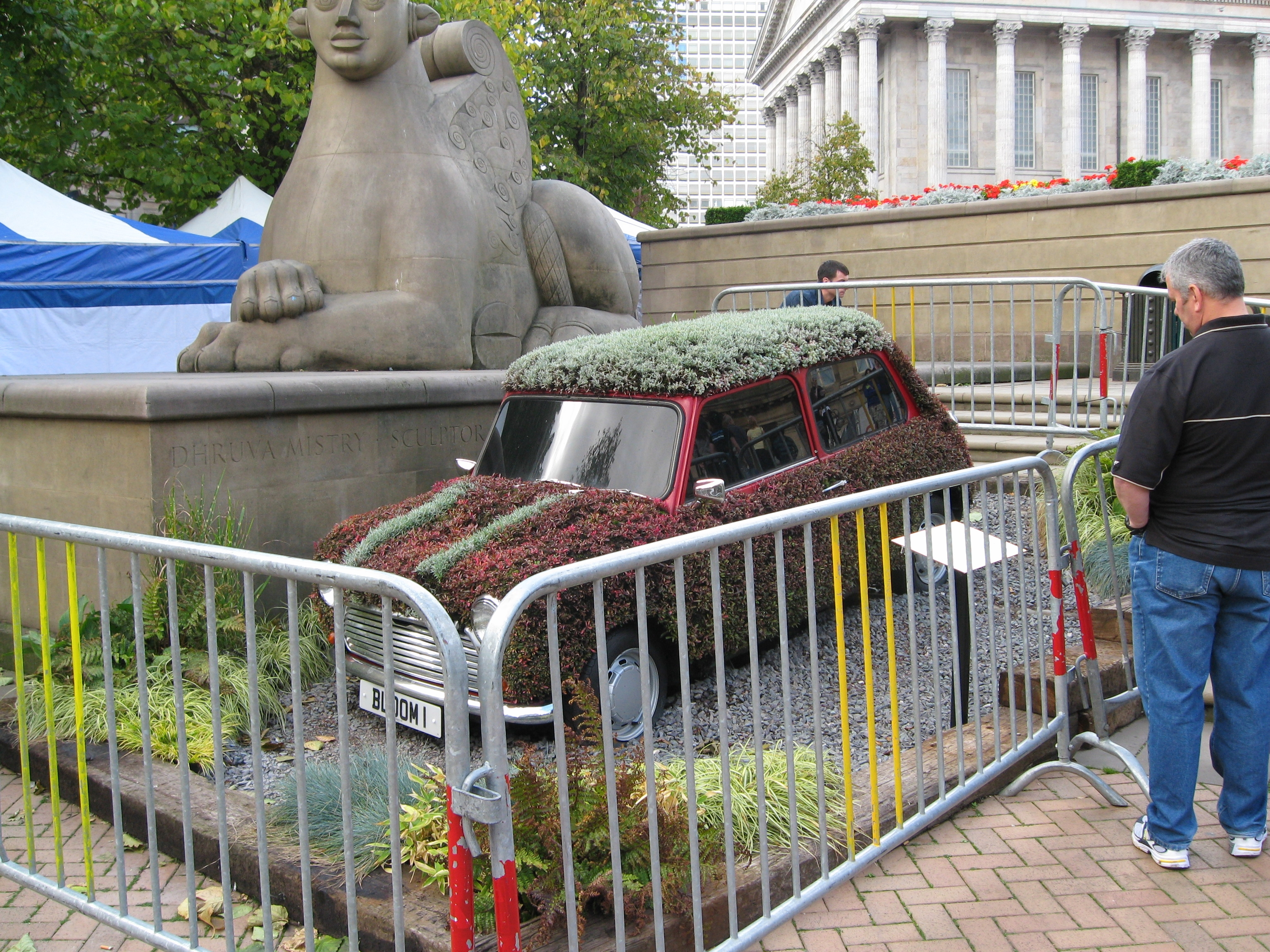
Floral car at ArtsFest 2009

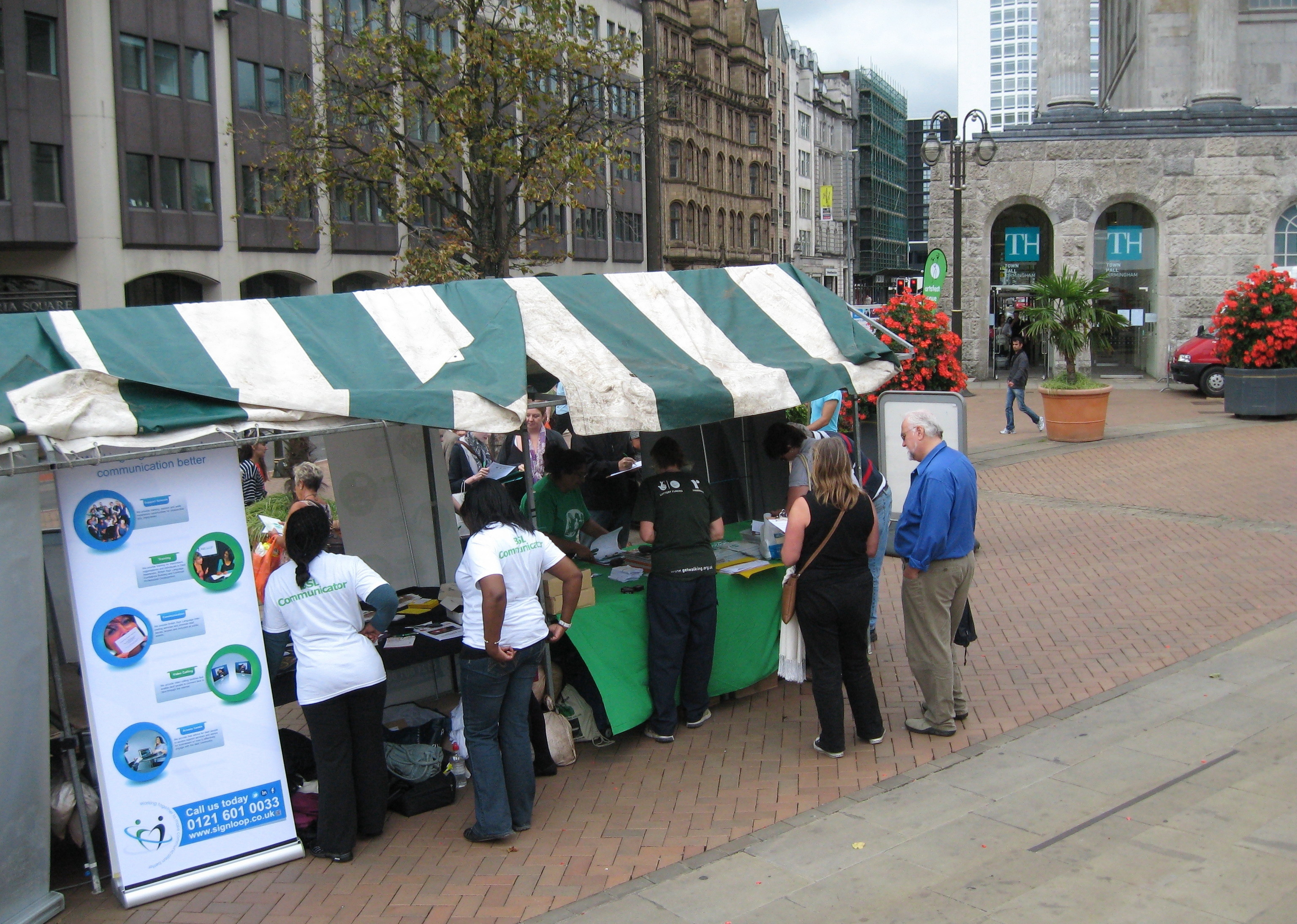
Stall at ArtsFest 2011
