= Dunsley =

Dunsley may refer to:

- Dunsley, North Yorkshire, England
- Dunsley, Staffordshire, England
