= Isle of Wight Festival 2010 =

2010 English musical event

- Genre: Rock, pop
- Dates: 11–13 June 2010
- Locations: Seaclose Park, Newport, Isle of Wight, UK
- Website: Official website

The Isle of Wight Festival 2010 was the ninth revived Isle of Wight Festival to be held at Seaclose Park in Newport on the Isle of Wight. The event ran from 11 until 13 June 2010. Tickets were released on Friday 4 December 2009.

The 2010 event was the last in the current contract with the Isle of Wight Council to take place, tying in with the last event for Festival First, guaranteeing festival-goers a ticket for three years. Event organisers Solo are in discussion with the Isle of Wight Council to seal a deal to guarantee the Festival continue for a further ten years.

The first acts were confirmed as Jay-Z, The Strokes, Blondie, Pink, Squeeze and Orbital.

== Line up ==
The complete line up was as follows:

=== Main stage ===
Friday

- Jay-Z
- Florence and the Machine
- Calvin Harris
- Doves
- Mr Hudson
- Hockey
- Waterburner

Saturday

- The Strokes
- Blondie
- Biffy Clyro
- Vampire Weekend
- Crowded House
- Paloma Faith
- The Hold Steady
- Melanie Safka
- Detroit Social Club

Sunday

- Paul McCartney
- Pink
- Editors
- Spandau Ballet
- Friendly Fires
- The Courteeners
- Suzanne Vega
- The Coronas
- Paper Romance

=== Big Top ===
Thursday (campers and festival first only)

- Squeeze
- Are You Experienced

Friday

- Suzi Quatro
- Juliette Lewis
- Marina And The Diamonds
- Shakespears Sister
- Wonderland
- Woman
- Daisy Dares You
- I Blame Coco

Saturday

- Orbital
- La Roux
- N Dubz
- The Saturdays
- Noah And The Whale
- Devendra Banhart
- Bombay Bicycle Club
- Semi-Precious Weapons
- The Brilliant Things
- The Arcadian Kicks

Sunday

- James
- Ocean Colour Scene
- Local Natives
- Reef
- Steve Harley and Cockney Rebel
- The Big Pink
- The Alarm
- Saint Jude
