= Louis Barnett (chocolatier) =

English chocolatier

- Born: 2 November 1991 (age 34); Worcester, Worcestershire
- Occupations: Chocolatier & Business Consultant
- Years active: 2004-present
- Employer: Self-Employed

Louis Barnett (born 2 November 1991) from Kinver, Staffordshire is a chocolatier who became the youngest supplier of both the Sainsbury's and Waitrose supermarket chains at the age of 14. He started making chocolates for friends and family and in 2005 he started his company Chokolit to deal with the growing demand.

He received the Lord Carter Award for excellence in the food industry, presented to him in The House Of Lords 2009, and was nominated for a Young Entrepreneur of the Year Award in 2007. He was also a finalist in the teen category of the 2007 Enterprising Young Brits Awards.

He left school at the age of 11 because of learning difficulties and was later diagnosed with dyslexia, dyspraxia, dyscalculia, and autism. His parents continued his education through homeschooling. He now works as a business consultant.

== Early life and education ==
Louis Barnett was raised by his parents Phil and Mary Barnett in the village of Kinver, Staffordshire. Besides his work as a chocolatier, he is a champagne connoisseur and an amateur photographer.

Throughout school, Barnett struggled to meet the teachers' expectations. They were satisfied with his vocabulary and general knowledge, but they focused on his weak points like maths and written work. Because other children didn't understand him, he would get into fights and be the target of bullying. At the age of 11, after just six weeks of secondary school, his parents took him out of the regular schooling system and gave him a vocational homeschooling program. He was diagnosed the same year with dyslexia, dyspraxia, dyscalculia, and autism.

His parents hired a tutor (Jan) who helped with his studies, but was also encouraged by his parents to follow his interests. He decided to learn about chocolate and champagne. He has since taken up fencing to improve his coordination (which is affected by developmental coordination disorder). After a falconry experience day, Barnett spent 18 months working as a volunteer at a falconry centre. He started out cleaning and gardening, but was eventually trusted to fly the birds of prey in shows and corporate events. His experience resulted in the permission to keep his pet African eagle owl Jewell. One day he bought a book titled "Belgian Chocolate Cakes and Chocolate" from a nearby garden centre. He started by making chocolate mousse and cakes, but eventually he focused on making chocolates and he became the youngest person to go on a course (and get certified) at the Banbury branch of the prestigious Callebaut Chocolate Academy. In 2008, he started his work as a public speaker.

== Career ==
As of 2021, Barnett was a full-time business consultant and public speaker since 2015.

=== Chokolit ===
Louis started making chocolates in his kitchen for friends and family, but when he started selling the chocolates to local businesses, he had to move the operation to the garage. Chokolit was founded in 2005 and funded with a local grant of £5,000 and a £500 loan from his grandparents to buy a special machine that regulates chocolate temperature. The name of the company was chosen because that was how he used to spell chocolate due to his dyslexia.

Soon his parents' garage was too small to deal with the growing demand and production had to relocate to a new factory in Bridgnorth, Shropshire. The factory was officially opened by South Staffordshire MP Sir Patrick Cormack on 14 December 2007. The company's signature product was the edible chocolate box, which Barnett created when he was 13 to cut down on packaging expenses, and chocolate handbags, which used 53% pure dark chocolate supplied by Callebaut.

In 2012, Barnett began to consider closing the company, due feeling unable to keep the high standards he had for his company, and with ingredient prices rising. By 2015, he had sold all of the company's assets, and had transitioned into a career as a full-time business consultant. Louis Barnett Chocolates LTD (the company under which Chokolit was run) was dissolved in May 2016, and it has not traded since, although its website remained public until 2019.

=== Activism ===
Barnett was involved in a lobby for the reclassification of palm oil In contrast to other vegetable oils which have been connected to the health and longevity of Mediterranean people, palm oil is saturated and not healthy. Despite this, palm oil is widely used in the confectionery industry which he believes devalues the product. It is also used as a bio fuel. He argues that the loss of rain forest to provide space for palm plantations causes the destruction of the only remaining habitat of Sumatran orang-utans and that together with the carbon dioxide formed by burning the oil it leads to a net increase of carbon dioxide in the atmosphere.

In support of this effort he released a range of chocolate bars called "Biting Back Bar" which he launched on 29 May 2008 at Chester Zoo, the first place to stock the bars. The first bar, the "Orang-utan Biting Back Bar", contained dark chocolate bar and has a hint of orange. It was sold by Chokolit, and several British zoos.

Early in 2008, the MP who opened Chokolit's Bridgnorth production facility arranged for Barnett to meet Prime Minister Gordon Brown and conservative leader David Cameron at the Houses of Parliament. He discussed his views on palm oil with the politicians, showed the first "Biting Back Bar" and discussed opening a new outlet with House of Commons catering chiefs. Cameron called Barnett "a most remarkable young man who has the makings of becoming one of the significant entrepreneurs of the next decade".

== Awards and honours ==
- 2011 Emerging Entrepreneur of the Year Award (won) Insider business Awards, Belfry
- Lord Carter Award for excellence in the food industry (won)
- Young Entrepreneur of the Year Award 2007 (nominated)
- 2007 Enterprising Young Brits Awards (finalist, teen category)
- Heart of England Fine Foods Diamond Awards (shortlisted, confectionery category)
- Food Processing Awards 2007(finalist, Packaging Innovation of the Year)

Louis was awarded the honour of "Young Champion" in 2010 at the inaugural Youth Olympic Games in Singapore and attended at the "What Makes A Young Champion?" event.
