= William Whorwood =

Member of the Parliament of England

Sir William Whorwood (c.1500 – 28 May 1545) was a landowner in Staffordshire and the neighbouring counties, a distinguished lawyer, and a politician in the reign of Henry VIII. He achieved the positions of Solicitor General and Attorney General.

== Background and early years ==
Whorwood was born before 1505: his elder brother John was aged 40 in 1534, and taking account also of the dates of his education, it can be assumed that William was born 1500–1502.

He was the second or third son of John Whorwood of Compton, near Kinver one of a family of minor gentry, who had long lived at Compton, in Kinver, Staffordshire. The family name is also rendered Horwood or Horewode, giving an indication of contemporary pronunciation. His mother was Elizabeth Corbyn, daughter of Richard Corbyn of Kingswinford, Staffordshire.

Whorwood was admitted to the Middle Temple for legal training on 2 November 1519. Within two years he was acting as receiver of monies for the serjeants-at-law, the elite group of lawyers who monopolised work in the central courts. He quickly built up a successful practice, working for eminent clients. He handled the funeral accounts of Sir Thomas Lovell in 1524 and three years later was advising Anne Rede, niece of William Warham, the Archbishop of Canterbury on her jointure. In 1526 he was nominated for the post of Common Serjeant of London, the capital city's senior legal officer, by the mayor and aldermen of London, although he was unsuccessful in the face of competition from a royal nominee.

== Political career ==
In 1529 Whorwood was returned as Member of the English Parliament for the borough of Downton in Wiltshire This was one of three boroughs controlled by the Diocese of Winchester. The bishop's bailiff simply filled in the election return or indenture and handed it to the High Sheriff of Wiltshire. The bishop in commendam at the time was Thomas Wolsey, formerly the king's senior counsellor, but his career had entered its final crisis. It is possible Warham influenced the returns. Five of the six seats controlled by Winchester were taken by senior legal figures, including Whorwood's colleague at Downton, Nicholas Hare and Thomas Cromwell at Taunton.

Whorwood served throughout the English Reformation Parliament, a period of more than six years. In 1533 his name appeared on a list drawn up by Cromwell and thought to be the names of the principal members opposed to the Statute in Restraint of Appeals However, he seems to have been generally cooperative with royal policy, and certainly showed no scruples in profiting from the Dissolution of the Lesser Monasteries Act, which helped secure gentry support for the English Reformation. By the end of the parliament he had good relations with Cromwell and the administration. He was appointed Solicitor General on 13 April 1536, the day before the parliament was dissolved.

The king requested that the same members be returned to the next parliament, due to be called later in the year. However, Whorwood was not returned for Downton. However, he was paid £26 13s.4d. "for his pains in the time of the Parliament", so it seems that he must have attended the House of Lords. He received recognition of his eminence at his own Inn of Court by being appointed bencher and Autumn Reader there in 1537. From 1539 he was the recipient of a writ of assistance to attend the Lords – the first Solicitor General to be called thus. In July 1539 he and the Attorney General were paid £30 each for their attendance, with £6 13s.4d. to share among their clerks. Whorwood probably helped draft major measures during the parliament, including the Second Act of Dissolution and the act imposing the Six Articles, a reaffirmation of traditional Roman Catholic dogma.

Whorwood was used both regularly and in emergency to enforce the law in his native county and elsewhere. He was a justice of the peace in Staffordshire. In April 1536 he was sent with John Hynde to help suppress a rising in Somerset and each received £50 "for executing of rebels in the west". The following year he was sent to deal with the aftermath of the Lincolnshire Rising. He was also employed in the revenue courts, receiving very large payments for his advice. In 1540 he was made Attorney General, in succession to John Baker, although he and Baker continued to work together on many issues. In 1544 Whorwood was made a member of the court of surveyors at a salary of £6 13s.4d. It was probably this connection that allowed him to buy a series of properties in the West Midlands.

== Landowner ==
Whorwood's family seem to have been settled at the southern edge of Staffordshire for about a century before his birth, although his remoter ancestors are unknown. The family estate at Compton, just west of Kinver, was referred to as la Horewode alias le Halowes. He is frequently referred to as William Whorwood of Compton Hallows. Compton was a small manor, which belonged to his father and later elder brother. The family were not prominent until William greatly increased their wealth and influence. This he achieved by using his contacts in the royal administration.

Whorwood bought from the king the manor of Kinver with Stourton Castle in 1537 and subsequently the rectory impropriate of Kinver, which remained in the family until 1672. He also acquired various estates elsewhere, including the reversion of White Ladies Priory, a dissolved Augustinian convent in Shropshire. He owned a large house in Putney, probably acquired through his second marriage.

He died on 28 May 1545, leaving two daughters as heirs. Both daughters were taken into wardship by John Dudley, Viscount Lisle, later Duke of Northumberland.

== Marriages and family ==
Whorwood married twice.

- Cassandra Grey, daughter of Sir Edward Grey of Enville, Staffordshire was his first wife. A son, John, died young. Their daughter Anne Whorwood (died 1552), was married to Ambrose Dudley, Earl of Warwick. so her share of her father's estates passed to Thomas Whorwood, William's great nephew.
- Margaret Brooke (died 1589), daughter of Sir Richard Broke of London, was his second wife: after his death she married William Shelton or Sheldon. Their daughter Margaret Whorwood became a ward of Sir Henry Sidney after Dudley's execution in 1553 and was married to Thomas Throckmorton of Coughton Court.

A partition was made of the family estates in 1578, between Thomas Throckmorton and Thomas Whorwood.

Legal offices
Preceded by Richard Rich	Solicitor General; 1536–1540	Succeeded by Henry Bradshaw
Preceded by Sir John Baker	Attorney General; 1540–1545	Succeeded by Henry Bradshaw
