= Kinver High School =

Coordinates: 52.45306°N 2.23138°W

Location
- Enville Road; Kinver; Stourbridge, Staffordshire, BN23 8EJ; England

Information
- Type: Academy
- Local authority: Staffordshire County Council
- Trust: Invictus Education Trust
- Department for Education URN: 141342 Tables
- Ofsted: Reports
- Headteacher: Christopher Heywood
- Gender: Coeducational
- Age: 11 to 16
- Website: https://www.kinverhigh.co.uk/

Kinver High School (formerly Edgecliff High School) is a mixed secondary school and sixth form located in Kinver in the English county of Staffordshire.

Previously a community school administered by Staffordshire County Council, Edgecliff High School converted to academy status in March 2016 and was renamed Kinver High School. The school is now owned by the Invictus Education Trust, but continues to coordinate with Staffordshire County Council for admissions

== Notable former pupils ==
The members of indie rock band The Arcadian Kicks attended the school.
