= Dunsley, Staffordshire =

Hamlet in Staffordshire, England

Coordinates: 52.452°N 2.222°W

Dunsley is a hamlet in Kinver, Staffordshire, England.

The settled part of the hamlet is the part of the village of Kinver, lying east of the River Stour.

== Dunsley manor ==
The majority of the land in the hamlet was within the manor of Kinver and Stourton, but there was also a submanor of Dunsley. This existed as a freehold virgate in the 13th century, owned by a family who took their name from the place. In the 15th century, it belonged to members of the Everdon family, lords of the manor of Orton in Wombourne, but in 15321 passed to William Whorwood, who subsequently bought the manor of Kinver. Under a mortgage of 1635, the manor was granted to William Carter, whose daughter Catherine and her son John Hamerton sold the manor to Philip Foley in 1709.

Dunsley Hall remained part of the Foleys' Prestwood estate until sold by a descendant in 1918. It was purchased by Alfred Marsh of Marsh & Baxter Limited. This was converted to a hotel about the beginning of the 21st century.

== Gibbet Wood ==
In December 1812 Benjamin Robins of Dunsley Hall was murdered while walking home from Stourbridge. His killer William Howe, alias John Wood, was arrested in London and executed at Stafford the following year. His corpse was hung on a gibbet at the scene of the crime for twelve months, giving rise to the names of nearby Gibbet Wood and Gibbet Lane that runs through it.
