= The Arcadian Kicks =

British indie rock band

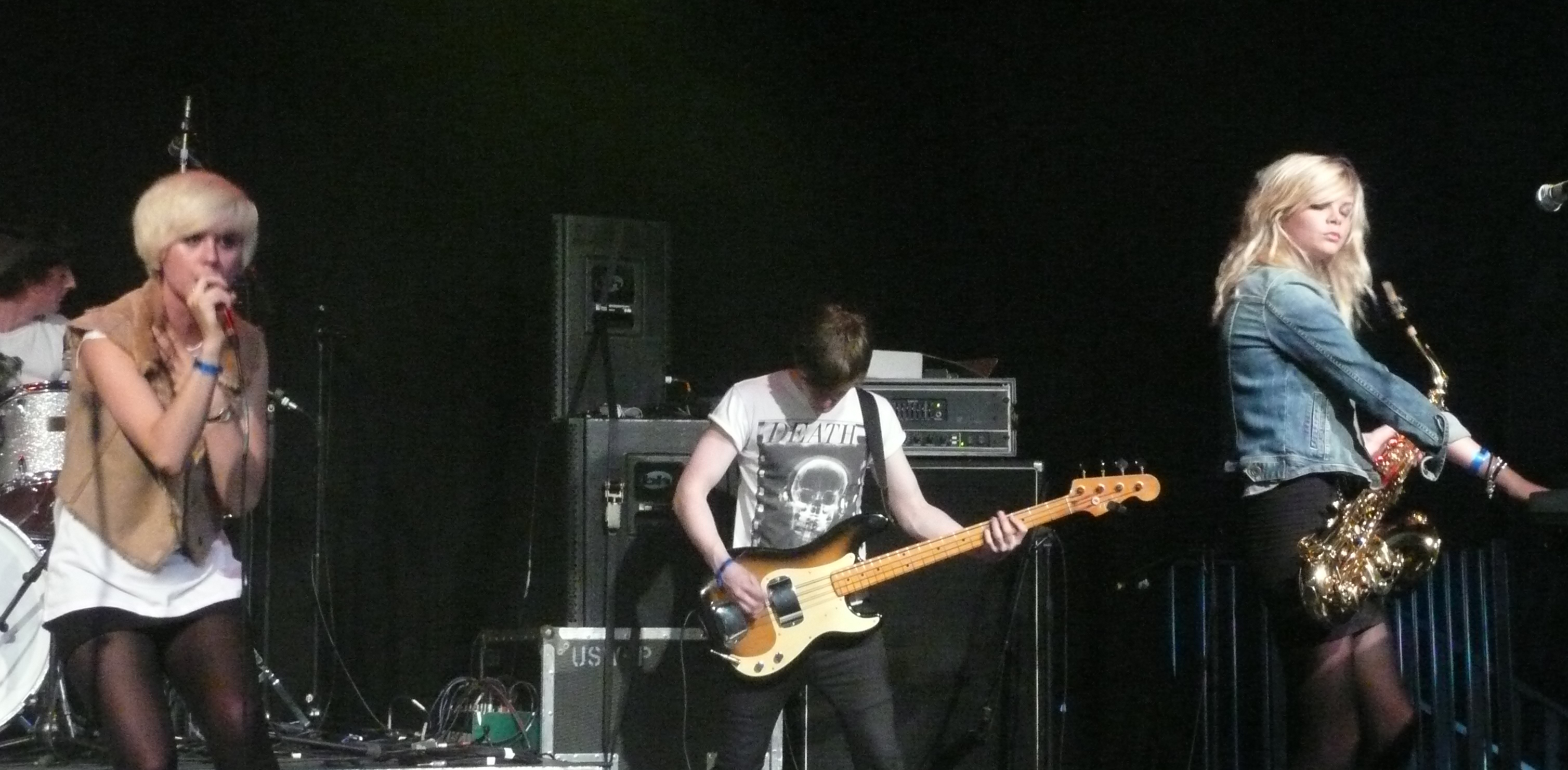
- Performing at the 2011 Wychwood Festival

Background information
- Origin: Kinver, Staffordshire
- Genre: Indie rock
- Years active: 2006–
- Label: One Beat Records
- Members: Rebecca Wilson (vocals); Rebekah Pennington (keyboard, saxophone, vocals); Thomas Holloway (guitar); Tommy Kelly (bass); Harry Grainger (drums)

The Arcadian Kicks were an indie rock band from Kinver in South Staffordshire (near Stourbridge), who formed in 2006. They have described their sound as "Spectoresque, Fleetwood Mac, Led Zeppelin... a bit of light shoegaze and Yeah Yeah Yeahs mixed up". They finished recording their debut album, Making Lovers, in 2010.

== History ==
The band formed in early 2006 when the bandmates were studying for GCSEs at Edgecliff High School in Kinver. They are co-managed by Ian Light and Jon Brookes, the drummer of The Charlatans. Brookes was a judge at the Surface Unsigned battle of the bands that they took part in, and after watching another of their gigs he offered to manage them.

"Making this record was right up there with the best work I've done. Any time you get to work with kids who have their kind of skills, you are reminded on a daily basis of why you got into this business in the first place."

— Mike Chapman

In 2009/10, they recorded their self-financed debut album at Vale Studios in Worcestershire in a two-week session; it was produced and mixed by Mike Chapman who produced records for Blondie, and who came across their music on MySpace. They plan to record with Chapman again in January 2011. They released their single "19 Days" in August 2010. They write their songs collectively. Wilson and Pennington later broke off from the group and founded Ekkah, producing post-Disco 1980s R&B.

=== Performances ===
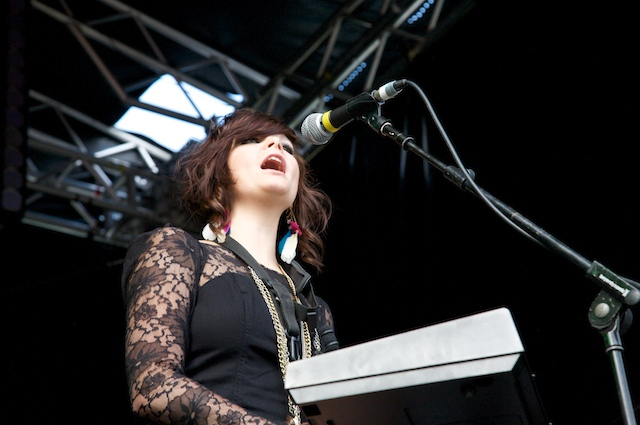
Rebekah at the Isle of Wight Festival

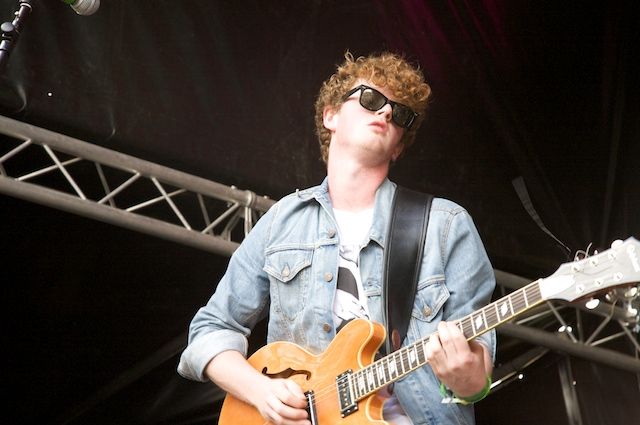
Thomas at the Isle of Wight Festival

They run and regularly play at the Syndicate Club Night at The Sound Bar in Birmingham (originally at Bash Bar and then the Sunflower Lounge). In September 2008 they played at KerrangFest (part of ArtsFest) in Birmingham, and in November 2009 they played live on BBC Radio WM Introducing. In 2010 they performed at T in the Park on the BBC Introducing stage, the Wychwood Festival, Napa Live in Ayia Napa, and made their third appearance at the Isle of Wight Festival. They played KerrangFest again in September 2010.

== Reception ==
Artrocker called them "a fairly tradional [sic] angst-pop band, boosted by some unexpected sax solos, ... soulful hollering, [and] some interestingly growly guitars." Reviewing them live in 2008, they said that they "play rattle and roll with a Zeppelin style commitment to excellent musicianship. Many of their tunes start out sounding traditional, morph into a psychedelic middle sections, then come out growling like werewolves at the other end." Glasswerk said of "19 Days" that "the track appears to remain on one level, seemingly lacking any conviction from the musicians who are behind it... other tracks ... far outshine '19 Days'." "19 Days" has been played on BBC Radio 2 by Radcliffe & Maconie and Bob Harris. Popped Music said of "Black and White" that "you have a sound that is altogether quite different from your average indie band."
