= Stourton, Staffordshire =

Hamlet in Staffordshire, England

Coordinates: 52.46727°N 2.20015°W

Stourton
- Location within Staffordshire
- OS grid reference: SO865855
- District: South Staffordshire
- Shire county: Staffordshire
- Region: West Midlands
- Country: England
- Sovereign state: United Kingdom
- Post town: STOURBRIDGE
- Postcode district: DY7
- Police: Staffordshire
- Fire: Staffordshire
- Ambulance: West Midlands
- UK Parliament: Kingswinford and South Staffordshire

Stourton is a hamlet in South Staffordshire, England 2.5 miles to the northwest of Stourbridge. There is a fair amount of dispute over the pronunciation, being pronounced 'stower-ton', 'stir-ton' or 'store-ton' by different people from the area. The nearest sizeable villages are Wollaston and Kinver, the nearest hamlets are Prestwood and Dunsley. It lies on the River Stour. The Staffordshire and Worcestershire Canal and Stourbridge Canal meet at Stourton Junction, which places Stourton on the Stourport Ring, a navigable waterway popular with narrowboat holidaymakers.

Stourton is situated either side of the A458 road, at the junction of the A449 between Wolverhampton and Kidderminster. The name, originally related to the area west of the River Stour, is now applied as including the area east (and south) of the river, which was formerly the township of Halfcot. The Stewponey Inn was formerly situated at the cross roads, until it was demolished to make way for housing. Stewponey remains a local name for the location.

== Stourton Castle ==
Believed to be a medieval hunting lodge dating from the reign of King William II. Stourton Castle was evidently 'the King's Houses' in Kinver during the reign of King Henry II. It was called a castle in 1122. By that time, the castle and the manor of Kinver and Stourton, together with the custody of the forest of Kinver were held by John son of Philip at a fee farm rent of £9. The king resumed possession of the manor in 1293 and granted it back to John (probably the other's grandson) for life. The king granted the keepership of the forest to Hugh Tyrel in 1339, adding the manor in 1340, but the property was in wardship from 1343 until the majority of another Hugh Tyrel in 1362. Following his death in 1381, the property passed to Richard Hampton. It passed down his family until the death of his great-grandson John Hampton in 1472.

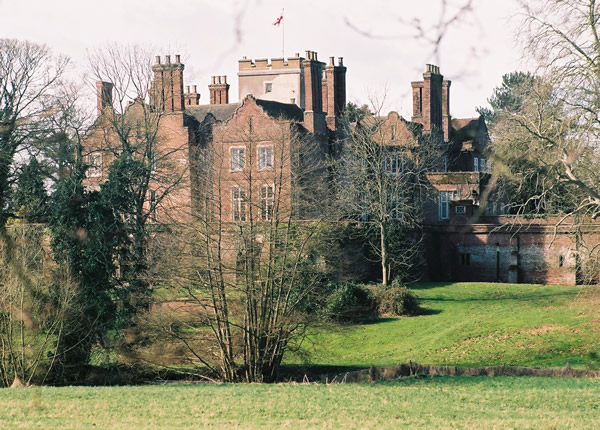
Stourton Castle

The castle and manor then passed to George, Duke of Clarence, who in 1475 gave it to Tewkesbury Abbey, who returned it to the crown in 1495. The Castle was the birthplace of Cardinal Pole, whose maternal grandfather, Clarence, was the brother of both King Edward IV, and King Richard III.

The castle and manor were granted by Henry VIII to his Attorney General, William Whorwood, whose family owned the manor of Compton, also in Kinver. The castle then became a home of that family until the late 1650s. The present house was presumably built by Thomas Whorwood when he became entitled to the whole of the manor in the 1580s. His grandson John Whorwood was probably neutral in the Civil War, but the castle was taken and briefly held by the brother of Colonel Tinker Fox in 1644, and later surrendered to Sir Gilbert Gerard, the Governor of Worcester after he routed Fox's relief column in an action on Stourbridge Heath.

Wortley Whorwood (John's grandson) sold the manor and castle to Thomas Foley and his son Philip in 1672 and soon after it settled on Philip. The property belonged to his descendants until the estate was broken up in 1913, the Foleys never lived in the castle however, choosing to reside at nearby Prestwood. The castle was occupied as a farm house throughout the 18th century and from 1805 by T. W. Grazebrook, a local glass manufacturer.

The house was remodelled and partially rebuilt in 1832-3 by Sir Robert Smirke for the industrialist James Foster. His nephew William Orme Foster lived there until 1868, when he sold the lease. Around 1890, Martha Steer (née Nettlefold) took it on lease for herself, her daughter, Ethel Steer, and the Wymans with their family of young children. The castle was vacant from the death of George Arkle until the sale of the Prestwood estate in 1913. It was bought by Francis Grazebrook, a relative of the earlier tenant, and remained in the family until the death of his son O. F. Grazebrooke in 1974. The 19th century main front incorporates a late medieval gate tower.

== Stourton Junction ==
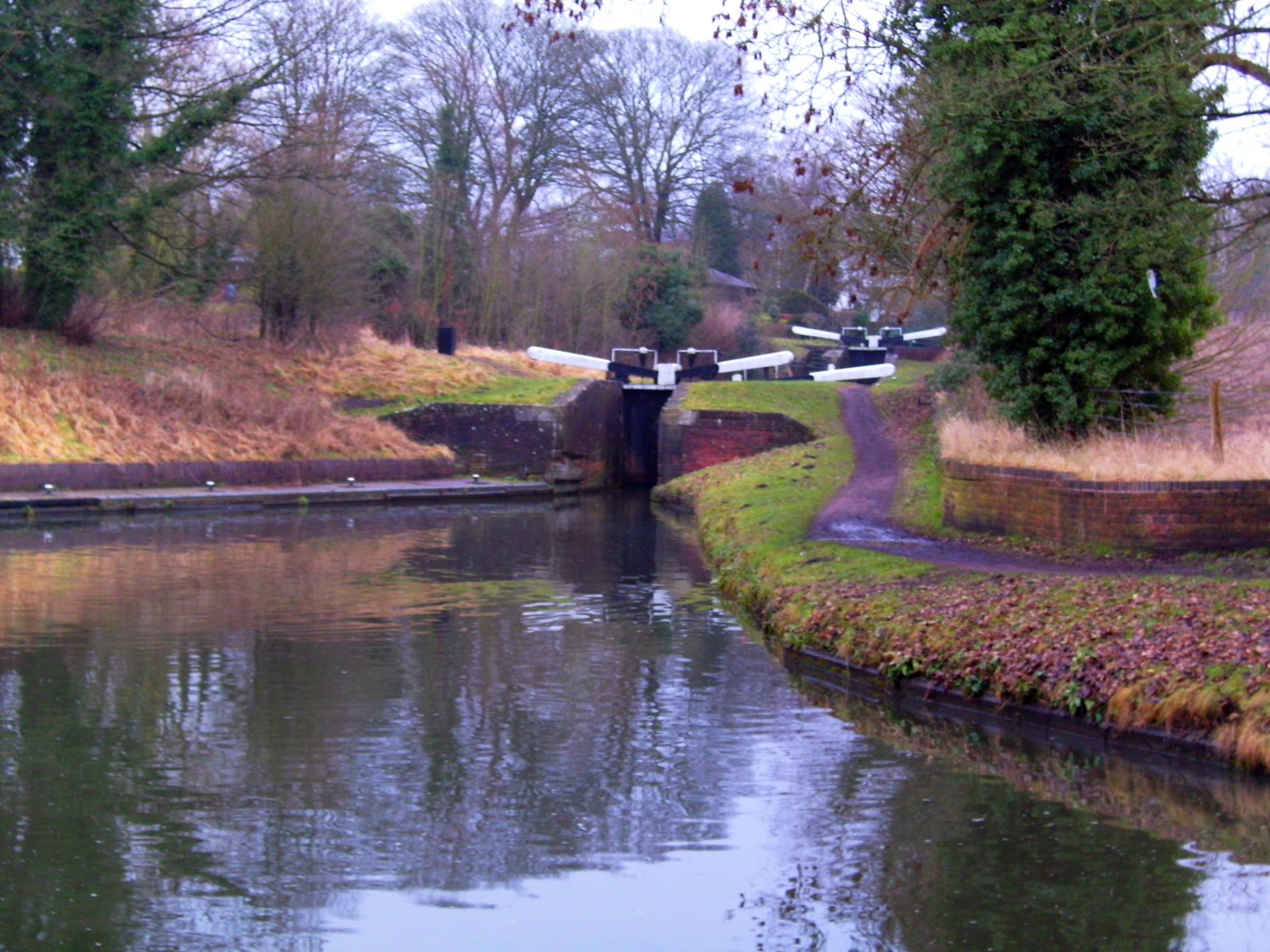
Stourton Junction: the Stourbridge Canal descends through locks to meet the Staffordshire and Worcestershire.

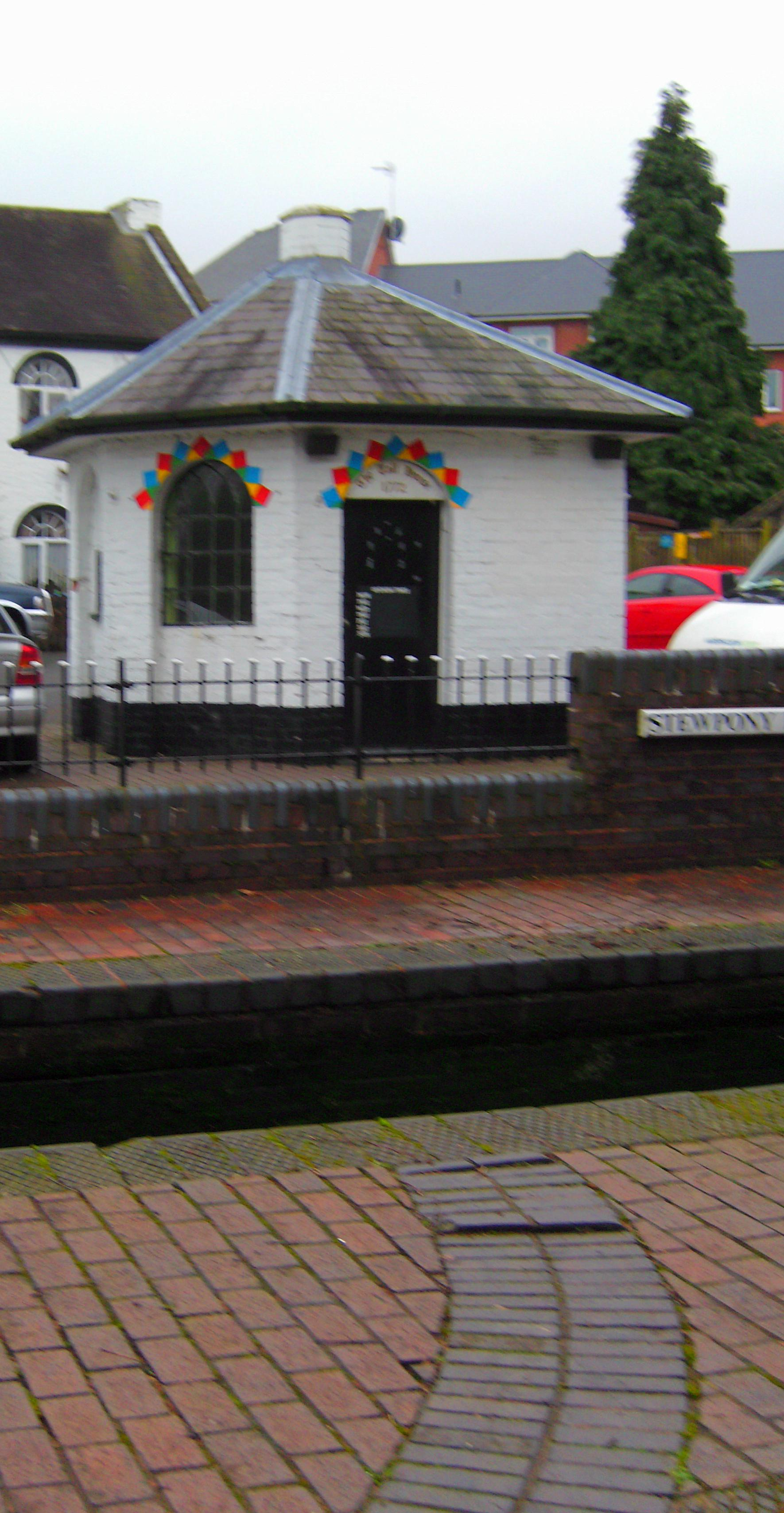
The old toll house at Stewpony Lock.

Stourton Junction is the point at which the Stourbridge Canal terminates by descending through locks to join the Staffordshire and Worcestershire Canal. This historically important junction on the West Midlands canal network was long disused, but the restoration and reopening of the Stourbridge Canal, from the 1970s onwards, has reasserted its importance. It lies a few hundred metres to the north of the crossroads at Stewponey, and is easily accessed by towpaths along both canals.

== Stewponey ==
The Stewponey public house and Foley Arms Hotel stood at the centre of Stourton at the junction of the A449 and Stourbridge-bound A458, immediately adjacent to the locks and bridges. It was rebuilt in the 1930s, and featured an outdoor swimming pool. It replaced an 18th-century inn, which was much smaller and outdated, but is known to have existed in 1744, when it was called the house of Benjamin Hallen, being the sign of the Green Man and called the Stewponey. The hotel was also rebuilt to provide more space for the parking of motor cars. It was a local landmark in the late 20th century. By 1999, however, its owners had decided to sell it to property developers and it was demolished in 2001 to be redeveloped for executive private housing, which has retained the name Stewponey.

The origin of the name "Stewponey Inn" remains uncertain. Rev. Sabine Baring Gould claimed that Stewponey was said to have been a local pronunciation of "Estepona" and that the Estepona Tavern was so named because the founder of the tavern had been a soldier quartered in Estepona in Spain and his wife had come from there. Other suggestions include it being a corruption of Stouri pons (Latin for "bridge of Stour"), or that it derives from stepony.

The Inn gave its name, Stewponey or Stewpony, to the nearby locks and bridge on the Staffordshire and Worcestershire Canal, below Stourton Junction. Beside them stand the Stewponey tollhouse, a brick structure of irregular octagonal plan, which is painted white. The original Georgian brick bridge was complemented in the 20th century by a modern road bridge. The entry to the towpath is still an important access point to the canal for walkers and there is parking immediately opposite for this purpose.

== Stourton Park ==
Stourton Park is the homeground of Stourbridge R.F.C.

== See also ==
- Kinver Light Railway which passed through Stourton (1901–1930)
- Listed buildings in Kinver
