= Listed buildings in Kinver =

Kinver is a civil parish in the district of South Staffordshire, Staffordshire, England. It contains 54 listed buildings that are recorded in the National Heritage List for England. Of these, one is listed at Grade I, the highest of the three grades, one is at Grade II*, the middle grade, and the others are at Grade II, the lowest grade. The parish contains the village of Kinver, the smaller settlement of Stourton, and the surrounding area. The Stourbridge Canal joins the Staffordshire and Worcestershire Canal in the parish, and listed buildings associated with these canals include locks, a toll house, a bridge, and canal workers' cottages. Most of the other listed buildings are houses and associated structures, cottages, shop, farmhouses and farm buildings, the earliest of which are timber framed or have a timber-framed core. The other listed buildings include a church, former schools, public houses, a former windmill, a malthouse, lodges, a milepost, a war memorial, and a telephone kiosk.

== Key ==
Grade	Criteria
I	Buildings of exceptional interest, sometimes considered to be internationally important
II*	Particularly important buildings of more than special interest
II	Buildings of national importance and special interest

== Buildings ==
Name and location	Photograph	Date	Notes	Grade
St Peter's Church; 52.44524°N 2.22785°W		Early 14th century	The church, which contains some 12th-century fragments, was extended in the 15th century and restored in 1884–85 by George Gilbert Scott and John Oldrid Scott, and the north aisle was rebuilt in 1976. The church is built in stone with tile roofs, and consists of a nave, north and south aisles, a south porch, a chancel with north and south chapels, and a west tower. The tower has four stages, diagonal buttresses, a west doorway with a pointed arch, a three-light west window, and an embattled parapet.	I
Dovecote, Whittington Hall; 52.44090°N 2.20992°W	—	Medieval	Additions were made to the dovecote in the 18th century. It is in red brick on a stone plinth with a circular plan, and a conical tile roof with a weathervane.	II
Holbein House, 30 and 31 High Street, Kinver; 52.44791°N 2.22826°W	—	15th century	A house incorporating two shops, it was extended to the rear in the 17th century, and restored in the 20th century. It is timber framed, encased in brick at the front of the ground floor, and has a tile roof. There are two storeys, the upper storey jettied, and a T-shaped plan consisting of a two-bay front range and a single-bay rear extension. In the ground floor are two shop fronts with plate glass windows, and to the right is an entry. The upper floor contains two five-light mullioned windows.	II
Annex, Ye Olde White Harte; 52.44797°N 2.22890°W	—	15th or 16th century (probable)	The annex to the public house was remodelled and partly rebuilt in the 17th century. It is timber framed with rebuilding in brick, painted, and has a tile roof. There are two storeys, a floor band, and two gabled bays. In the ground floor steps lead up to a doorway on the left, and to the right is a bay window. The upper floor contains casement windows with segmental heads. In the gable in the left return is exposed timber framing.	II
112 High Street, Kinver; 52.44781°N 2.22853°W	—	Late 16th century	The house, which was later altered and extended, has a timber framed core, and has been rendered and roughcast. The front facing the street is gabled and has two storeys and one bay. In the ground floor is a 19th-century shop front, and in the upper floor is a canted bay window with decorative pilasters and a cornice on moulded brackets. Inside, there is exposed timber framing.	II
Dunsley Hall; 52.45592°N 2.20975°W	—	Late 16th century	The house, which has been altered, extended and remodelled, has a timber framed core. The outer walls are rebuilt in brick, the extensions are in brick, and the roof is tiled. There are two storeys, a three-bay hall range, and flanking gabled wings. In the centre is a porch that has a four-centred arched doorway with panelled spandrels and a hood mould. The windows are mullioned with hood moulds. Inside, there is exposed timber framing.	II
Whittington Inn; 52.44321°N 2.21204°W		Late 16th century	A private house, later a public house, it is timber framed with painted brick infill, some repairs in brick, and a tile roof. There are two storeys and an attic, two parallel ranges of four bays, a later north range, and a northeast wing. On the front are two gables, between them is a gabled two-storey porch with a segmental arch, and on each side are two gables. The windows are casements with lattice glazing.	II*
Ye Olde Grammar School; 52.44625°N 2.22431°W		Late 16th century	The former school, later a house, which incorporates some earlier material, was extended in the 1830s, and restored in the 1970s. The original part is timber framed, and has a tile roof hipped to the right. There are two storeys and an attic, the upper storey and attic continuously jettied, and two bays. The central gabled cast iron porch is approached by a flight of steps, and the windows are casements on moulded brackets. The extension to the right is in rendered brick with a slate roof; the front facing the road is gabled with one bay, two storeys, and sash windows.	II
17 High Street, Kinver; 52.44730°N 2.22697°W		17th century	The house, which was restored in the 20th century, is timber framed with some rebuilding in brick, and with a tile roof. There are two storeys and three bays. The windows are mullioned, those in the ground floor projecting on brackets, and to the right is a carriage entry.	II
18, 19 and 20 High Street, Kinver; 52.44736°N 2.22711°W		17th century	A row of houses that was extended in the 18th century. The original part is timber framed, and partly rebuilt in brick, and the extension to the right, No. 18, is in painted brick. Both parts have two storeys and a tile roof. The original part has two bays, the upper storey is jettied, and the windows are casements. The extension has four bays, the left bay projecting, gabled, and containing s door with a rectangular fanlight. The windows are casements, those above and to the right of the door with segmental heads, and further to the right are garage doors.	II
Clifford Cottage, Church Hill; 52.44646°N 2.22530°W		17th century	A timber framed house with painted brick infill and a tile roof. There is one storey and an attic, and two bays. The windows are latticed casements, and there are two gabled dormers.	II
Ye Olde White Harte; 52.44788°N 2.22866°W		17th century	The public house is a remodelling of an earlier house, and it was altered in the 19th century. It is in red brick, painted on the front and partly rendered, and with a floor band and a tile roof. There are two storeys and an L-shaped plan, consisting of a four-bay front range and a rear wing. The front bays are gabled, the right gable larger. The doorway has a semicircular hood on brackets, the windows are casements with segmental heads, and in the right return is an exposed roof truss.	II
Holland House; 52.47662°N 2.19204°W	—	Late 17th century	A farmhouse, later a private house, it was remodelled and extended in about 1840. The house is in red brick, and has a tile roof with shaped gables. There are two storeys, a main range of three bays, and two rear wings with later extensions. The windows are mullioned with casements. On the west front is a stone bench with piers and shaped brackets carrying a hipped roof.	II
Whittington Old House; 52.44323°N 2.21519°W	—	Late 17th century	The house, which was partly rebuilt in the 18th century, is timber framed with brick infill, partly replaced in brick, and with a tile roof. There is one storey and an attic, on a sandstone plinth, with a dentilled eaves band, and two rear wings. The front range has two bays, and contains a central doorway with a segmental head approached by a flight of steps. The windows are casements with segmental heads, and there are two gabled dormers.	II
47 High Street, Kinver; 52.44866°N 2.22909°W	—	1690	A house incorporating shops that has been altered, it is timber framed with brick infill, rendered at the front, with a tile roof. There are two storeys and an attic, three bays, and a 19th-century rear wing forming an L-shaped plan. In the ground floor are two shop fronts, the right shop front with a bow window, and to the left is a doorway and garage doors. The windows are casements, and at the rear and internally is exposed timber framing.	II
38 and 39 High Street, Kinver; 52.44814°N 2.22874°W	—	Early 18th century	A house later altered and divided into two shops, the building is in red brick with storey bands, an eaves band, and a tile roof. There are two storeys and attics, and five bays. In the centre is a doorway with a semicircular pediment hood on brackets, and this is flanked by Victorian shop fronts. The upper floors contain a mix of sash and casement windows, and there are three gabled dormers.	II
123 and 124 High Street, Kinver; 52.44721°N 2.22715°W	—	Early 18th century	A pair of red brick houses with dentilled eaves bands, and a tile roof with shaped gables. There are two storeys and an attic, and three bays. The left doorway has a flat hood, the right doorway has a segmental head, the windows are casements, and there are three gabled dormers.	II
Church Hill House, coach house, gates and railings 52.44539°N 2.22437°W	—	Early 18th century	A red brick house that has giant corner pilasters not reaching the top floor, a plain parapet with moulded coping, and a hipped slate roof. There are three storeys and five bays. The central doorway has Ionic pilasters, a fanlight, and a moulded cornice hood. The windows are sashes with moulded sills and raised fluted keystones. To the right is the former coach house that has two storeys and two bays. In the ground floor are garage doors, and the upper floor contains semicircular-headed windows. The forecourt at the front of the house is enclosed by wrought iron gates and railings.	II
Cliffside, 125 High Street, Kinver; 52.44709°N 2.22689°W	—	Early 18th century	A house in painted brick with giant angle pilasters, a moulded eaves cornice, and a tile roof. There are three storeys and three bays, the middle bay slightly projecting under a pediment containing a blind quatrefoil. In the centre is a doorway with a panelled architrave and a bracketed pediment, and the windows are sashes with lintels and keystones.	II
Compton Hall Farmhouse; 52.45595°N 2.27519°W	—	Early 18th century	The farmhouse is in red brick with floor bands and a tile roof. There are two storeys and an attic, and a T-shaped plan, consisting of a main range of three bays, a rear wing, and a later extension in the angle. The central doorway has a triangular hood, the windows are sashes with wedge lintels, and there are two gabled dormers.	II
Stourton House; 52.46406°N 2.21491°W	—	Early 18th century	A farmhouse, later a private house, it was altered and extended in the 20th century. The house is in red and blue brick, with a dentilled eaves band and a tile roof. There are two storeys and an attic, two parallel ranges, a front of three bays, and a 20th-century extension to the south. The central bay is gabled, with a lunette in the attic, and the other windows are casements with segmental heads. The doorway has a segmental head and a keystone.	II
Whittington Hall; 52.44122°N 2.20976°W	—	Early 18th century	A red brick farmhouse with a floor band, a plain parapet, and a tile roof. There are two storeys, a range with a front of seven bays and sides of two bays, and two rear wings. The central doorway has a gabled hood on brackets, and the windows are sashes.	II
Willow Hill, Vicarage Drive; 52.44788°N 2.22978°W	—	Early 18th century	A red brick house with storey bands and a tile roof. There are two storeys and an attic, three bays, a single-storey extension to the right, and a two-storey extension behind it with a corner pilaster strip and an embattled parapet. A flight of steps leads up to a central doorway, the windows are casements and there are two gabled dormers.	II
28 and 29 High Street, Kinver; 52.44783°N 2.22808°W		Early to mid 18th century	A house incorporating two shops, in red brick with a tile roof, two storeys and six bays, a parapet cornice, and a plain parapet. The middle two bay project under a pediment containing a keyed oculus. In the centre, steps lead up to a doorway that has engaged columns with palmette capitals, a rectangular fanlight, and a pediment. The doorway is flanked by sash windows with semicircular heads. The outer bays contain five-bay Victorian shop fronts with console brackets, central recessed doors, and window lights with semicircular heads. The upper floor contains sash windows with decorative plaster lintels and reeded keystones.	II
Old Windmill; 52.48664°N 2.22944°W		18th century	The windmill, now a ruin, is in red brick, partly rendered, and has three storeys. There are doors on the east and west sides, square window openings, and no roof.	II
Stourton Farmhouse; 52.46784°N 2.21290°W	—	Mid 18th century	A farmhouse, later a private house, it was altered in the 19th century, and extended in the 20th century. It is in red brick with corner pilasters, storey bands, a dentilled eaves band, and a tile roof with coped verges. There are two storeys and an attic, and a T-shaped plan with a main block of two bays, a rear staircase wing, and a single-storey gabled extension on the right. The windows are casements, and there are two gabled dormers.	II
Spittlebrook Mill Farmhouse; 52.48744°N 2.22971°W	—	Mid to late 18th century	A red brick farmhouse with a hipped tile roof, three storeys, and three bays. The central doorway has pilasters, a fanlight with Gothic glazing bars, and a pediment. The windows on the front are sashes, those in the middle bay are blind, and at the rear are casement windows and a tall stair window.	II
Brindley Hall; 52.45848°N 2.26400°W	—	Late 18th century	The house, which was extended in the 19th century, is in red brick with a sill band, a corbelled eaves cornice, and a slate roof. There are three storeys and three bays, the middle bay projecting and containing a semi-octagonal porch, a doorway with pilasters, a fanlight, a pediment, and a cornice surmounted by a statue of an eagle. In the outer bays are two-storey canted bay windows containing pilasters and sash windows, those in the centre with architraves. The windows in the top floor have segmental lintels and fluted keystones. To the left is a later single-storey polygonal extension with a hipped roof.	II
Former coach house and stables, mounting block and horse trough, Brindley Hall; 52.45885°N 2.26409°W	—	Late 18th century	The former coach house and stables are in red brick with tile roofs, and form an L-shaped plan with two ranges at right angles, both with two storeys and three bays. The south range has a plinth, a loft and a dentilled eaves band. The central bay has a round-headed carriage arch with impost bands, and pilaster buttresses, and above it is a pediment with an oculus. The outer bays contain lunettes in the ground floor and casement windows above. To the left of the arch is a stone stepped mounting block, and to the right is a stone horse trough. The east range has a porte-cochère on cast iron columns with a central carriage arch and a clock in the pediment.	II
Dovecote, Hyde Farm; 52.45801°N 2.22267°W	—	Late 18th century	The dovecote is in red brick and has a hipped tile roof with a central louvre. There is a hexagonal plan, two storeys, a floor band, and a moulded stone eaves cornice. The dovecote contains a blocked cart entrance with a rounded segmental arch and an inserted door.	II
Kinver House; 52.44607°N 2.22396°W	—	Late 18th century	The house, which was remodelled in about 1900, is in painted brick with a slate roof. There are two storeys and an attic, and three bays. The middle bay is recessed and contains a porch with a pediment, and a semicircular arch, flanked by fluted columns, and the door has a fanlight. The outer bays contain two-storey canted bay windows with storey bands and dentilled cornices.	II
Barn, Stourton Farm; 52.46806°N 2.21312°W	—	Late 18th century	The barn is in red brick and has a tile roof with crow-stepped gables. There is an L-shaped plan, a single storey, and a loft over the wing. The barn contains full-height barn doors, a segmental-headed loft door, fixed windows and air vents.	II
Pair of canal locks, Stourton Junction; 52.46383°N 2.20429°W		Late 18th century	The locks are on the Stourbridge Canal near its junction with the Staffordshire and Worcestershire Canal, and are in brick with stone coping.	II
Stourton Lock No. 1; 52.46468°N 2.19921°W		Late 18th century	The lock on the Stourbridge Canal has a brick chamber, with some engineering brick and some stone copings. At the top is a single wooden gate, at the bottom are double wooden gates, and on the towpath side are steps.	II
Stourton Lock No. 2; 52.46397°N 2.20157°W		Late 18th century	The lock on the Stourbridge Canal has a brick chamber with brick and stone copings. At the top is a single wooden gate, and at the bottom are double wooden gates.	II
Sugar Loaf Farmhouse; 52.43481°N 2.17731°W	—	Late 18th century	The farmhouse is in red brick with a dentilled eaves band and a tile roof. There are three storeys and three bays. The doorway has a rectangular fanlight, the windows on the front are sashes, and elsewhere there are casement windows.	II
Barn, Union Hall Farm; 52.46018°N 2.26303°W	—	c 1800	A red brick barn with a tile roof, one storey and four bays. It contains full-height barn doors, a stable door, and air vents.	II
Malthouse behind 28 and 28 High Street, Kinver; 52.44790°N 2.22783°W	—	c 1816	The malthouse is in brick with a clay roof. There are four bays, and it contains windows on the east front and vents under the eaves. Inside the roof are upper base-cruck trusses.	II
Toll House, Stewponey Lock; 52.46155°N 2.20531°W		Early 19th century	The toll house is in painted brick with a hipped slate roof. It has one storey and an octagonal plan. On the sides are recessed semicircular arches, one containing the doorway, and the others have windows with Gothic tracery.	II
Tail Bridge, Stourton Lock No. 2; 52.46395°N 2.20182°W		Early 19th century	A footbridge over the bottom of the lock, it is in cast iron.	II
The Fox Inn; 52.46558°N 2.23431°W		Early 19th century	The public house is in painted red brick, with a dentilled eaves band, and a tile roof with coped verges. There are two storeys and an attic, and three bays. The central doorway has a gabled hood. The windows are sashes with stepped lintels grooved as voussoirs, and there are three dormers.	II
Stourton Castle; 52.46217°N 2.20864°W		1832–33	A large house on the site of a medieval castle, it was remodelled and largely rebuilt, incorporating some medieval and 16th-century material. The house is in red brick and has tile roofs with shaped gables. The west front incorporates a medieval gate tower, and the other three ranges enclose a courtyard, formerly open, and later roofed over. The tower has three storeys, a pointed entrance, and an embattled parapet, and the rest of the west front has two storeys and a plain parapet. Most of the windows are mullioned and transomed with raised surrounds, some with gables, and there are false arrowslits.	II
Chapel and terrace retaining walls, Stourton Castle; 52.46208°N 2.20829°W	—	Early to mid 19th century	The walls are in red brick with stone dressings and they support the terrace on the north, south, and east sides. At the left end is a circular pier with a conical cap and a ball finial. The chapel is beneath the southeast angle of the terrace, and has a central door with a pointed head flanked by windows, also with pointed heads.	II
Coach house, stable block and walls, Stourton Castle; 52.46215°N 2.20997°W	—	Early to mid 19th century	The coach house and stable block are in red brick and have hipped tile roofs. There are three ranges around the west, south and east sides of a courtyard. The south range has nine bays, the middle three bays with two storeys, and containing a carriageway with a four-centred arch, a moulded parapet band, and a plain parapet. The outer bays, and the other ranges have one storey and attics. The west and east ranges have five bays, and in the central bay of each is a four-centred carriage archway with a circular opening above and a shaped gable, and flanked by doorways. Most of the windows are casements, and there are dormers in the attics. Garden walls are attached to the northwest and southwest angles.	II
Riverside, 21 High Street, Kinver; 52.44744°N 2.22723°W	—	Early to mid 19th century	A red brick house with a dentilled cornice and a tile roof. There are two storeys, three bays, and a single-storey single-bay wing to the left. The central doorway has engaged columns and an entablature, and the windows are sashes with fluted segmental lintels.	II
Canal House, Stewponey Lock; 52.46191°N 2.20520°W		Early to mid 19th century	The houses, facing the Staffordshire and Worcestershire Canal, are in painted brick with tile roofs. The house on the left has two storeys and three bays, and contains casement windows with stepped lintels grooved as voussoirs. The doorway has an architrave and a cornice hood. The house on the right is recessed, and has three storeys, one bay, sash windows, and a doorway with a cornice hood.	II
The Gate House, walls and piers 52.46166°N 2.21022°W		1838	The lodge at the entrance to the drive to Stourton Castle is in red brick, and in Gothic style. It has an L-shaped plan, with an octagonal two-storey tower at the front with a string course and an embattled parapet. The windows are casements with hood moulds, and at the rear a porch links the octagonal tower to a square tower. Attached to the octagonal tower are brick walls with cast iron coping, to the right is a pedestrian entrance with a four-centred arch, and beyond this is a pair of square gate piers with acorn finials.	II
Entrance lodge, Lawnswood House; 52.48279°N 2.18114°W	—	1839	The lodge at the entrance to the drive is in rendered brick with a slate roof, and is in Italianate style. There is a single storey and a roughly cruciform plan, and an octagonal turret to the north. On the front is a projecting porch with a pediment and a recessed doorway with a cornice on consoles. To the northeast is a bay window with a hipped roof. At the entrance to the drive are curved walls and gate piers.	II
Stable range, Lawnswood House; 52.48388°N 2.18197°W	—	1839	The stable range, with an attached domestic range, is in brick with slate roofs. The stable range consists of three ranges surrounding a courtyard, and there is a domestic building at the southeast. The north and west ranges have one storey, and at the northeast corner of the north range is a tower. The east range has two storeys, and further to the south is an L-shaped domestic building with a bay window and a casement window above.	II
Rockmount; 52.44646°N 2.22323°W	—	c. 1840	A stuccoed house with a rear wing in painted brick and a slate roof. There are two storeys, and a symmetrical front of three bays with two gables that have ornate pierced bargeboards and pendants. The centre is recessed and contains a doorway with a four-centred arch and a fanlight. Most of the windows are sashes with hood moulds, and there are French casement windows. At the rear is a wing with multi-pane cast iron windows.	II
Foley Infants School and School House; 52.45179°N 2.23001°W	—	1850	The former school and school house have been converted into two houses. They are in red brick with stone dressings, they have a slate roof with coped verges, and are in Gothic style. The former school has one storey on a plinth, and five bays. On the front are three gables, each containing a window with a pointed segmental head, and on the middle gable is a bellcote. The house has a square tower to the left with two storeys and an attic, a pyramidal roof, and a canted bay window with a hipped roof. The other windows have segmental pointed heads, and to the right is a single-story single-bay wing with a gabled dormer.	II
Milepost at NGR SO 8413 8540; 52.46660°N 2.23494°W	—	Late 19th century	The milepost is on the northeast side of the A548 road. It is in cast iron, and has a triangular section and a chamfered top. On the top is the distance to London, and on the lower faces are the distances to Stourbridge and to "BRID" (Bridgnorth).	II
Kinver War Memorial; 52.44450°N 2.23922°W		c. 1920	The war memorial is on Kinver Edge. It is in granite, and consists of an obelisk with a square plan, on a pedestal, on a stone step. On the front of the pedestal is a drinking fountain, and above it is an inscription. On the sides of the pedestal are the names of those lost in the First World War, and on the front of the obelisk is an inscription and the names of those lost in the Second World War.	II
Telephone kiosk, High Street, Kinver; 52.44758°N 2.22792°W	—	1935	A K6 type telephone kiosk, designed by Giles Gilbert Scott. Constructed in cast iron with a square plan and a dome, it has three unperforated crowns in the top panels.	II
