= The Musgraves =

- Origin: Birmingham, England
- Genres: Roots Music
- Years active: 2011–2015
- Members: Matthew Bennett (vocals, guitars, banjo, mandolin, ukulele); Matt Foundling (piano, keyboards, vocals); Tom Farnell Jr (drums, percussion); Lesley-Marie Turner (violin, ukulele, glockenspiel, vocals)

The Musgraves was a British roots-pop band. The band consisted of Matthew Bennett (vocals, guitars, banjo, mandolin, ukulele), Matt Foundling (piano, keyboards, vocals), Tom Farnell Jr (drums, percussion), and Lesley-Marie Turner (violin, ukulele, glockenspiel, vocals). The band was based in Birmingham, England, with members from Wolverhampton, Hull and Birmingham.

== Career ==
The band gained popularity in 2011 with their EP Lost in Familiarity, featuring four songs: "So Sofia"; "Back To Me"; "Discover Me"; and "Fortune Teller". "So Sofia" won support from BBC 6Music and was first played by Tom Robinson. It also won praise from Q Magazine and was featured as a 'Q The Music Track of the Day'.

An instrumental version of "Discover Me" was used as the sound bed for the BT (British Telecom) Wedding, part of a television advertising campaign that followed a fictional couple from their initial meeting through to their wedding day. The Wedding advert premiered during 'Britain’s Got Talent' a week before the official wedding of Prince William and Kate Middleton. They then appeared on BBC Radio WM Introducing.

The Musgraves debut single, "Last of Me" (released digitally in March 2012), was first championed by Graham Norton on his BBC Radio 2 show. Before appearing on The Graham Norton Show, televised on 3 February 2012, the band had their van containing all of their equipment stolen on Sunday 29 January 2012 from Lichfield. Staffordshire Police are presently investigating the theft of the Mercedes-Benz Sprinter van. The first unsigned band to play the show, the band played the set with borrowed equipment and clothes.
