= Kinver =

Large village in Staffordshire, England

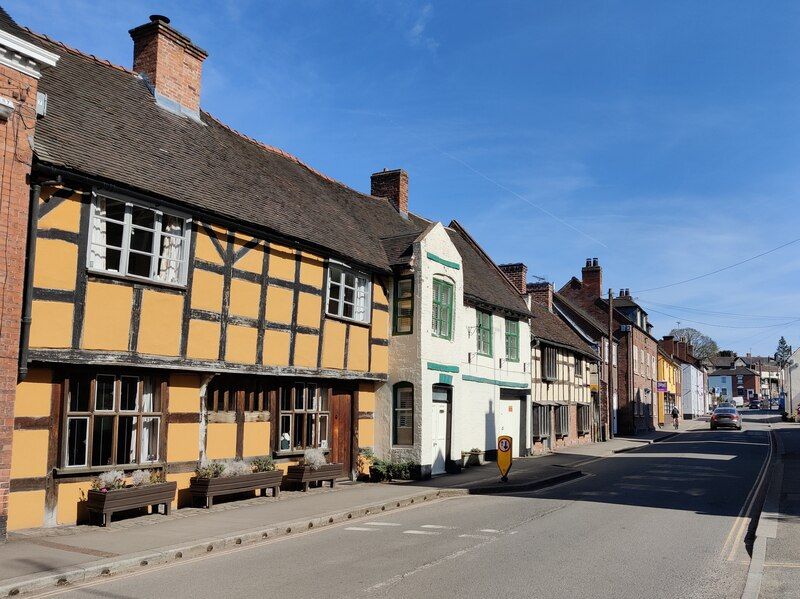
- Kinver High Street

- Location within Staffordshire
- Population: 7,225 (Kinver Ward) (2011 Census)
- OS grid reference: SO845835
- District: South Staffordshire
- Shire county: Staffordshire
- Region: West Midlands
- Country: England
- Sovereign state: United Kingdom
- Post town: Stourbridge
- Postcode district: DY7
- Dialling code: 01384
- Police: Staffordshire
- Fire: Staffordshire
- Ambulance: West Midlands
- UK Parliament: South Staffordshire

Kinver is a large village in the District of South Staffordshire in Staffordshire, England. It is in the far south-west of the county, at the end of the narrow finger of land surrounded by the counties of Shropshire, Worcestershire and the West Midlands. The nearest towns are Stourbridge, West Midlands, Kidderminster in Worcestershire and Bridgnorth, Shropshire. The Staffordshire and Worcestershire Canal passes through, running close to the course of the meandering River Stour. According to the 2011 census Kinver ward had a population of 7,225.

== The village today ==
The village has three schools: Foley Infant Academy, Brindley Heath Academy and Kinver High School, now part of the Invictus Multi Academy Trust.

Kinver Edge, which incorporates the former Kingsford Country Park in Worcestershire, comprises approximately 600 acres of land owned by the National Trust and open to the public. The Staffordshire and Worcestershire Canal which runs through the parish is popular with boaters, particularly in the summer months.

The village has a number of events throughout the year, including open gardens, beer festivals at various venues and concerts at the Community Centre and St. Peter's Church.

== The parish ==
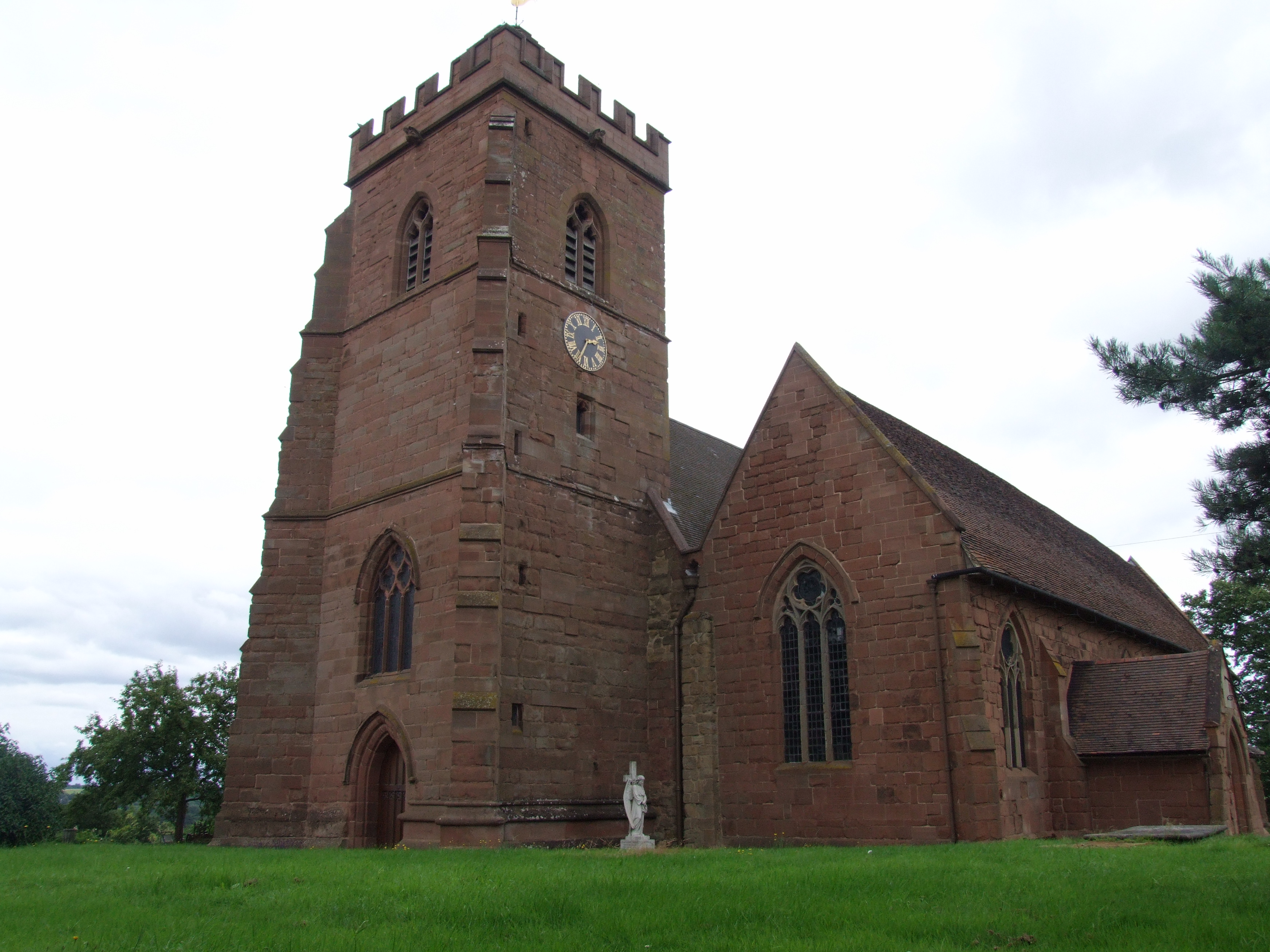
St. Peters Church, Kinver

St. Peter's Church, the village and parish church sits in a prominent position on a hill just south of the village.

Several hamlets lie in the parish of Kinver, including Dunsley, Compton, Stourton and Whittington. The neighbouring village of Enville is in its own parish.

== Transport ==
Kinver is served by the 242 service from Kinver to Stourbridge and 580 TUES/THU/FRI twice a day to Kidderminster

Route	Destination	Operator	Notes
242	Stourbridge	Diamond Bus	Monday to Saturday; plus school service 242S on schooldays
580	Kidderminster	Diamond Bus	Tuesday/Thursday/Friday only

== History ==
Kinver has, at various times in the past, been spelt on maps and documents as: Kinfare, Kynfare, Chenfare, Chenevare, Chenefare (as listed in the Domesday Book) and Cynefare. The earliest form of the name is Cynibre, in a charter of 736 AD. The first element may be assimilated to cyne 'royal', but may come from a Celtic root cuno- 'dog'. The second element -bre refers to a steep hill, probably Kinver Edge. The ancient Hill Fort atop the Edge is of possible Bronze-age and certainly Iron Age origin. A Roman presence at nearby Greensforge Fort dates from around 47 AD.

The hilltop church is on a very ancient site, and the current church, dedicated to St. Peter dates from the 12th century. The village High Street was laid out as the burgages of a new town by the lord of the manor in the late 13th century and was administered by a borough court, separate for the manorial court for the rest of the manor of Kinver and Stourton (known as Kinfare Foreign).

The main pub, The White Hart, dates from the 14th century, and the Anchor Hotel (now developed as housing) from the 15th century. The grammar school opened in 1511, the first teacher being a priest paid by local men, and functioned as a school until closure in 1916. School accounts from the 1700s are held at the University of Birmingham.

Kinver was known for making sturdy woollen cloth, using the flow of the Stour for fulling mills and dyeing. The village also profited from being a stop on the great "Irish Road" from Bristol to Chester (until the 19th century, the port of embarkation for Ireland), the 'White Hart' being the oldest and largest inn.

There was a brief cavalry melee on the Heath during the English Civil War between "Tinker Fox" the local Parliamentary commander and local Royalist forces. Fox retired to Stourton Castle which was briefly invested by the Royalists. During his flight from the Battle of Worcester King Charles II made his way over Whittington Heath into nearby Stourbridge.

Later, the river was used to power finery forges and from 1628 slitting mills, including Hyde Mill which has been claimed (incorrectly) as the earliest in England, though it certainly was among the earliest. There were five slitting mills in the parish by the late 18th century, more than any other parish in Great Britain. These slit bars of iron into rods to be made into nails in the nearby Black Country.

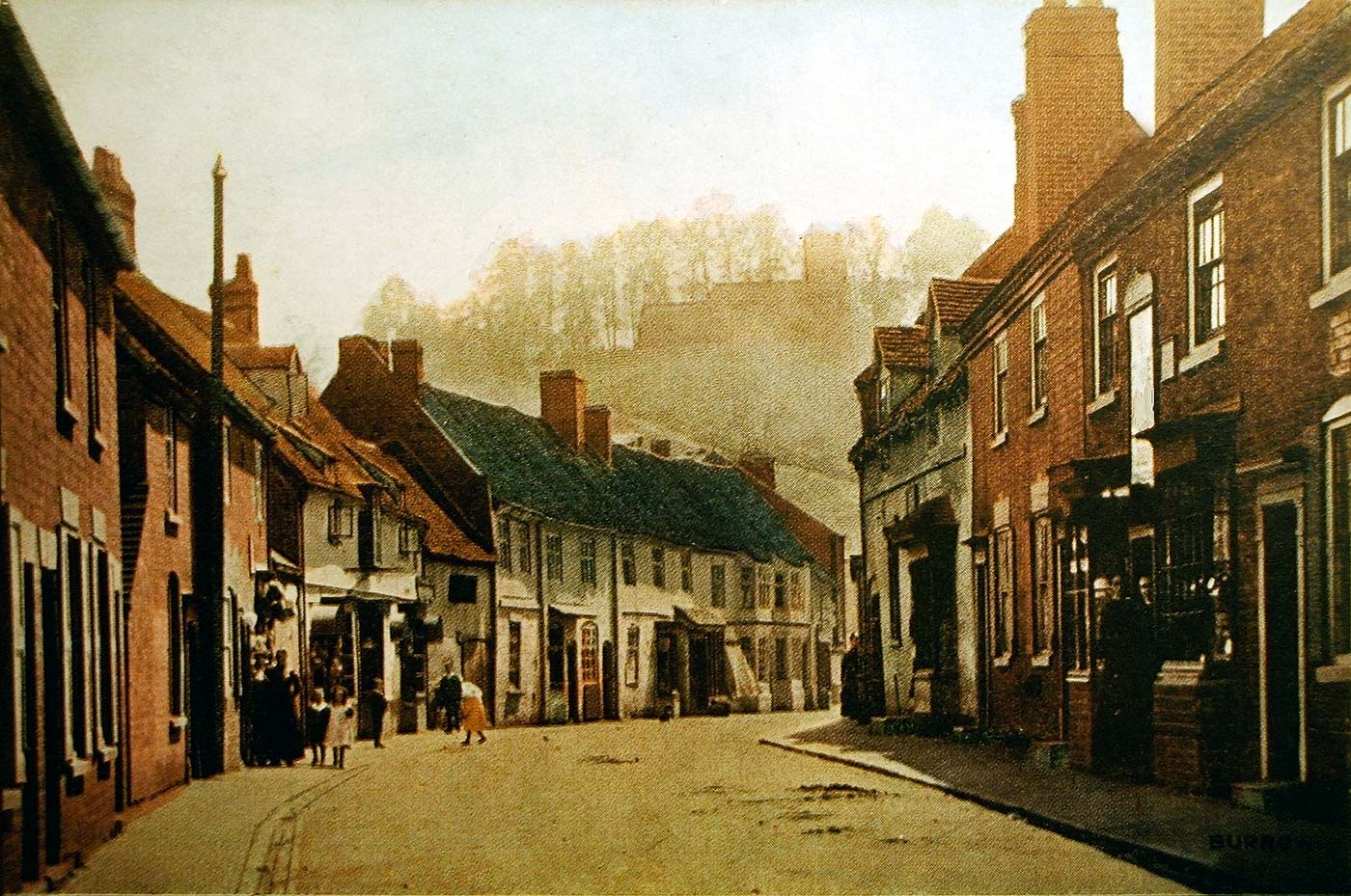
Kinver High Street, and St Peter's on Church Hill behind. Circa 1910.

Stourton Castle figured notably in the history of the English Civil Wars. It was the birthplace of cardinal Reginald Pole, last catholic archbishop of Canterbury, who came within a whisker of the papacy.

In 1771 the area was opened up to trade by the Staffordshire and Worcestershire Canal, built by James Brindley.

In Victorian and Edwardian times Kinver was a popular Sunday day out for people from Birmingham and the Black Country, via a 1901 pole & wires tram extension that ran across the fields, the "Kinver Light Railway".

The nailshops and forges ceased work around 1892, and local ironworks are thought to have all closed in about 1912 or 1913.

== Myths ==
According to local eyewitness accounts, a panther may roam the woods and fields of Kinver. It is believed this so-called 'Beast of Kinver' was once kept as a pet but was released into the wild when new laws restricting the keeping of wild animals were introduced in the 1960s. A former policeman who saw the creature described it as resembling a European Lynx.

The larger Witch's Tree at the base of the Edge is also renowned for various visions and sightings. This was believed to be the central location for the witch trials in the area and several women were believed to be hanged for witchcraft and heresy.

Other myths and legends include the sightings of many ghosts and spirits, especially around the area of the Scout camp which is situated between the Edge and St Peter's Church. Ghosts here include the mysterious Lottie who was kidnapped from the nearby village in the mid-1850s but escaped her captors only to be chased over the Edge before her footprints mysteriously disappeared from the snowy track.

Other famous hauntings include the spirit of Lady Jane Grey, (who, for nine days, was intruded as Queen of England immediately prior to Queen Mary Tudor) whose ghost has been reported at the Whittington Inn, and the infamous William Howe, a footpad who murdered Benjamin Robins of Dunsley Hall and became the penultimate person to be gibbeted at nearby Gibbet Lane in the early 19th century.

A famous story goes that Richard Foley (known as "Fiddler Foley") had carried out industrial espionage in Sweden by posing as a wandering musician. By this stratagem he was said to have gained the knowledge necessary to instal his slitting mill at Hyde. The former iron foundry there was one of the places where Dud Dudley attempted his revolutionary innovations, and it has been shown that he was an ancestor of Abraham Darby who later perfected the smelting of iron with coal (research by Carl Higgs).

There is a long-standing tradition that Wulfhere King of Mercia (succeeded 657) dedicated the parish church of St Peter in memory of his sons, Wulphad and Ruffius, who he had killed in anger when they converted to Christianity (Seisdon Council Guide, 1966).

== Dick Whittington ==
According to local claims, the Whittington Inn was formerly Whittington manor house, built in 1310 by Sir William de Whittington, a knight at arms and grandfather of Richard Whittington, upon whose life the pantomime character Dick Whittington is based.

These claims are in fact unfounded: Dick Whittington (q.v.) came from Gloucestershire. The Whittington Inn was merely a farmhouse belonging to a freeholder of the manor of Whittington. The 18th century manor house was undoubtedly Whittington Hall (now Whittington Hall Farm). This belonged to the lords of the manor, and probably had done so since the mediaeval period.

== Kinver Light Railway ==
Kinver Light Railway, an electric light tramway opened on 4 April 1901 and helped establish the local tourism industry. However, as buses became more popular during the 1920s, it was eventually closed on 8 February 1930.

Transport today is provided by Select Bus service 242 from Stourbridge to Kinver which departs Stourbridge at xx40 Mon-Sat daytime. (There are no journeys at 1540 from Stourbridge or at 1510 and 1610 from Kinver due to the bus being used on a school route.) Diamond Bus 580 operates one journey each way to Kidderminster on Tuesday, Thursday and Friday only. The 580 service number dates back to when Kinver was connected to Wolverhampton as part of the South Staffordshire bus routes at one time numbered 580-589 and which served a number of rural communities in South Staffordshire. These connections were withdrawn in 2017 as part of cuts in funding a number of bus services in the county of Staffordshire. Service 242 was previously operated by The Green Bus Company but due to a shortage of drivers, was awarded to Select Bus in September 2021 as an emergency replacement. From 1st September 2024, the 242 will be operated by Diamond Bus.

== Kinver Edge rock houses ==
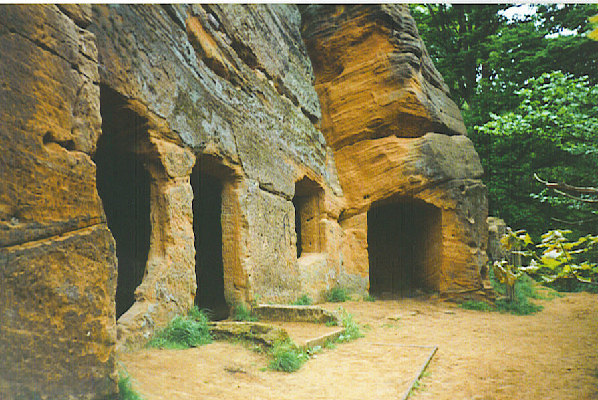
Rock Houses, Kinver Edge

The National Trust-owned beauty spot of Kinver Edge lies to the south-west of the village at 52.44985°N 2.24205°W. There are notable rock or cave houses on Kinver Edge, carved from the sandstone, some inhabited as late as the 1960s. Some of the rock houses have been restored to their former inhabited states.

Such rock houses were the setting of a book and silent film, Bladys of the Stewponey (1919, Sabine Baring-Gould), but most of this has since been lost. The "Stewponey" refers to an ancient inn (now demolished and replaced by flats) at Stourton in Kinver parish.

== Notable people ==
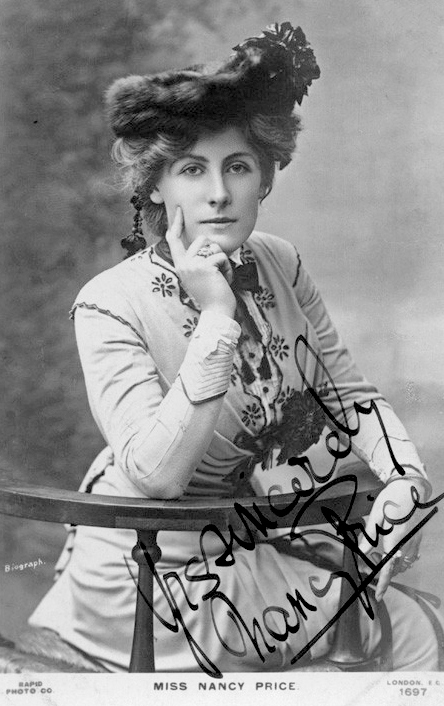
Nancy Price, 1900s

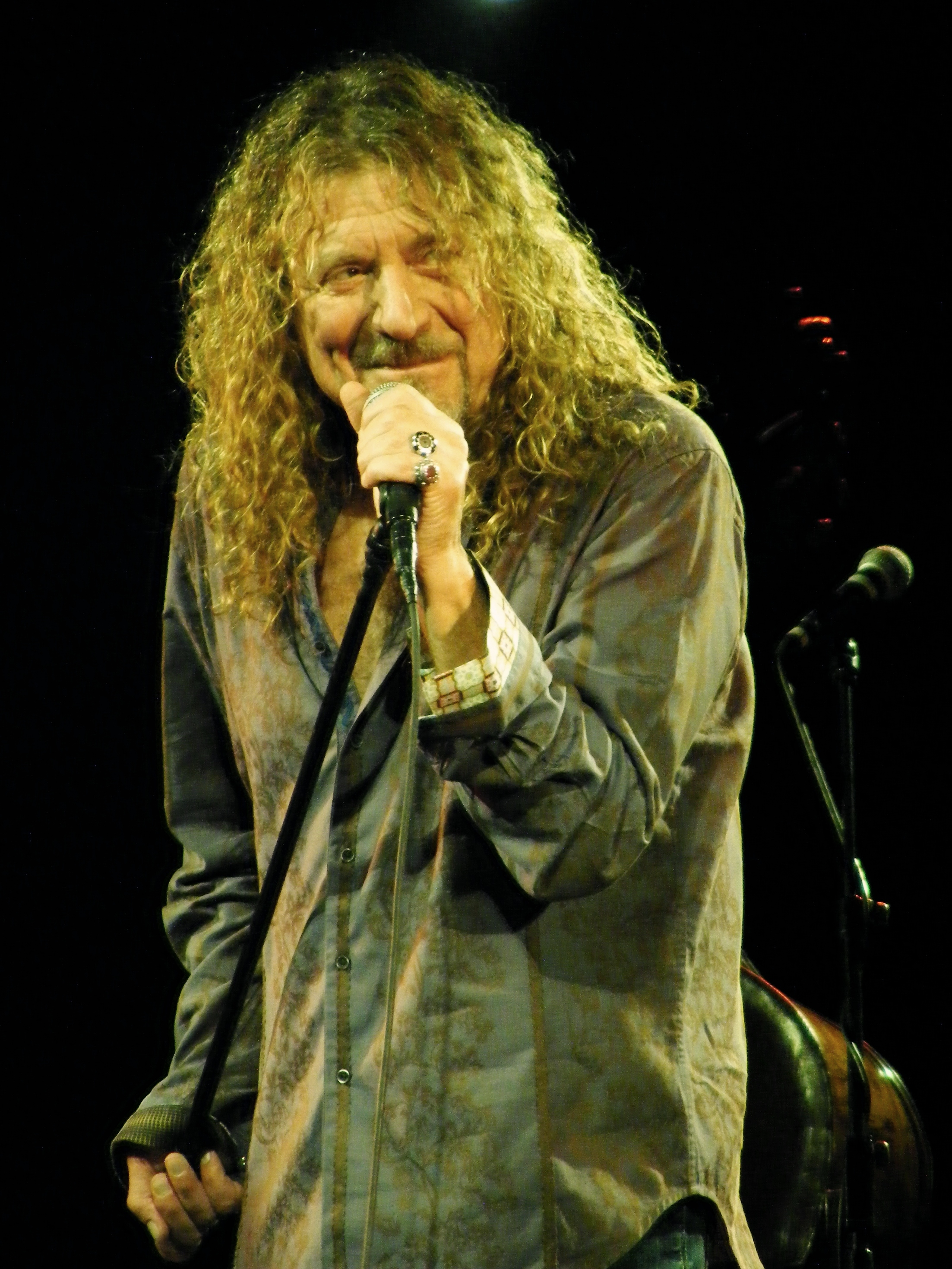
Robert Plant, 2010

- John Newey (1664–1735) born and educated in Kinver, later Dean of Chichester (1728–1735)
- John Hodgetts-Foley (1797 Prestwood House, Kinver – 1861) a British MP.
- Thomas Bolton (microscopist) (1831 in Kinver – 1887), owner-manager of Hyde Iron Works, zoologist and microscopist
- Jack Lotto (1857 in Kinver – 1944) a music hall performer and trick-cyclist.
- Joe Morley (1867 in Kinver – 1937 in London) a British classical banjoist
- Nancy Price CBE (1880 in Kinver – 1970) an English actress on stage and screen, author and theatre director
- Kenneth Harper (1913 in Kinver – 1998) an English film producer of 13 films 1954–1973
- Nick Owen MBE (born 1947) an English TV presenter and newsreader, presents BBC Midlands Today; Chairman of Luton Town Football Club 2008–2017, lives in the village
- Robert Plant CBE (born 1948) an English singer, songwriter, and musician, the lead singer and lyricist of the rock band Led Zeppelin, lives in Shatterford, a regular visitor to the village
- Louis Barnett (born 1991 in Kinver) a licensed chocolatier who became the youngest supplier of both the Sainsbury's and Waitrose supermarket chains at the age of 14
- The Arcadian Kicks an indie rock band from Kinver who formed in 2006

=== Sport ===
- Dorothy Round (1908–1982) a British tennis player, won Wimbledon singles, 1934 and 1937
- Jock Mulraney (1916–2001 in Kinver) a Scottish professional footballer
- Roy Swinbourne (1929–2015) an English footballer who played centre forward for Wolverhampton Wanderers F.C., lived in Kinver
- Tony Marsh (1931–2009) a British racing driver and six-times RAC Hill climb champion lived in the village
- Alan Duff (1938 in Kinver – 1989) an English first-class cricketer who played 1950s-1960s

== Drakelow tunnels / Drakelow RGHQ ==
Just outside Kinver are Drakelow Tunnels. The tunnels were used for various purposes by the MoD for many years.

The tunnels were originally built as a Second World War shadow factory for the Rover car company and were used to manufacture aircraft engine components for the company's main supply factory in Birmingham and its shadow factories at Acocks Green and Solihull. They were also intended to act as a backup facility if either of the main shadow factories was damaged by enemy action. Part of the underground facility was also used as an RAF stores area.

During the Cold War the tunnels were turned into a Regional Government Headquarters (RGHQ). In the event of Nuclear War Government officials, VIPs and heads of the regional military and emergency services would be housed here safely away from falling bombs and the effects of radiation and nuclear fallout. After the Cold War ended, the Drakelow site was decommissioned and sold in around 1993.

Planning permission was granted in January 2021 for the tunnels to be developed into a wine warehouse and distribution centre, with around 19,000 sq ft (1,800 m^{2}) of the tunnels being renovated to museum standard.

== Kinver Brewery ==
Kinver Brewery was established in 2004. The brewery won the Champion Beer of Britain Gold Medal at the National Winter Ales Festival 2014 for "Over the Edge" in the Barley Wine and Strong Old Ale category.

== Village twinning ==
Kinver is twinned with:

Mer, France	Park Ridge, Illinois, United States

== See also ==
- Listed buildings in Kinver
