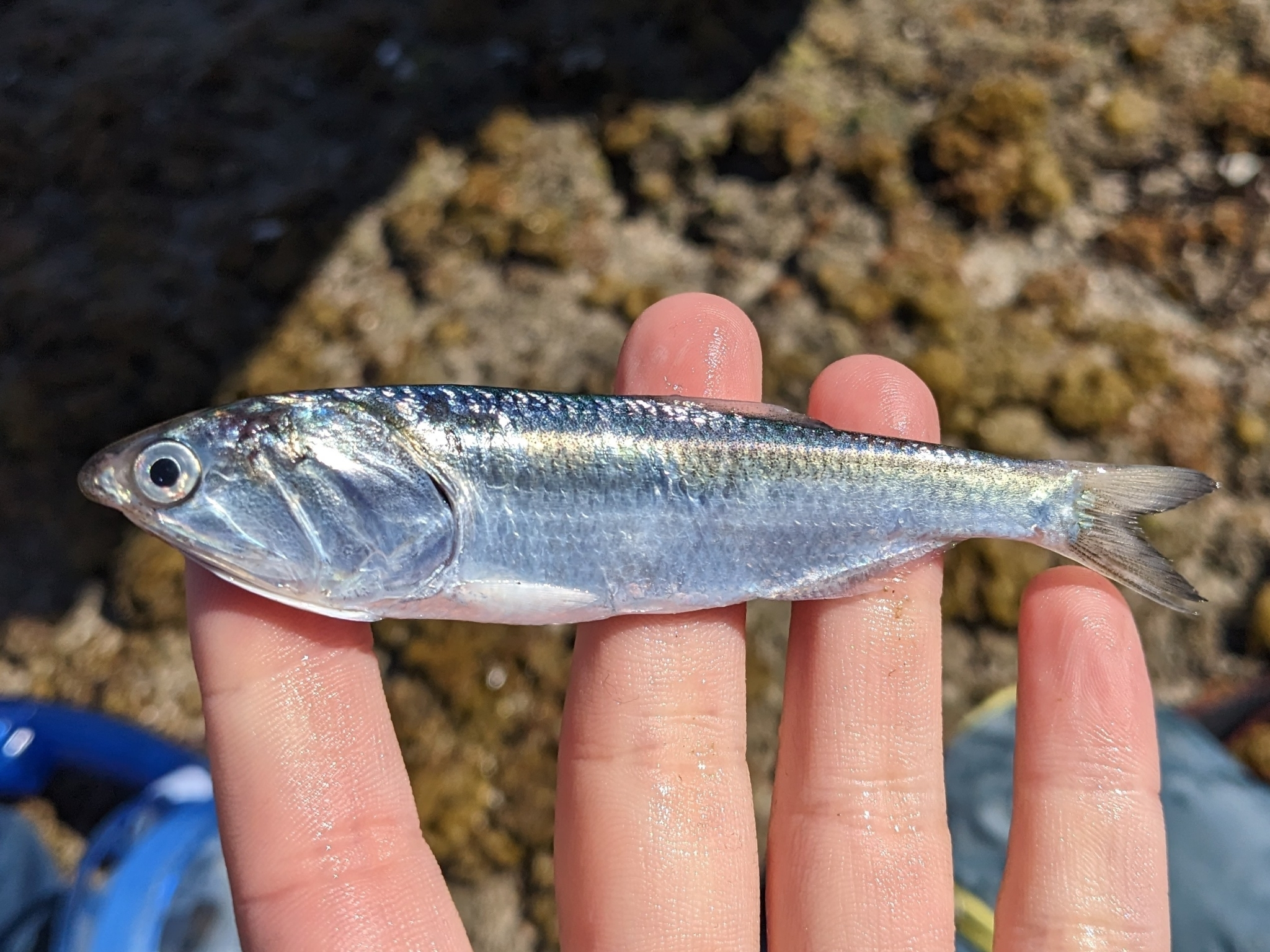

Conservation status
- Least Concern (IUCN 3.1)

Scientific classification
- Kingdom: Animalia
- Phylum: Chordata
- Class: Actinopterygii
- Order: Clupeiformes
- Family: Engraulidae
- Genus: Cetengraulis
- Species: C. mysticetus

Binomial name
- Cetengraulis mysticetus (Günther, 1867)

Synonyms
- Anchovia opercularis (Jordan & Gilbert, 1882); Cetengraulis engymen Gilbert & Pierson, 1898; Engraulis mysticetus Günther, 1867; Stolephorus opercularis D. S. Jordan & Gilbert, 1882

= Cetengraulis mysticetus =

Species of ray-finned fish

Cetengraulis mysticetus is a species of anchovy of the family Engraulidae. Its common names include Pacific anchoveta.
