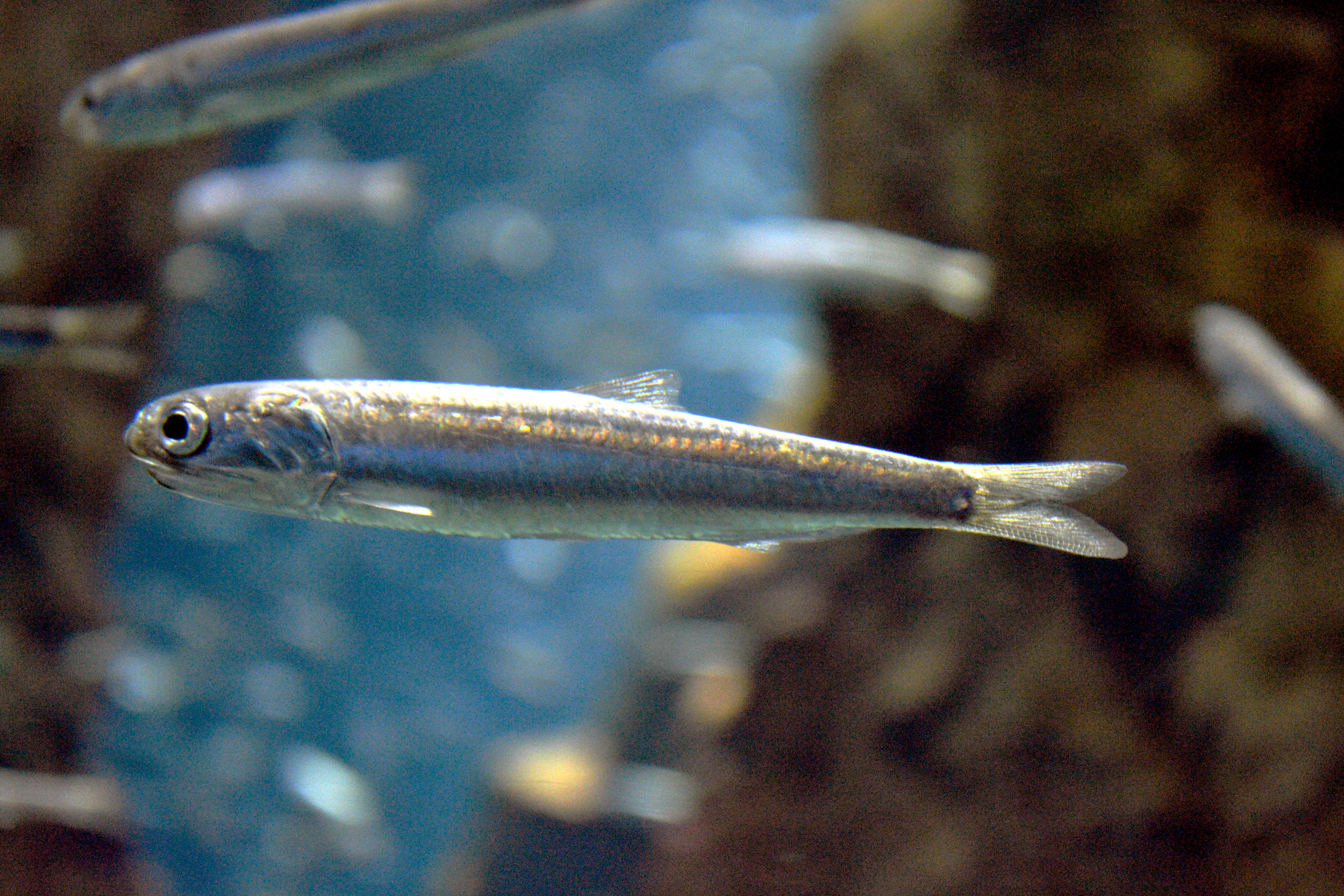

Scientific classification
- Kingdom: Animalia
- Phylum: Chordata
- Class: Actinopterygii
- Order: Clupeiformes
- Family: Engraulidae
- Genus: Engraulis
- Species: E. japonicus

Binomial name
- Engraulis japonicus Temminck & Schlegel, 1846

Synonyms
- Argentina japonica Forster, 1795; Atherina japonica Houttuyn, 1782; Engraulis japonica Temminck & Schlegel, 1846; Engraulus japonicus Temminck & Schlegel, 1846; Stolephorus celebicus Hardenberg, 1933

= Japanese anchovy =

Species of fish

Global capture production of Japanese anchovy (Engraulis japonicus) in million tonnes from 1950 to 2022, as reported by the FAO

The Japanese anchovy (Engraulis japonicus) is a schooling fish in the family Engraulidae. It is common in the northwest Pacific Ocean, occurring in the Sea of Okhotsk, the Sea of Japan, the east coast of Japan, the Yellow Sea, and East China Sea. This species lives for 2–3 years, similar to the European anchovy.

At maturity the Japanese anchovy has a length of 10 to 18 centimetres (3.9 to 7.1 in) with a common length of 14 centimetres (5.5 in). They can reach a maximum weight of 45 grams (1.6 oz).

In South Jeolla Province, South Korea, this species is fished using a traditional fixed shore net fishing method called nangjangmang (long bag set net). It is fished elsewhere in South Korea too, as well as in China and Japan.

== Gallery ==
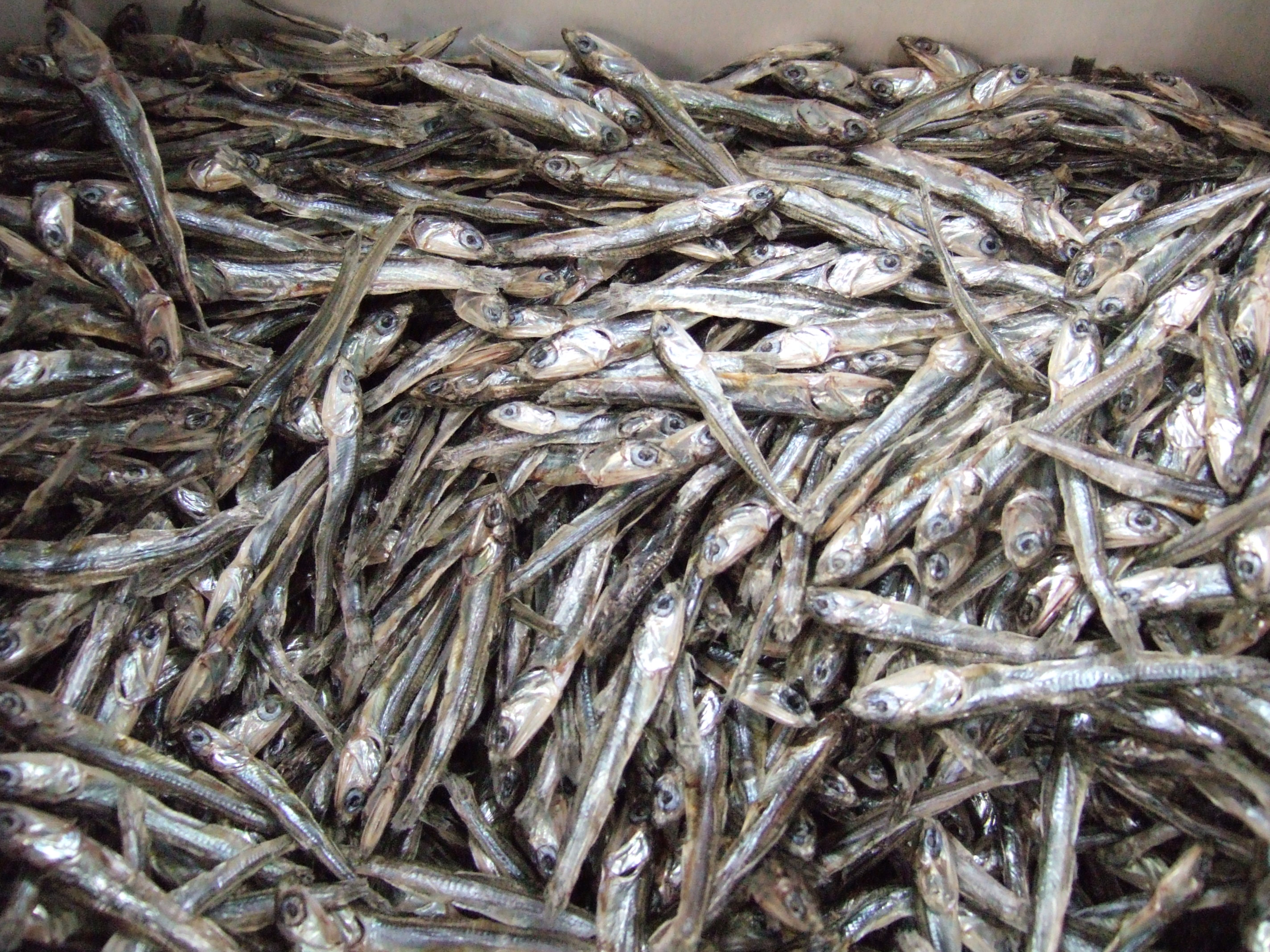
Dried Japanese anchovy (Engraulis japonica) at the market

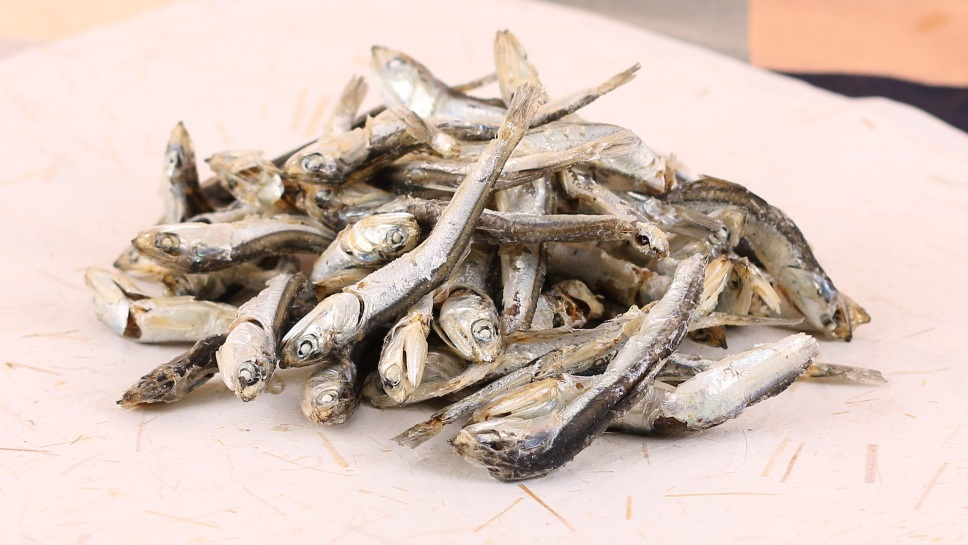
Dried dae-myeolchi (large anchovies)

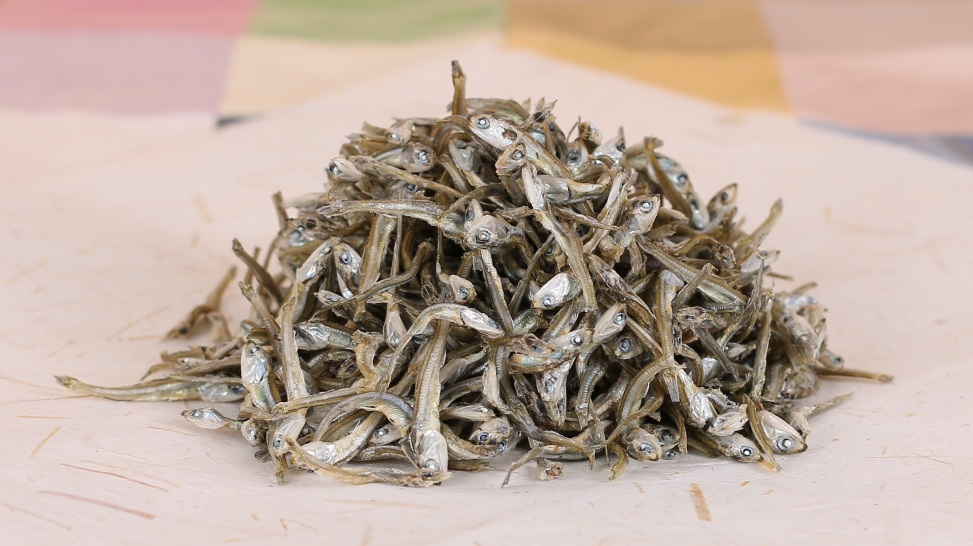
Dried jung-myeolchi (medium anchovies)

== Sources ==
- Engraulis japonicus at FishBase
