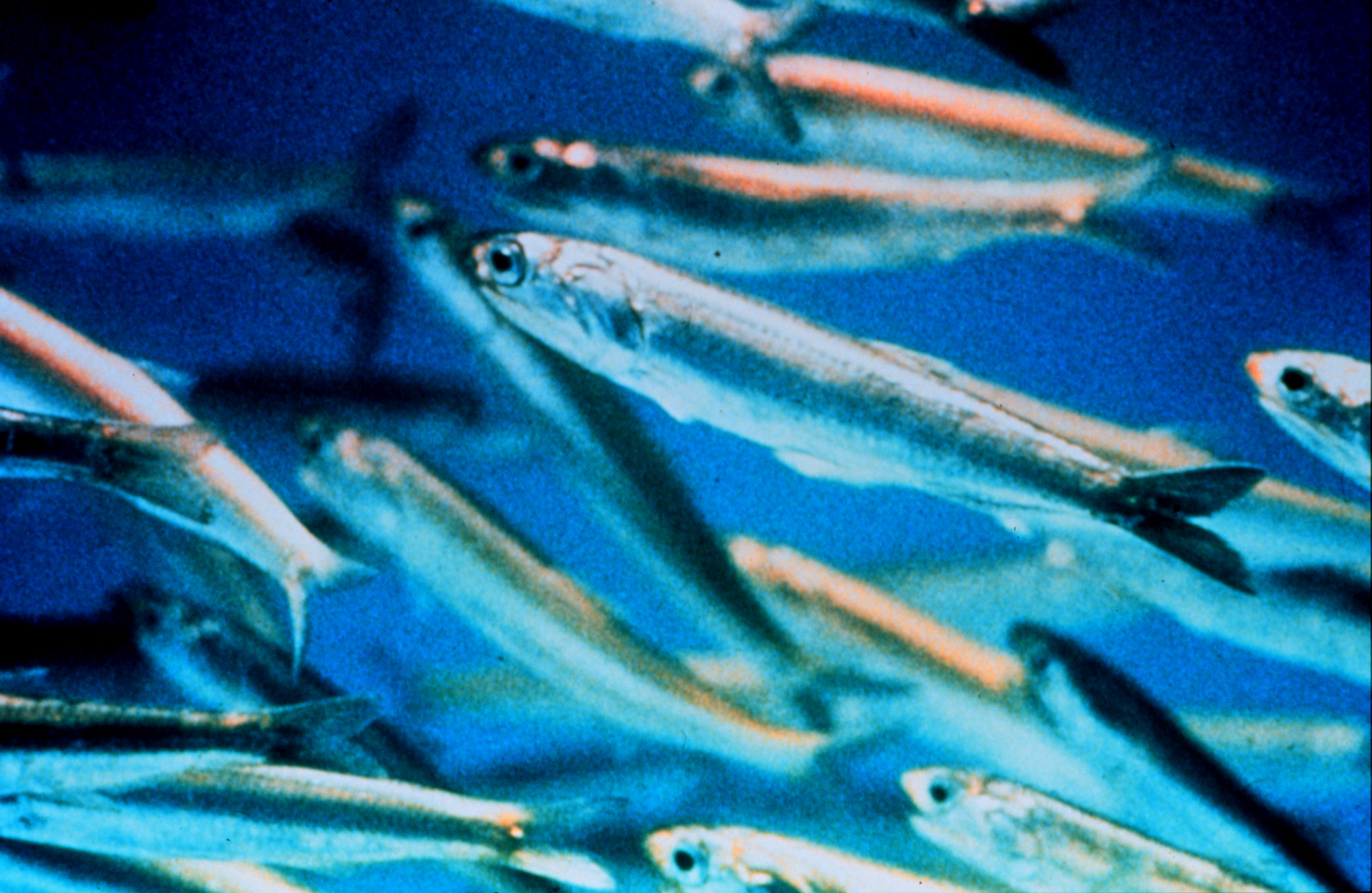

Conservation status
- Data Deficient (IUCN 3.1)

Scientific classification
- Kingdom: Animalia
- Phylum: Chordata
- Class: Actinopterygii
- Division: Teleostei
- Order: Clupeiformes
- Family: Engraulidae
- Genus: Engraulis
- Species: E. mordax

Binomial name
- Engraulis mordax Girard, 1854
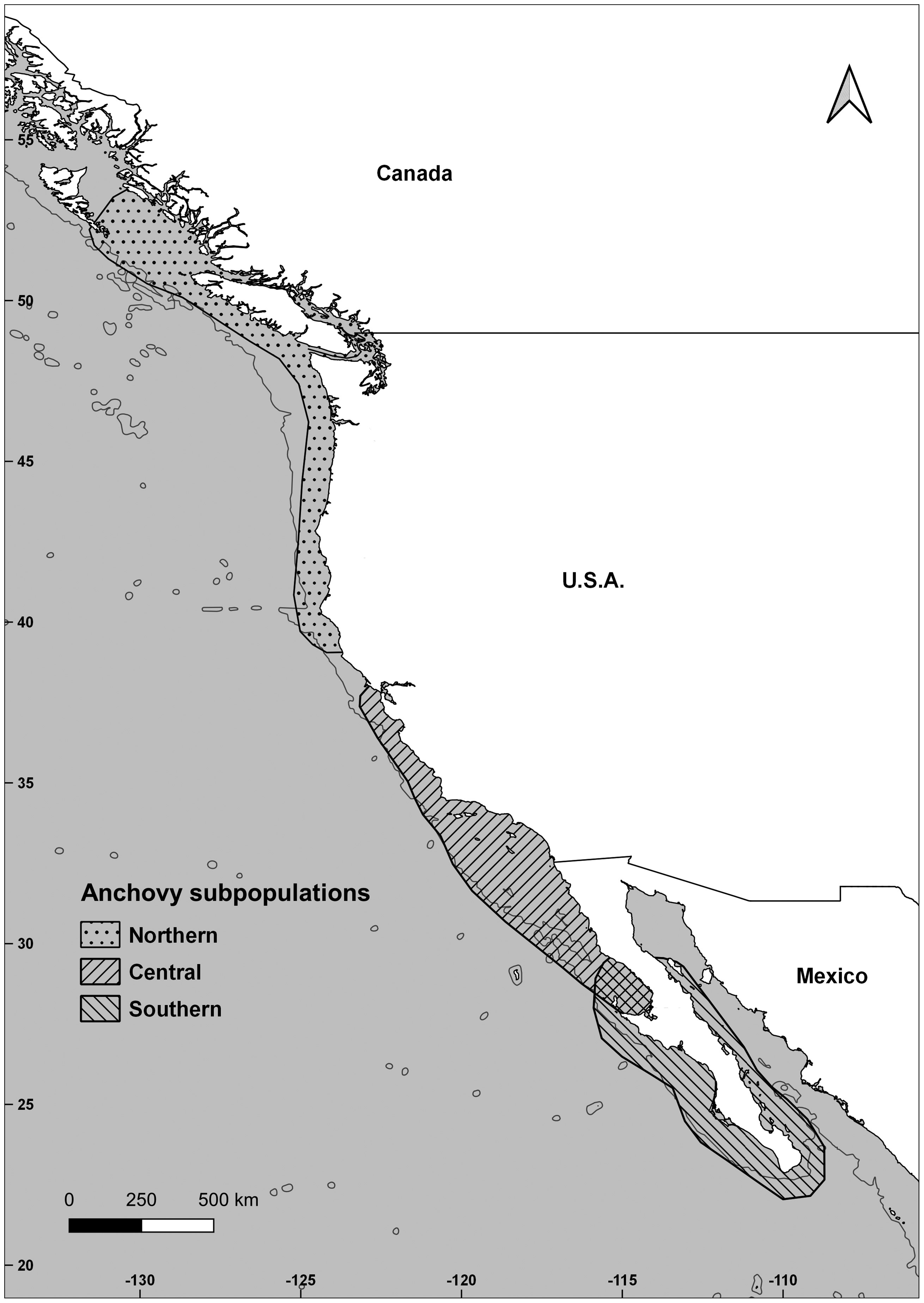
- Distribution map of three Californian (northern) anchovy subpopulations.

Synonyms
- Anchovia maui (Fowler & Bean, 1923); Anchoviella mauii Fowler & Bean, 1923; Engraulis mordax mordax Girard, 1854; Engraulis nanus Girard, 1858; Engraulus mordax Girard, 1854

= Californian anchovy =

Species of fish

The Californian anchovy or northern anchovy (Engraulis mordax) is a species of anchovy found in the Eastern Pacific Ocean, ranging from Mexico to British Columbia. It is a small, Clupeoid fish with a large mouth and a long, laterally compressed body, which strongly resembles the European Anchovy (Engraulis encrasicolus) with only slight differences in girth and fin position. They have a euryhaline lifestyle defined by regular migrations between bays and open ocean for both spawning and foraging. Like Pacific sardines (Sardinops sagax), they compose a large fraction of the marine biomass in waters off the west coast of North America, where they are a vital keystone species in coastal pelagic waters. However, they are subject to seasonal boom & bust cycles that are chiefly caused by changes in water temperature and food availability; regularly switching places as the forage fish of prominence with the sardine during years defined by colder water temperatures, which makes them vulnerable to climate change. They have a small commercial fishery; mainly used as bait for fishermen or fish meal, with a dedicated small following as a food fish in San Francisco.

== Description ==
=== Morphology ===
Californian anchovies exhibit the basic anchovy body form like a large sub-terminal mouth that extends past the eye, a centrally located single dorsal fin on a compressed & elongated body, a forked caudal fin, the absence of a visible lateral line, and weak, shiny scales colored by crystalline guanine that complete its countershaded camouflage. The only way to confidently tell them apart from the European anchovy besides their range is to measure where the posterior side of their dorsal fins terminate on their body, which vertically matches exactly where the anal fin begins for Californian anchovies.

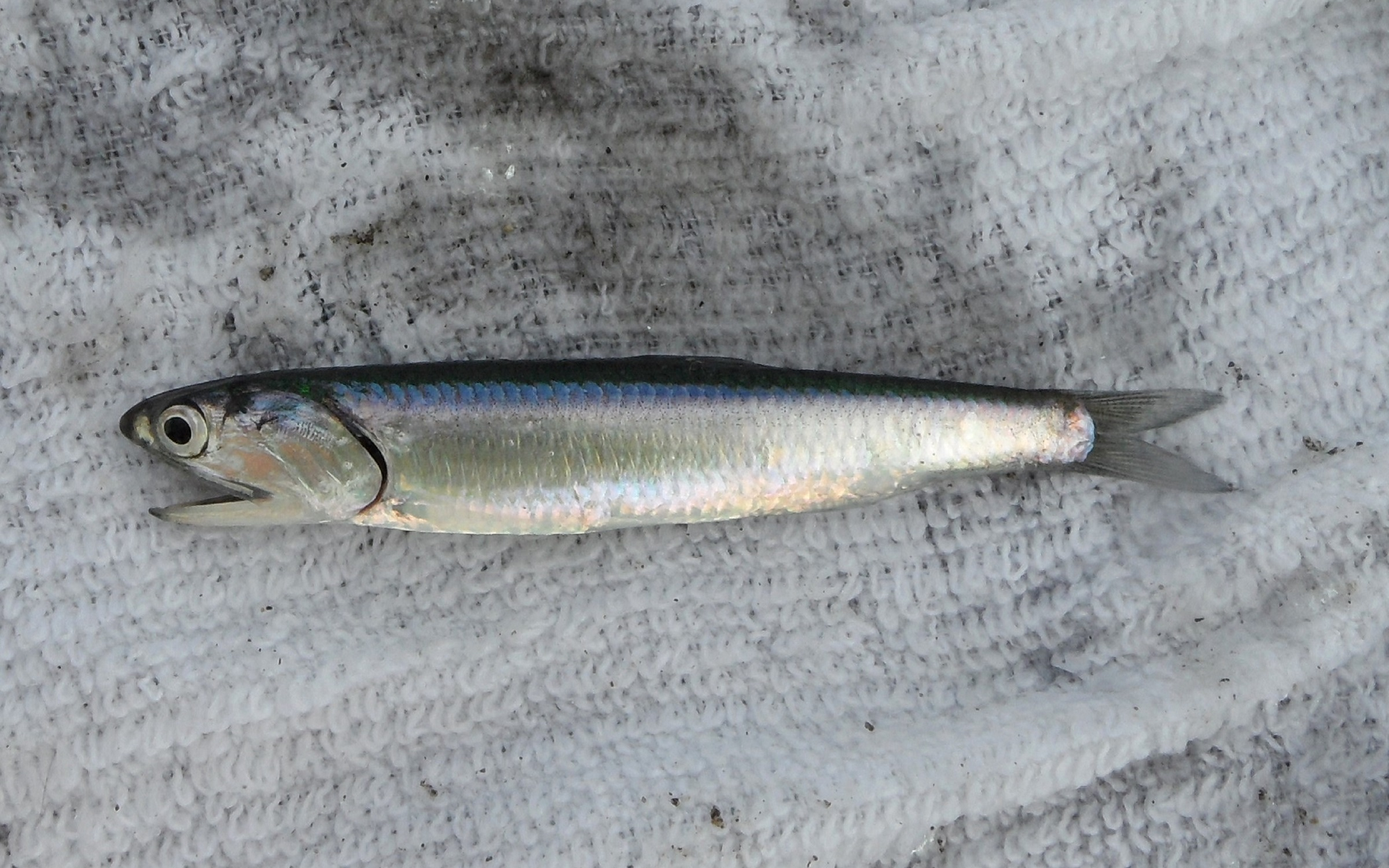
Profile view of a Californian anchovy

==== Purported "Bay" form ====
Trawling surveys in San Francisco Bay starting from the 1920s by famous ichthyologist Carl Leavitt Hubbs up to the present by scientists from UC Davis seem to support the existence of a separate "bay" form of the Californian anchovy that has fewer vertebrae than the oceanic "green-back" form, a proportionally larger head, a tan to transparent dorsum due to the near absence of guanine crystals in their chromatophores, and a residential lifestyle with no migration to coastal waters. Hubbs was confident enough about its existence that he described it as a subspecies named Engraulis mordax nanus Girard. However, all anchovies undergo regular shifts in dorsum color due to salinity changes during their migrations and transitions between their life stages, and that anchovies that closely resemble the "bay" form have been collected off the coast of Northern California. More research, preferably genetic analyses, on the "bay" form present in San Francisco Bay is needed to support its existence as a separate subspecies.

=== Distribution ===
The native range of the Californian anchovy is demarcated roughly between the nearshore waters off Haida Gwaii to the north and the Gulf of California to the south. Their range is divided into 3 phenotypically distinct sub-populations: a northern subpopulation between British Columbia and Monterey Bay, a central subpopulation between San Francisco Bay and coastal waters near El Rosario in central Baja California, and a southern subpopulation from Cedros Island southwards into the mouth of the Gulf of California. Although these subpopulations somewhat differ in certain characteristics like operculum width, body size, transferrin pattern types, and spawning times, they are not genetically distinct enough to warrant reclassification into separate subspecies.

=== Life cycle ===
Most California anchovies begin their lives hatching in coastal waters or in estuaries in late spring, though spawning is known to happen year-round. The larvae live in the photic zone of the waters near their birth as ichthyoplankton, where they float around at the mercy of tidal and oceanic currents and are thus regularly consumed by planktivores like pacific herring and other anchovies until the

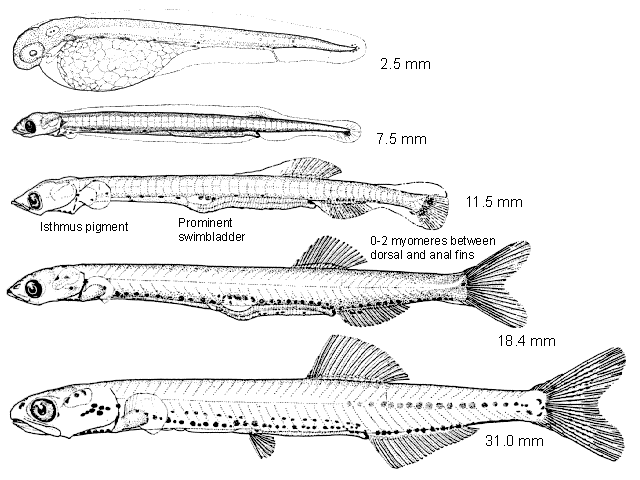
The larval stage of E. mordax

survivors mature into schooling sub-adults and begin moving into more saline waters, which physiologically corresponds with the increased guanine crystals (and therefore bluer & greener dorsum coloration) in their chromatophores; eventually making it into the open ocean where they become adults. Adult schools of anchovies regularly move between deeper and shallow waters to feed on plankton during their diel vertical migration until temperature and prey abundance cues certain cohorts of the population to either begin spawning in shallow inshore waters or inside large estuaries like the Salish Sea or San Francisco Bay. They typically have a lifespan between 4 and 7 years, with reproduction occurring yearly after maturing throughout their lives.

== Relationship with humans ==
=== Commercial fishing ===
As sardine populations declined in the Pacific during the 1940s and 50's, fish packers in America started canning the more abundant local anchovies. Total hauls increased over this time from 960 tons in 1946 to 9,464 tons in 1947 and peaking at almost 43,000 tons in 1953. From 1949 to 1955, they were restricted for all uses but bait fish in California. In 2010, reported American hauls totaled 2,100 metric tons. Most Californian anchovies today are fished for use in animal feed and as bait fish, with a small but dedicated community of gastronomic fans wherever they are sold fresh.

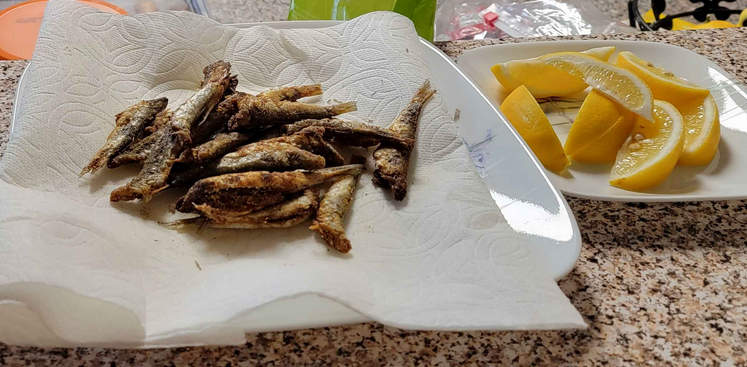
Boquerones fritos with recreationally caught E. mordax

=== Recreational fishing ===
They are taken by anglers for use as bait or for personal consumption.

=== Pollution ===
California anchovies in the Monterey Bay have been observed with heightened levels of microplastics, mistaking them for floating particulates of food. However, their low trophic level means that their rate of bioaccumulation is relatively low compared to higher trophic level fish like lingcod or striped bass, which makes them a safer bet for eating in large portions similar to salmon.

== Current status ==
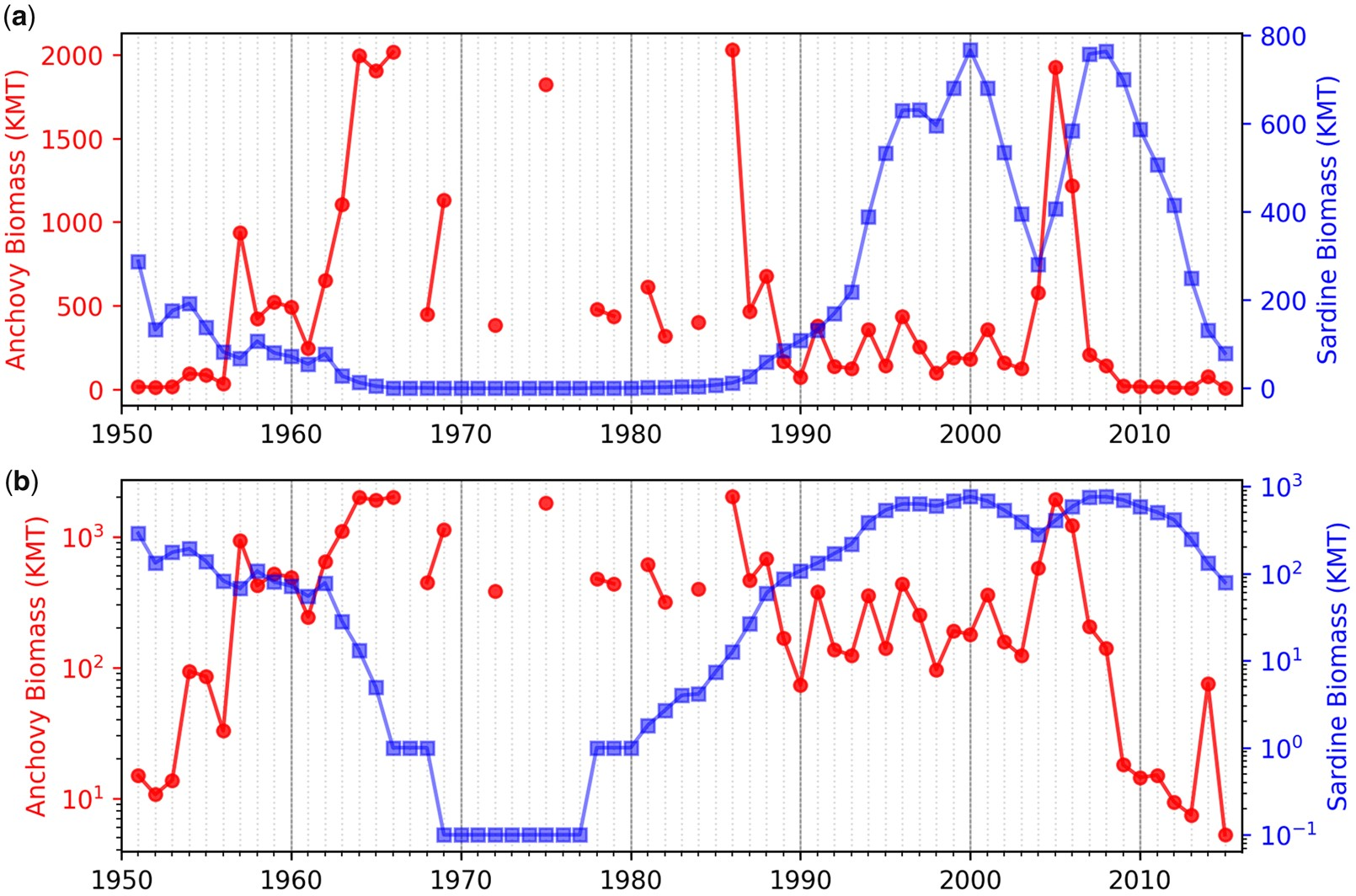
Biomass of the Central Subpopulation of California Anchovy and Pacific sardine off the California coast from 1951 to 2015 on (a) linear and (b) logarithmic scales.

The Californian anchovy is currently not a listed species even though its biomass has seen a decline during the 21st century. This is due to the natural oscillations in population size between anchovies and pacific sardines that are determined by water temperature, prey availability and rate of upwelling. The processes that drive these oscillations, or boom & bust cycles, are still largely unknown. Population stressors like overfishing or unusual oceanic conditions can have an outsized effect on a bust, which nearly drove pacific sardines to local extirpation. As climate change accelerates, the coastal upwelling that pelagic species in East Pacific waters rely on may weaken due to increasingly invariable winds, which can be detrimental to the spawning and rearing of forage fish. Californian anchovies are going to be heavily affected as their population biomass usually booms during cooler water years with high coastal productivity. Their boom & bust cycles will be stronger and occur more frequently than previously observed, which has already resulted in a measurable population bottleneck effect on their genetic diversity. If left unchecked, anchovy fisheries may experience a similar collapse to the sardines during the mid 20th century, which will put the countless species that rely on their continued abundance at serious risk.
