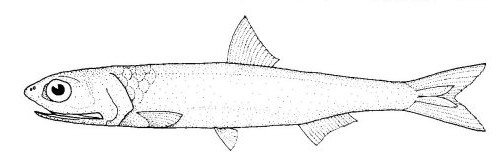
- Drawing by Dr Tony Ayling

Scientific classification
- Kingdom: Animalia
- Phylum: Chordata
- Class: Actinopterygii
- Order: Clupeiformes
- Family: Engraulidae
- Genus: Engraulis
- Species: E. australis

Binomial name
- Engraulis australis (J. White, 1790)

= Australian anchovy =

Species of fish

The Australian anchovy, Engraulis australis, is a species of anchovy of the family Engraulidae, found off south-east Australia, and around New Zealand.

The Australian anchovy feeds on plankton and is of minor importance to commercial fisheries. It is usually utilized as bait.
