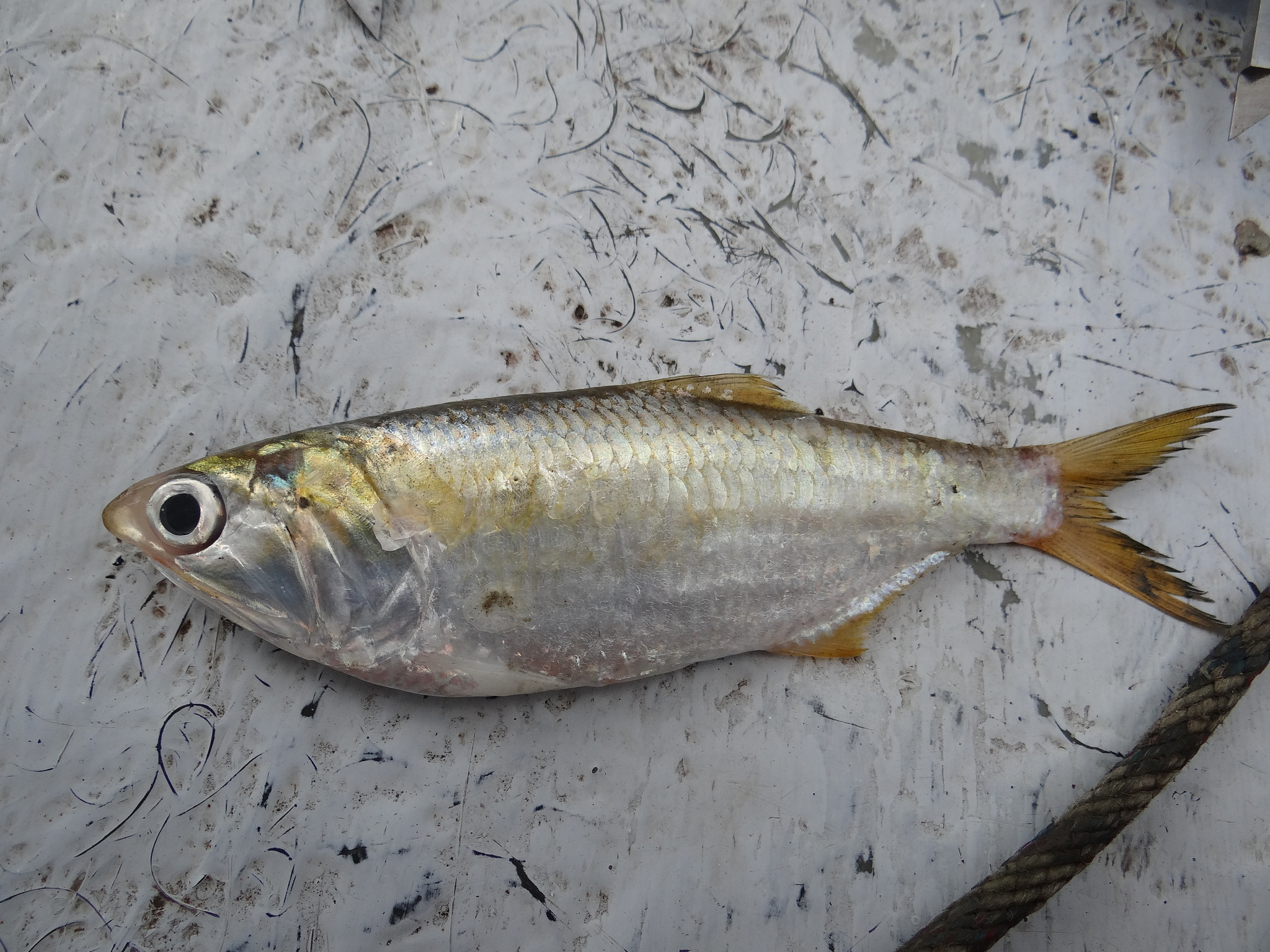

Conservation status
- Least Concern (IUCN 3.1)

Scientific classification
- Kingdom: Animalia
- Phylum: Chordata
- Class: Actinopterygii
- Order: Clupeiformes
- Family: Engraulidae
- Genus: Cetengraulis
- Species: C. edentulus

Binomial name
- Cetengraulis edentulus (Cuvier, 1829)

Synonyms
- Engraulis edentulus Cuvier, 1829

= Cetengraulis edentulus =

Atlantic anchoveta

Species of fish

Cetengraulis edentulus, the Atlantic anchoveta, is a species of ray-finned fish in the family Engraulidae. It is found in the western Atlantic Ocean.

== Size ==
This species reaches a length of 20.5 cm (8.1 in).
