= Anchovia clupeoides =

Zabaleta anchovy

Conservation status
- Least Concern (IUCN 3.1)

Scientific classification
- Kingdom: Animalia
- Phylum: Chordata
- Class: Actinopterygii
- Order: Clupeiformes
- Family: Engraulidae
- Genus: Anchovia
- Species: A. clupeoides

Binomial name
- Anchovia clupeoides (Swainson, 1839)

Synonyms
- Engraulis clupeoides Swainson, 1839; Stolephorus clupeoides (Swainson, 1839)

Species of fish

Anchovia clupeoides, the Zabaleta anchovy, is a species of ray-finned fish in the family Engraulidae. It is found in the western Atlantic Ocean.

== Size ==
This species reaches a length of 30.0 cm (11.8 in).
