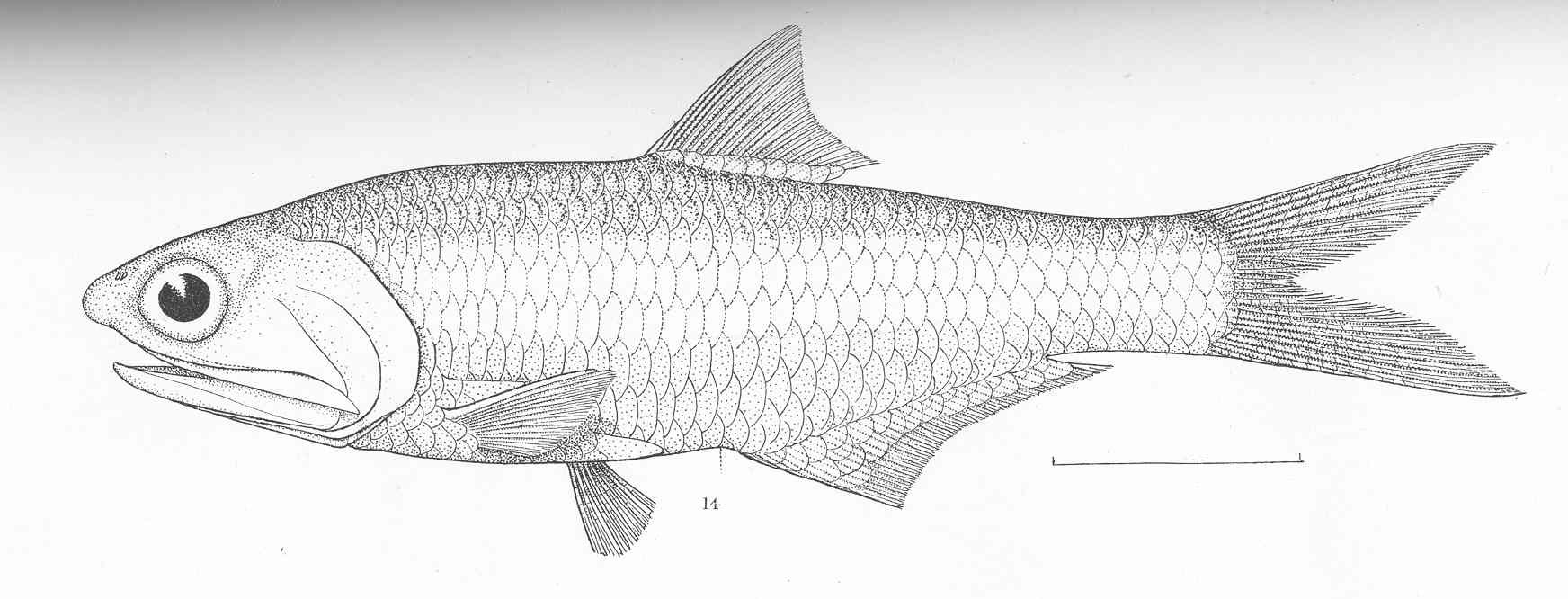

Conservation status
- Least Concern (IUCN 3.1)

Scientific classification
- Kingdom: Animalia
- Phylum: Chordata
- Class: Actinopterygii
- Order: Clupeiformes
- Family: Engraulidae
- Genus: Anchovia
- Species: A. macrolepidota

Binomial name
- Anchovia macrolepidota (Kner, 1863)

Synonyms
- Engraulis macrolepidotus Kner, 1863

= Anchovia macrolepidota =

Bigscale anchovy

Species of fish

Anchovia macrolepidota, the bigscale anchovy, is a species of ray-finned fish in the family Engraulidae. It is found in the eastern Pacific Ocean.

== Size ==
This species reaches a length of 25.0 cm (9.8 in).
