= Anchovia surinamensis =

Surinam anchovy

Conservation status
- Least Concern (IUCN 3.1)

Scientific classification
- Kingdom: Animalia
- Phylum: Chordata
- Class: Actinopterygii
- Order: Clupeiformes
- Family: Engraulidae
- Genus: Anchovia
- Species: A. surinamensis

Binomial name
- Anchovia surinamensis (Bleeker, 1865)

Synonyms
- Stolephorus surinamensis Bleeker, 1865; Anchoviella surinamensis (Bleeker, 1865); Odontognathus surinamensis (Bleeker, 1865); Engrantis surinamensis (Bleeker, 1865)

Species of fish

Anchovia surinamensis, the Surinam anchovy, is a species of ray-finned fish in the family Engraulidae. It is found in Central America and South America.

== Size ==
This species reaches a length of 15.0 cm (5.9 in).

== Etymology ==
The fish is named in honor of Francis Day (1829–1889), the Inspector-General of Fisheries in India.
