= Argentine anchoita =

Argentine anchovy

Conservation status
- Least Concern (IUCN 3.1)

Scientific classification
- Kingdom: Animalia
- Phylum: Chordata
- Class: Actinopterygii
- Division: Teleostei
- Order: Clupeiformes
- Family: Engraulidae
- Genus: Engraulis
- Species: E. anchoita

Binomial name
- Engraulis anchoita C. L. Hubbs & Marini, 1935

Species of fish

The Argentine anchoita (Engraulis anchoita) or Argentine anchovy is an anchovy of the genus Engraulis, found in and around waters of Argentina, Uruguay and southern Brazil.

== Description ==
It grows to 17 cm (6.7 in) SL or 22 cm (8.7 in) TL. Spawning takes place throughout the year but is most intense and close to shore in October/November, and more offshore and less intensely in May/June.

== Ecology ==
Engraulis anchoita is a key species in the pelagic ecosystem of the Argentine waters. They are zooplanktivores, and prey especially upon copepods, but also their own eggs. Engraulis anchoita themselves are prey to other species, and constitute a main diet component of important commercial species such as hake, squid and mackerel.

== Fishery ==
Annual catches of Engraulis anchoita in 2000–2009 varied between 12 and 44 thousand tonnes, mainly taken by Argentina.
