= Lycothrissa =

Conservation status
- Least Concern (IUCN 3.1)

Scientific classification
- Kingdom: Animalia
- Phylum: Chordata
- Class: Actinopterygii
- Order: Clupeiformes
- Family: Engraulidae
- Subfamily: Coiliinae
- Genus: Lycothrissa; Günther, 1868
- Species: L. crocodilus

Binomial name
- Lycothrissa crocodilus (Bleeker, 1851)

Synonyms
- Engraulis crocodilus Bleeker, 1850

Genus of ray-finned fishes

Lycothrissa is a monospecific genus of ray-finned fish belonging to the family Engraulidae, the anchovies. The only species in the genus is Lycothrissa crocodilus, the sabretooth thryssa, which is found in the lakes and estuaries in Sumatra. Kalimantan, Thailand and Cambodia.
