= Pterengraulis =

Conservation status
- Least Concern (IUCN 3.1)

Scientific classification
- Kingdom: Animalia
- Phylum: Chordata
- Class: Actinopterygii
- Order: Clupeiformes
- Family: Engraulidae
- Subfamily: Engraulinae
- Genus: Pterengraulis; Günther, 1868
- Species: P. atherinoides

Binomial name
- Pterengraulis atherinoides (Linnaeus, 1766)

Synonyms
- Clupea atherinoides Linnaeus, 1766; Engraulis atherinoides (Linnaeus, 1766)

Genus of ray-finned fishes

Pterengraulis atherinoides, the wingfin anchovy is a species of anchovy which is found along the Atlantic coast of South America from the Orinoco Delta to Ceará, Brazil. It is the only species in its genus.
