= Papuengraulis =

Conservation status
- Least Concern (IUCN 3.1)

Scientific classification
- Kingdom: Animalia
- Phylum: Chordata
- Class: Actinopterygii
- Order: Clupeiformes
- Family: Engraulidae
- Subfamily: Coiliinae
- Genus: Papuengraulis; Munro, 1964
- Species: P. micropinna

Binomial name
- Papuengraulis micropinna Munro, 1964

Genus of ray-finned fishes

Papuengraulis is a monospecific genus of ray-finned fish belonging to the family Engraulidae, the anchovies. The only species in the genus is Papuengraulis micropinna, the littlefin anchovy, bareback anchovy or little anchovy. This species is fround from the Gulf of Papua in Papua New Guinea and in Northern Territory, Australia from the Keep River estuary to the East Alligator River.
