= Rostral organ =

Rostral organ may refer to:

- An electroreceptive organ in coelacanths
- An electroreceptive organ in anchovies
- The melon, an organ found in cetaceans for echolocation
- A collective name for the rhinarium, vibrissae and mechanoreceptors found in the snout of therian mammals
