= Anchoviella =

Scientific classification
- Kingdom: Animalia
- Phylum: Chordata
- Class: Actinopterygii
- Order: Clupeiformes
- Family: Engraulidae
- Subfamily: Engraulinae
- Genus: Anchoviella; Fowler, 1911

Type species
- Engraulis perfasciatus Poey, 1860

Genus of ray-finned fishes

Anchoviella is a genus of anchovies, native to coastal parts of the tropical western Atlantic and eastern Pacific oceans, as well as rivers in South America.

== Species ==
There are currently 16 recognized species in this genus:

- Anchoviella alleni G. S. Myers, 1940 (Allen's anchovy)
- Anchoviella balboae D. S. Jordan & Seale, 1926 (Balboa anchovy)
- Anchoviella blackburni Hildebrand, 1943 (Blackburns's anchovy)
- Anchoviella brevirostris Günther, 1868 (Snubnose anchovy)
- Anchoviella carrikeri Fowler, 1940 (Carriker's anchovy)
- Anchoviella cayenensis Puyo, 1946 (Cayenne anchovy)
- Anchoviella elongata Meek & Hildebrand, 1923 (Elongate anchovy)
- Anchoviella guianensis C. H. Eigenmann, 1912 (Guyana anchovy)
- Anchoviella hernanni Loeb et al, 2018
- Anchoviella jamesi D. S. Jordan & Seale, 1926 (James's anchovy)
- Anchoviella juruasanga Loeb, 2012
- Anchoviella lepidentostole Fowler, 1911 (Broadband anchovy)
- Anchoviella manamensis Cervigón, 1982 (Manamo anchovy)
- Anchoviella perezi Cervigón, 1987
- Anchoviella perfasciata Poey, 1860 (Poey's anchovy)
- Anchoviella vaillanti Steindachner, 1908 (Vaillant's anchovy)
