= Jurengraulis =

Conservation status
- Least Concern (IUCN 3.1)

Scientific classification
- Kingdom: Animalia
- Phylum: Chordata
- Class: Actinopterygii
- Order: Clupeiformes
- Family: Engraulidae
- Subfamily: Engraulinae
- Genus: Jurengraulis; Whitehead, 1988
- Species: J. juruensis

Binomial name
- Jurengraulis juruensis (Boulenger, 1898)

Synonyms
- Cetengraulis juruensis Boulenger, 1898

Genus of ray-finned fishes

Jurengraulis juruensis, the Jurua anchovy, is a species of freshwater anchovy that is found in the Amazon River and its tributaries in Bolivia and Brazil. It is the only species in its genus.
