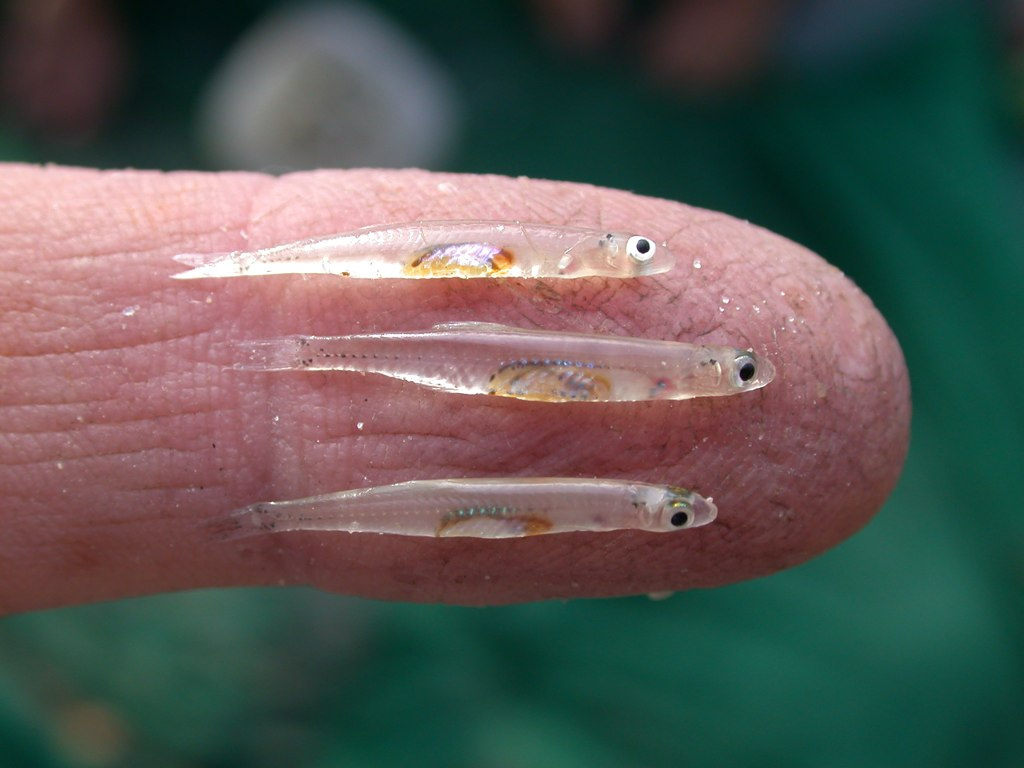

Conservation status
- Least Concern (IUCN 3.1)

Scientific classification
- Kingdom: Animalia
- Phylum: Chordata
- Class: Actinopterygii
- Order: Clupeiformes
- Family: Engraulidae
- Subfamily: Engraulinae
- Genus: Amazonsprattus; Roberts, 1984
- Species: A. scintilla

Binomial name
- Amazonsprattus scintilla Roberts, 1984

= Amazonsprattus =

Genus of ray-finned fishes

Amazonsprattus scintilla, the Rio Negro pygmy anchovy, is a fresh-water anchovy that is endemic to the Amazon River system in South America.
