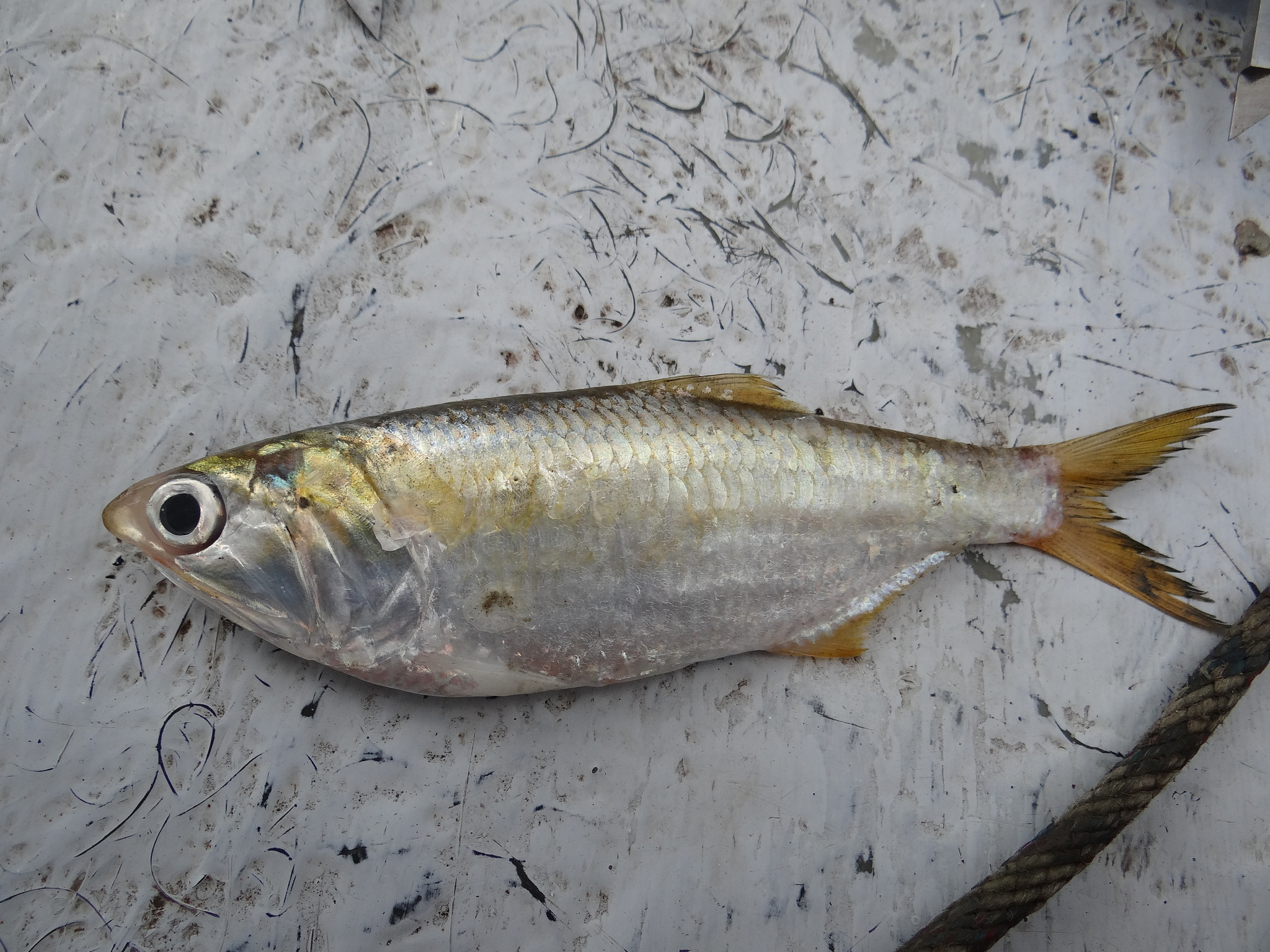

Scientific classification
- Kingdom: Animalia
- Phylum: Chordata
- Class: Actinopterygii
- Order: Clupeiformes
- Family: Engraulidae
- Subfamily: Engraulinae
- Genus: Cetengraulis; Günther, 1868

Type species
- Engraulis edentulus Cuvier, 1829

= Cetengraulis =

Genus of ray-finned fishes

Cetengraulis is a genus of anchovies. It currently contains two species.

== Species ==
- Cetengraulis edentulus (Cuvier, 1829) (Atlantic anchoveta)
- Cetengraulis mysticetus (Günther, 1867) (Pacific anchoveta)
