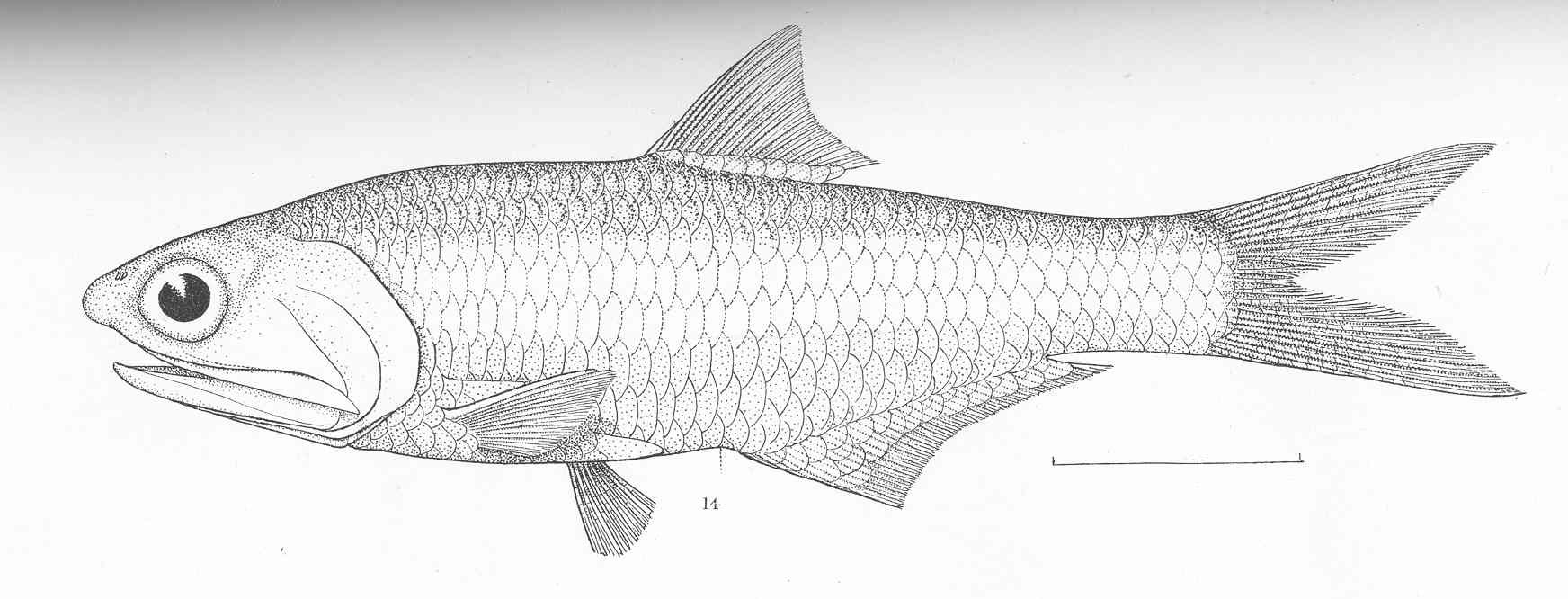
- Anchovia macrolepidota

Scientific classification
- Kingdom: Animalia
- Phylum: Chordata
- Class: Actinopterygii
- Order: Clupeiformes
- Family: Engraulidae
- Subfamily: Engraulinae
- Genus: Anchovia; D. S. Jordan & Evermann, 1895

Type species
- Engraulis macrolepidotus Kner, 1863

= Anchovia =

Genus of ray-finned fishes

Anchovia is a genus of anchovies. It currently contains 4 species. There are found in the eastern Pacific and western Atlantic ocean.

- Anchovia clupeoides (Swainson, 1839) (Zabaleta anchovy)
- Anchovia landivarensis Greenfield & Greenfield, 1975
- Anchovia macrolepidota (Kner, 1863) (Bigscale anchovy)
- Anchovia surinamensis (Bleeker, 1865) (Surinam anchovy)
