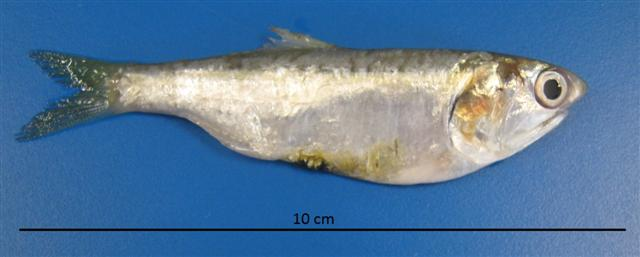
- Lycengraulis grossidens

Scientific classification
- Kingdom: Animalia
- Phylum: Chordata
- Class: Actinopterygii
- Order: Clupeiformes
- Family: Engraulidae
- Subfamily: Engraulinae
- Genus: Lycengraulis; Günther, 1868

Type species
- Engraulis grossidens Agassiz, 1829

= Lycengraulis =

Genus of ray-finned fishes

Lycengraulis is a genus of anchovies containing four recognized species. They are restricted to the Western Hemisphere in the waters in and around Central America and South America.

== Species ==
There are currently five recognized species in this genus:

- Lycengraulis batesii (Günther, 1868) (Bates' sabretooth anchovy)
- Lycengraulis figueiredoi Loeb & Alcântara, 2013
- Lycengraulis grossidens (Agassiz, 1829) (Atlantic sabretooth anchovy)
- Lycengraulis limnichthys L. P. Schultz, 1949
- Lycengraulis poeyi (Kner, 1863) (Pacific sabretooth anchovy)
