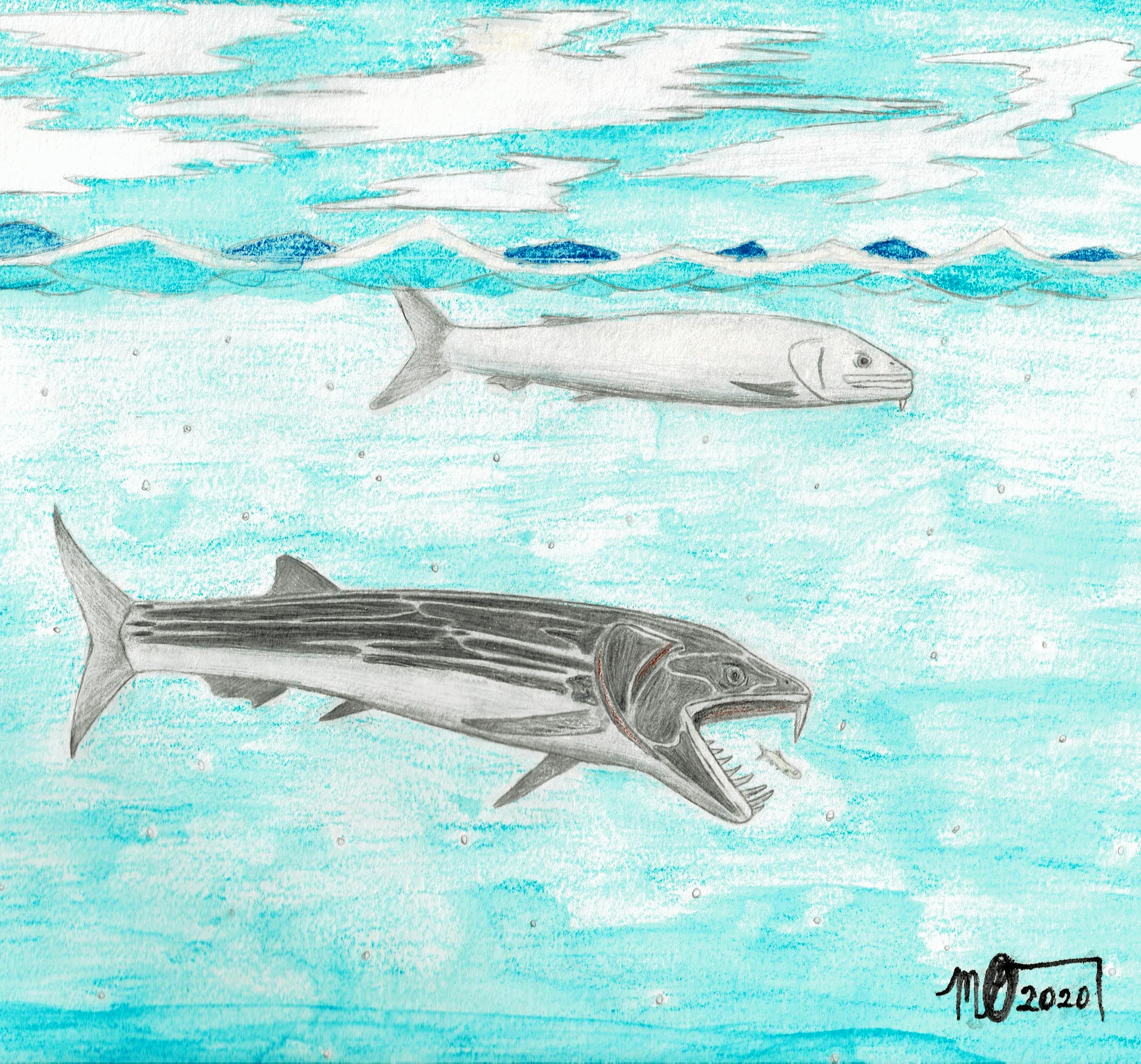
- Life restoration

Scientific classification
- Kingdom: Animalia
- Phylum: Chordata
- Class: Actinopterygii
- Order: Clupeiformes
- Superfamily: Engrauloidea
- Genus: †Monosmilus; Capobianco et al, 2020
- Species: †M. chureloides

Binomial name
- †Monosmilus chureloides Capobianco et al, 2020

= Monosmilus =

Monosmilus Temporal range: Lutetian

Extinct genus of fishes

Monosmilus is an extinct genus of prehistoric anchovy relative. It contains a single species, M. chureloides from the Middle Eocene (Lutetian)-aged Domanda Formation of Punjab, Pakistan.

Monosmilus was a large, predatory stem group-anchovy that may have reached up to 1 metre (3.3 ft) in length. Its most distinctive feature was a single, massive fang projecting downwards from vomerine region of the upper jaw. The genus name "Monosmilus" means "single knife" in Ancient Greek, referencing this fang, while the specific epithet "chureloides" references the Churel, a fanged, shapeshifting demon of Pakistani folklore.

The closest relative of Monosmilus is Clupeopsis, another stem-anchovy known from the earlier Eocene of Belgium, which had a similar "saber tooth"; no other fish, extant or extinct, is known to have a similar dentition to these two genera. Monosmilus and Clupeopsis together comprise a unique clade basal to modern anchovies, which are colloquially referred to as "saber-toothed anchovies". Unlike modern anchovies, which are planktivorous, the saber-toothed anchovies likely preyed on other fish; however, due to the lack of a modern analogue, the function of the saber tooth during feeding is uncertain. The saber-toothed anchovies were part of a wider radiation of predatory marine fish during the early Paleogene, in the aftermath of empty ecological niches remaining from the Cretaceous-Paleogene extinction event. However, despite their unique adaptations, they went extinct shortly afterwards.
