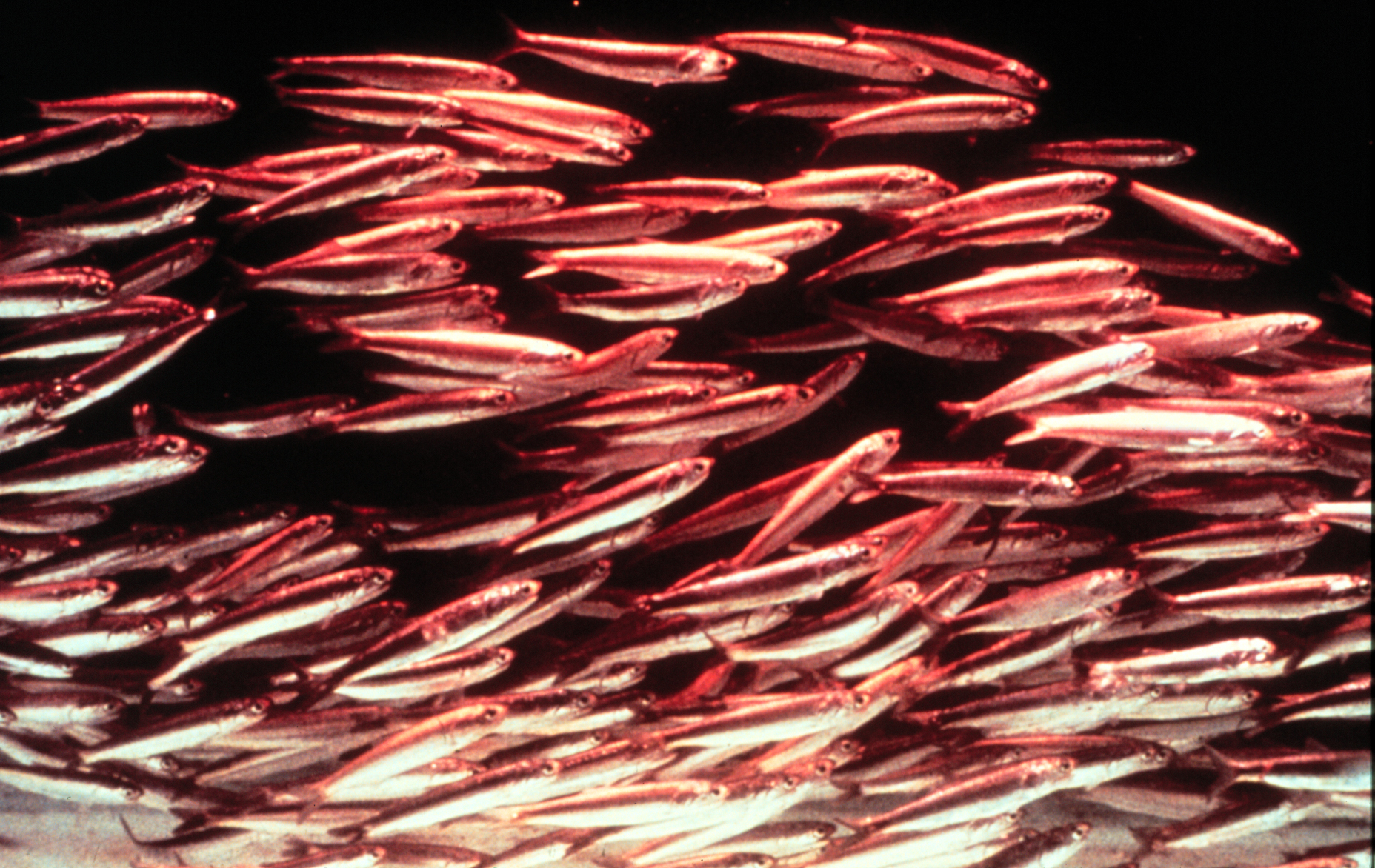
- A school of Californian anchovies (E. mordax)

Scientific classification
- Kingdom: Animalia
- Phylum: Chordata
- Class: Actinopterygii
- Division: Teleostei
- Order: Clupeiformes
- Family: Engraulidae
- Subfamily: Engraulinae
- Genus: Engraulis; Cuvier, 1816

Type species
- Clupea encrasicolus (Linnaeus, 1758)

Species
- See text.

= Engraulis =

Engraulis Temporal range: 11–0 Ma Late Miocene to Present

Genus of fishes

Engraulis is a genus of anchovies, currently containing 9 species. Species in this genus are found in the Pacific and Atlantic Oceans, as well as the Mediterranean Sea, and several of them are commercially important.

== Species ==
Engraulis currently contains the following 9 species:

- Engraulis albidus Borsa, Collet & J. D. Durand, 2004 (White anchovy)
- Engraulis anchoita C. L. Hubbs & Marini, 1935 (Argentine anchoita)
- Engraulis australis (Shaw, 1790) (Australian anchovy)
- Engraulis capensis Gilchrist, 1913 (Southern African anchovy)
- Engraulis encrasicolus (Linnaeus, 1758) (European anchovy)
- Engraulis eurystole (Swain & Meek, 1885) (Silver anchovy)
- Engraulis japonicus Temminck & Schlegel, 1846 (Japanese anchovy)
- Engraulis mordax Girard, 1854 (Californian anchovy)
- Engraulis ringens Jenyns, 1842 (Peruvian anchoveta)

Two fossil species are also assigned to this genus:

- †Engraulis macrocephalus Landini & Menesini, 1978 - Late Pliocene/Early Pleistocene of Italy
- †Engraulis tethensis Grande, 1985 - Late Miocene of Cyprus

Many other fossil species have been assigned to Engraulis, but a review of these specimens have found most to be far too fragmentary to be confidently assigned to this genus, and many may not even be clupeomorphs.
