= Southern African anchovy =

Conservation status
- Least Concern (IUCN 3.1)

Scientific classification
- Kingdom: Animalia
- Phylum: Chordata
- Class: Actinopterygii
- Order: Clupeiformes
- Family: Engraulidae
- Genus: Engraulis
- Species: E. capensis

Binomial name
- Engraulis capensis Gilchrist, 1913

Species of fish

The southern African anchovy (Engraulis capensis) is a species of anchovy which occurs in the southeast Atlantic Ocean near Namibia and South Africa.
