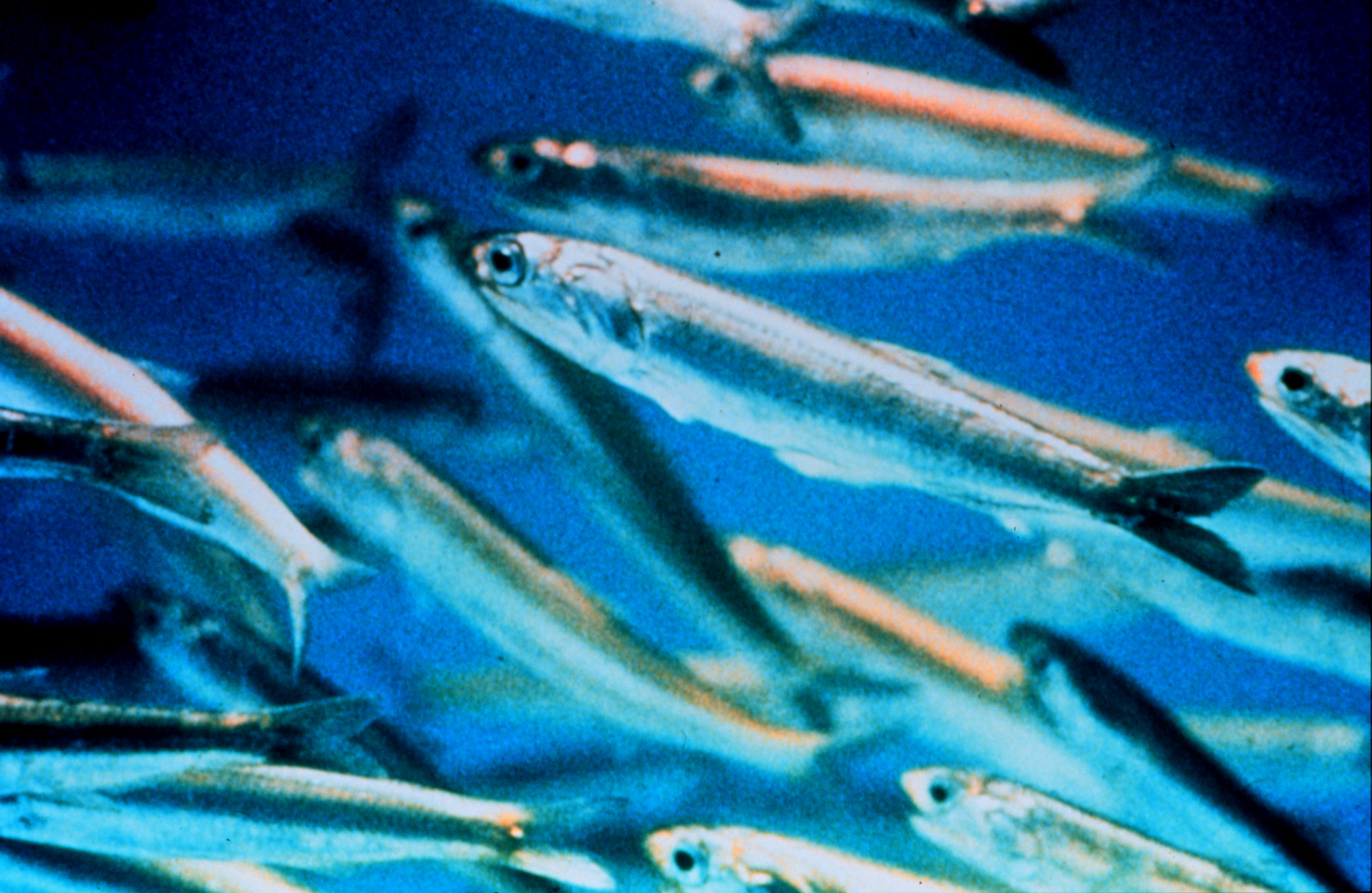
- Californian anchovy (Engraulis mordax)

Scientific classification
- Kingdom: Animalia
- Phylum: Chordata
- Class: Actinopterygii
- Division: Teleostei
- Order: Clupeiformes
- Suborder: Clupeoidei
- Superfamily: Engrauloidea; Grande, 1985
- Family: Engraulidae; Gill, 1861

Subfamilies and genera
- See text

= Anchovy =

Anchovies Temporal range: Early Eocene to present

Family of fishes

Anchovies are small, common forage fish of the family Engraulidae. Most species are found in marine waters, but several will enter brackish water, and some in South America are restricted to fresh water.

More than 140 species are placed in 16 genera; they are found in the Atlantic, Indian and Pacific Oceans, and in the Black Sea and the Mediterranean Sea. Anchovies are usually classified as oily fish.

== Taxonomy ==
Anchovies are classified into two subfamilies and 16 genera:

- Superfamily Engrauloidea
  - Family †Clupeopsidae Marramà & Carnevale, 2026
    - Genus †Clupeopsis Casier, 1946
    - Genus †Monosmilus Capobianco et al., 2020
  - Family Engraulidae Gill, 1861
    - Subfamily Engraulinae Gill, 1861
      - Genus Amazonsprattus Roberts, 1984
      - Genus Anchoa D. S. Jordan & Evermann, 1927
      - Genus Anchovia D. S. Jordan & Evermann, 1895
      - Genus Anchoviella Fowler, 1911
      - Genus Cetengraulis Günther, 1868
      - Genus Encrasicholina Fowler, 1938
      - Genus †Eoengraulis Marrama & Carnevale, 2015
      - Genus Engraulis Cuvier, 1816
      - Genus Jurengraulis Whitehead, 1988
      - Genus Lycengraulis Günther, 1868
      - Genus Pterengraulis Günther, 1868
      - Genus Stolephorus Lacépède, 1803
    - Subfamily Coiliinae Bleeker, 1870
      - Genus Coilia Gray 1830
      - Genus Lycothrissa Günther, 1868
      - Genus Papuengraulis Munro, 1964
      - Genus Setipinna Swainson 1839
      - Genus Thryssa Cuvier, 1829

=== Evolution ===
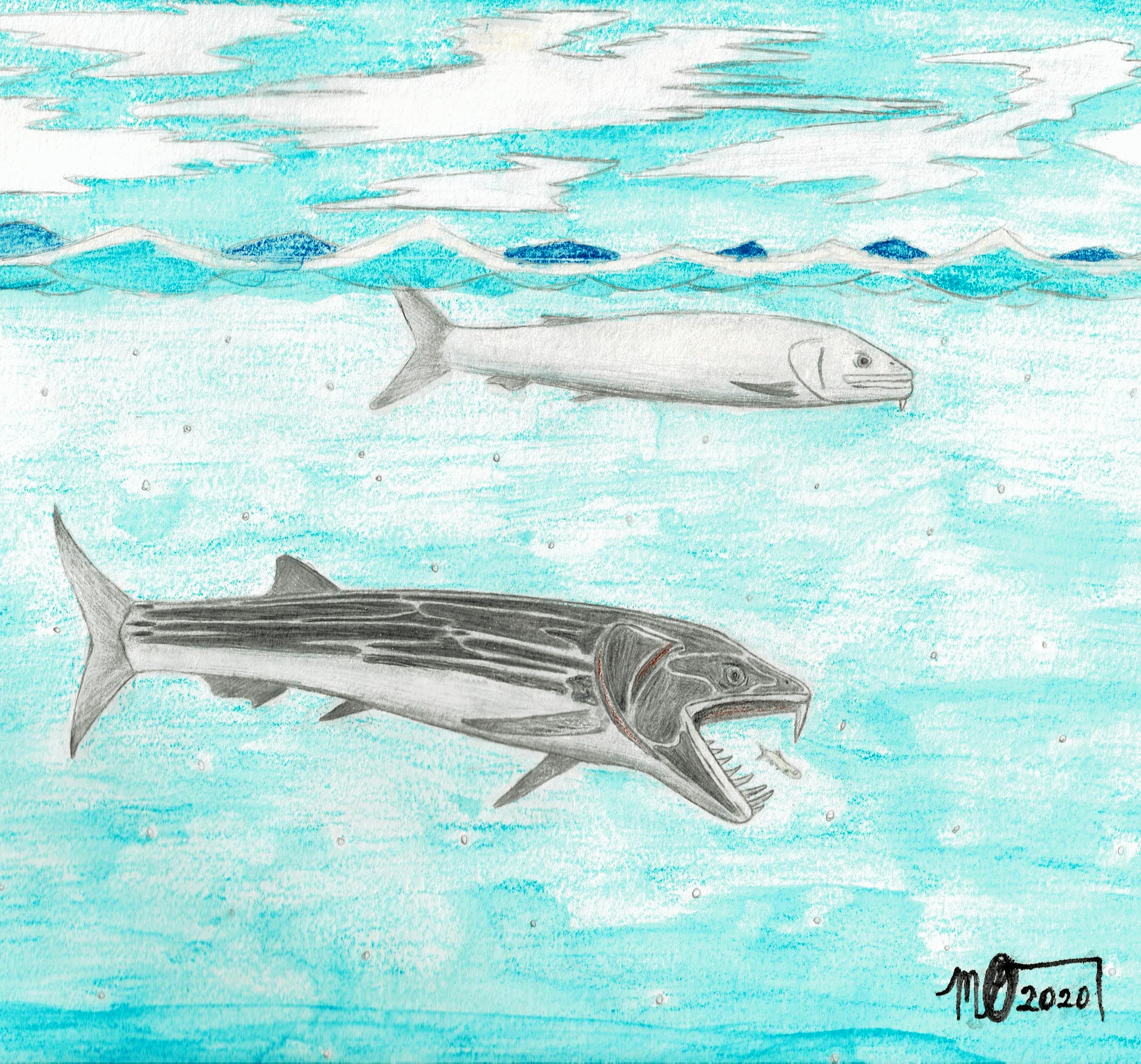
Life restoration of the extinct "saber-toothed anchovy" Monosmilus

The earliest known fossil records of anchovy relatives are of large predatory stem-anchovies (Clupeopsis and Monosmilus) from the early and middle Eocene of the Tethys Ocean, in Belgium and Pakistan. The large fangs of these early anchovy relatives has led to the nickname "saber-toothed anchovies" (not to be confused with the extant genus Lycengraulis). The earliest record of a true anchovy is of the stem-engrauline Eoengraulis from the Early Eocene of Monte Bolca, Italy.

Despite their abundance in the modern day and their tendency to form huge schools, anchovies are relatively rare in the fossil record. Many species that were formerly considered fossil anchovies are thought to either not be anchovies or are too fragmentary to confidently assign to this group. The rarity of anchovies in the fossil record may be an artifact of preservation; fossil anchovies are only recognizable as such when well-preserved, but anchovies tend to inhabit highly turbid nearshore marine environments where preservation as fossils is much less likely, while well-preserved fossil fishes tend to be found in deposits formed in deeper water.

== Characteristics ==
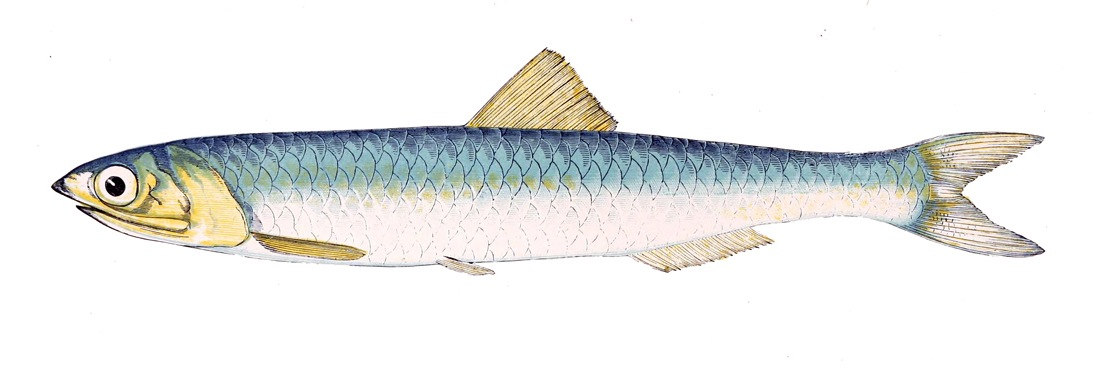
European anchovy, Engraulis encrasicolus

Anchovies are small, green fish with blue reflections due to a silver-colored longitudinal stripe that runs from the base of the caudal (tail) fin. They range from 2 to 40 centimetres (1 to 15 1/2 inches) in adult length, and their body shapes are variable with more slender fish in northern populations.

The snout is blunt with tiny, sharp teeth in both jaws. The snout contains a unique rostral organ, believed to be electro-sensory in nature, although its exact function is unknown. The mouth is larger than that of herrings and silversides, two fish which anchovies closely resemble in other respects. The anchovy eats plankton and recently hatched fish.

== Distribution ==
Anchovies are found in scattered areas throughout the world's oceans, but are concentrated in temperate waters, and are rare or absent in very cold or very warm seas. They are generally very accepting of a wide range of temperatures and salinity. Large schools can be found in shallow, brackish areas with muddy bottoms, as in estuaries and bays.

The European anchovy is abundant in the Mediterranean, particularly in the Alboran Sea, Aegean Sea and the Black Sea. This species is regularly caught along the coasts of Crete, Greece, Sicily, Italy, France, Turkey, Northern Iran, Portugal and Spain. They are also found on the coast of northern Africa. The range of the species also extends along the Atlantic coast of Europe to the south of Norway. Spawning occurs between October and March, but not in water colder than 12 °C (54 °F). The anchovy appears to spawn at least 100 kilometres (55 nautical miles) from the shore, near the surface of the water.

== Ecology ==
The anchovy is a significant food source for almost every predatory fish in its environment, including the California halibut, rock fish, yellowtail, shark, chinook, and coho salmon. It is also extremely important to marine mammals and birds; for example, breeding success of California brown pelicans and elegant terns is strongly connected to anchovy abundance.

== Feeding behavior ==
Anchovies, like most clupeoids (herrings, sardines and anchovies), are filter-feeders that open their mouths as they swim. As water passes through the mouth and out the gills, food particles are sieved by gill rakers and transferred into the esophagus.

== Commercial species ==
Commercially significant species
Common name	Scientific name	Maximum length	Common length	Maximum weight	Maximum age	Trophic level	Fish Base	FAO	ITIS	IUCN status
European anchovy*	Engraulis encrasicolus (Linnaeus, 1758)	20.0 cm (8 in)	13.5 cm (5 1/2 in)	49 g (1 3/4 oz)	5 years	3.11				Least concern
Argentine anchoita	Engraulis anchoita (Hubbs & Marini, 1935)	17.0 cm (6 1/2 in)	10.0 cm (4 in)	25 g (7/8 oz)	? years	2.51				Least concern
Californian anchovy	Engraulis mordax (Girard, 1856)	24.8 cm (10 in)	15.0 cm (6 in)	68 g (2 3/8 oz)	7 years	2.96				Least concern
Japanese anchovy	Engraulis japonicus (Temminck & Schlegel, 1846)	18.0 cm (7 in)	14.0 cm (5 1/2 in)	45 g (1 5/8 oz)	4 years	2.60				Least concern
Peruvian anchoveta	Engraulis ringens (Jenyns, 1842)	20.0 cm (8 in)	14.0 cm (5 1/2 in)	? g	3 years	2.70				Least concern
Southern African anchovy	Engraulis capensis (Gilchrist, 1913)	17.0 cm (6 1/2 in)	11.0 cm (4 1/2 in) ((L_{inf}+L_{m})/2)	? g	? years	2.80				Least concern

* Type species

== Fisheries ==
Global capture of anchovy in tonnes reported by the FAO

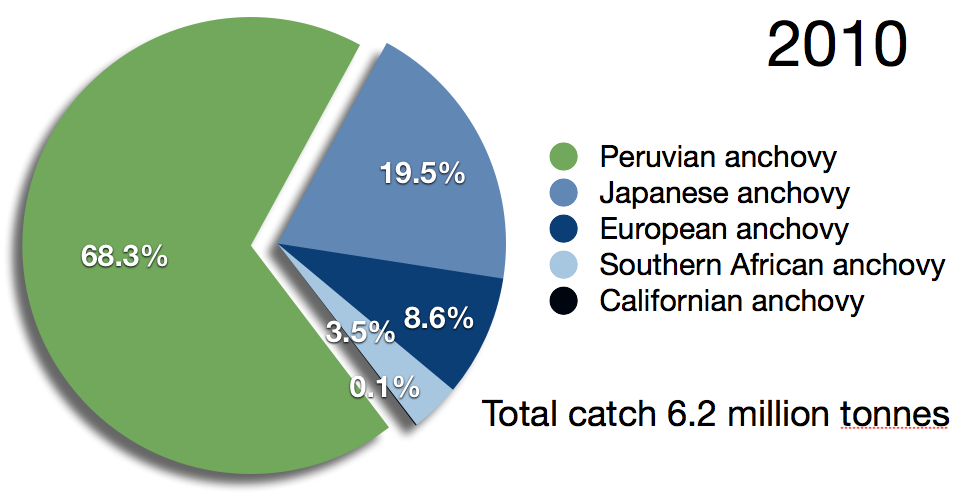
Capture of all anchovy reported by the FAO (green indicates Peruvian anchoveta)

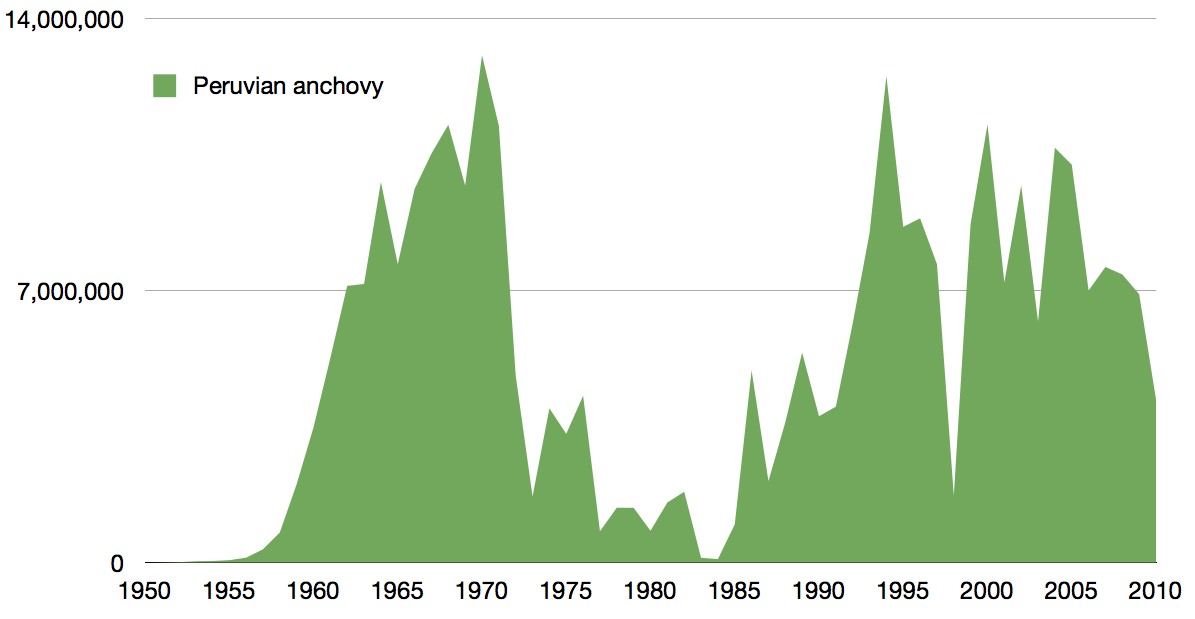
↑ Peruvian anchoveta 1950–2010

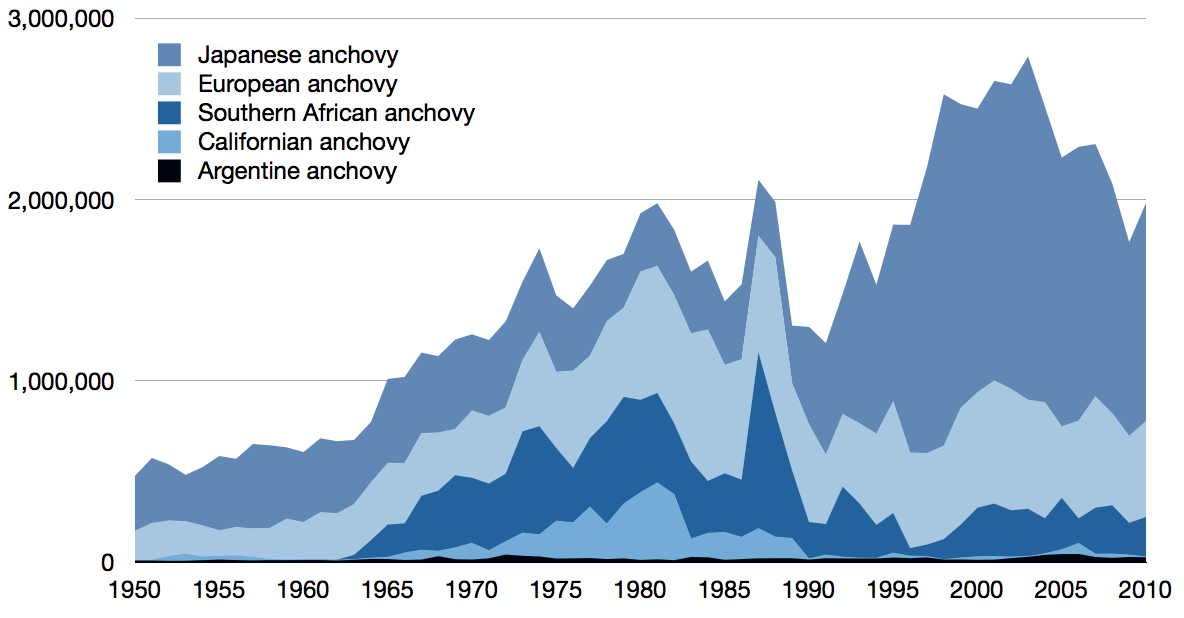
↑ Other anchovy 1950–2010

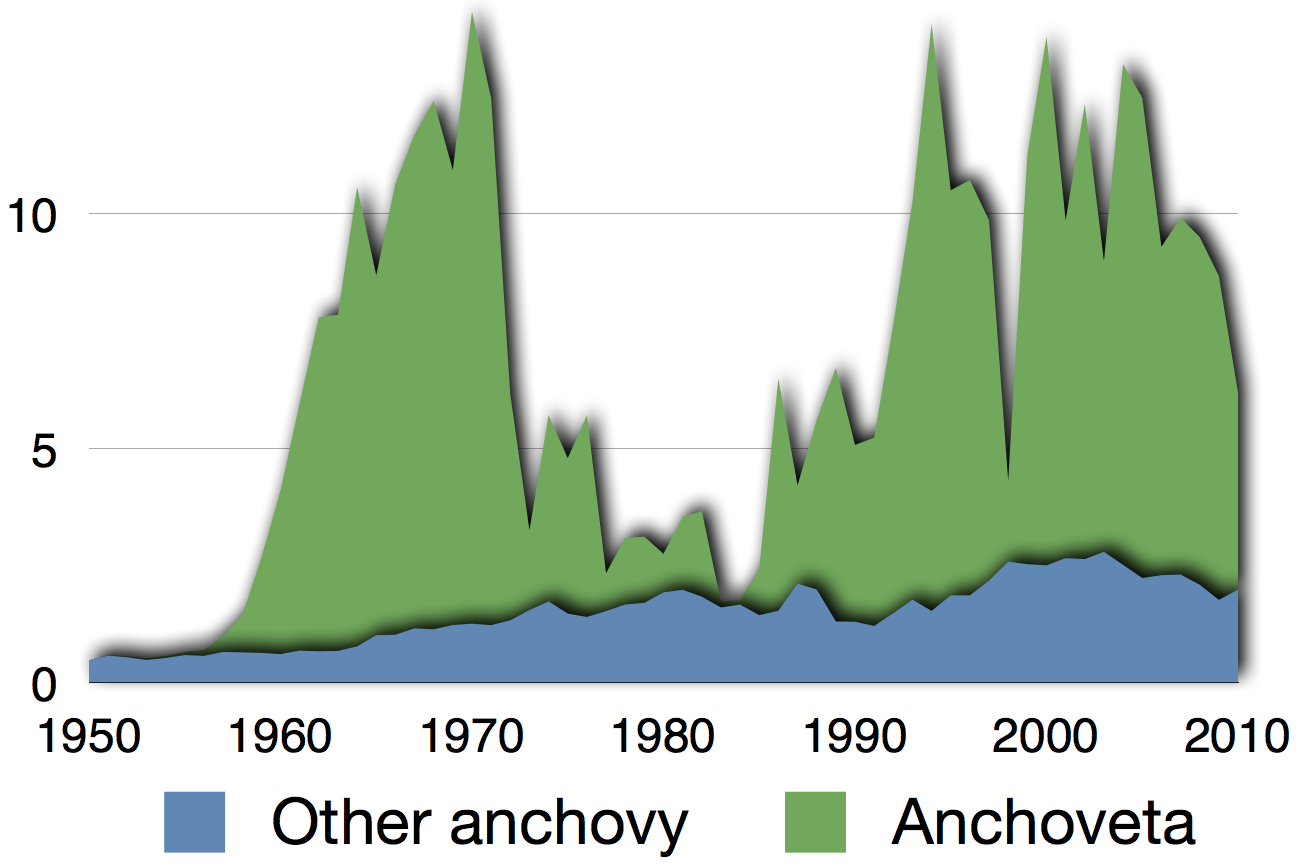
Global commercial capture of anchovy in million tonnes 1950–2010

=== Black Sea ===
On average, the Turkish commercial fishing fleet catches around 300,000 tons per year, mainly in winter. The largest catch is in November and December.

=== Peru ===
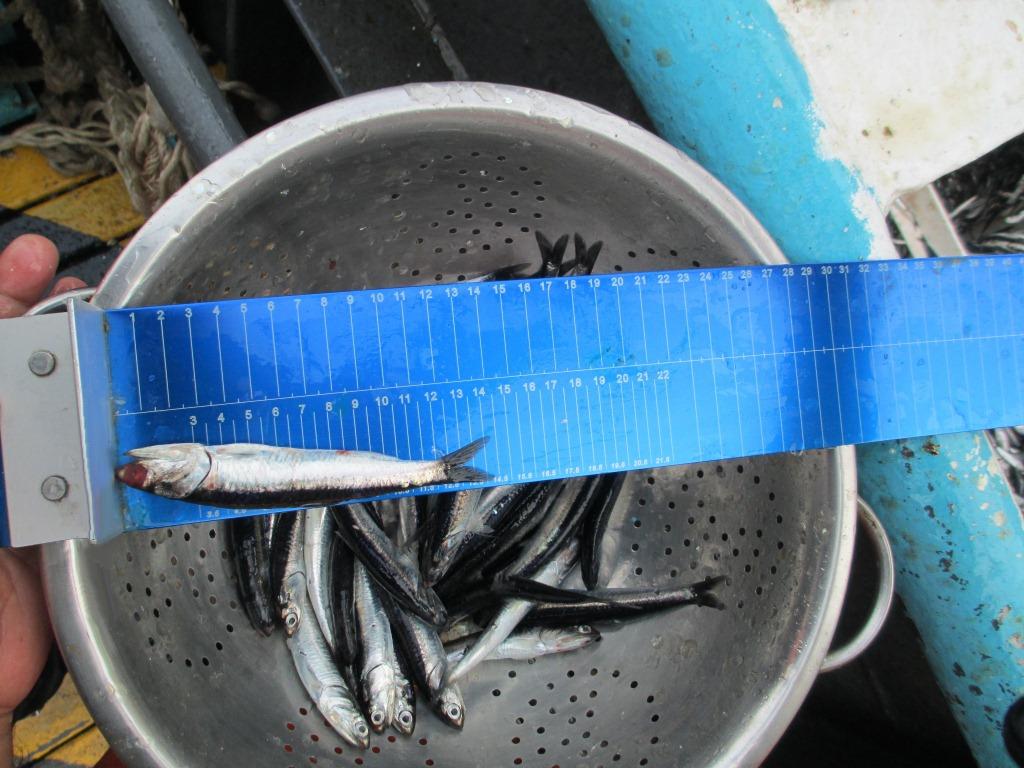
Peruvian anchoveta (E. ringens), one of the most commercially important fish species

The Peruvian anchovy fishery is one of the largest in the world, far exceeding catches of the other anchovy species.

In 1972, it collapsed catastrophically due to the combined effects of overfishing and El Niño and did not fully recover for two decades.

== As food ==
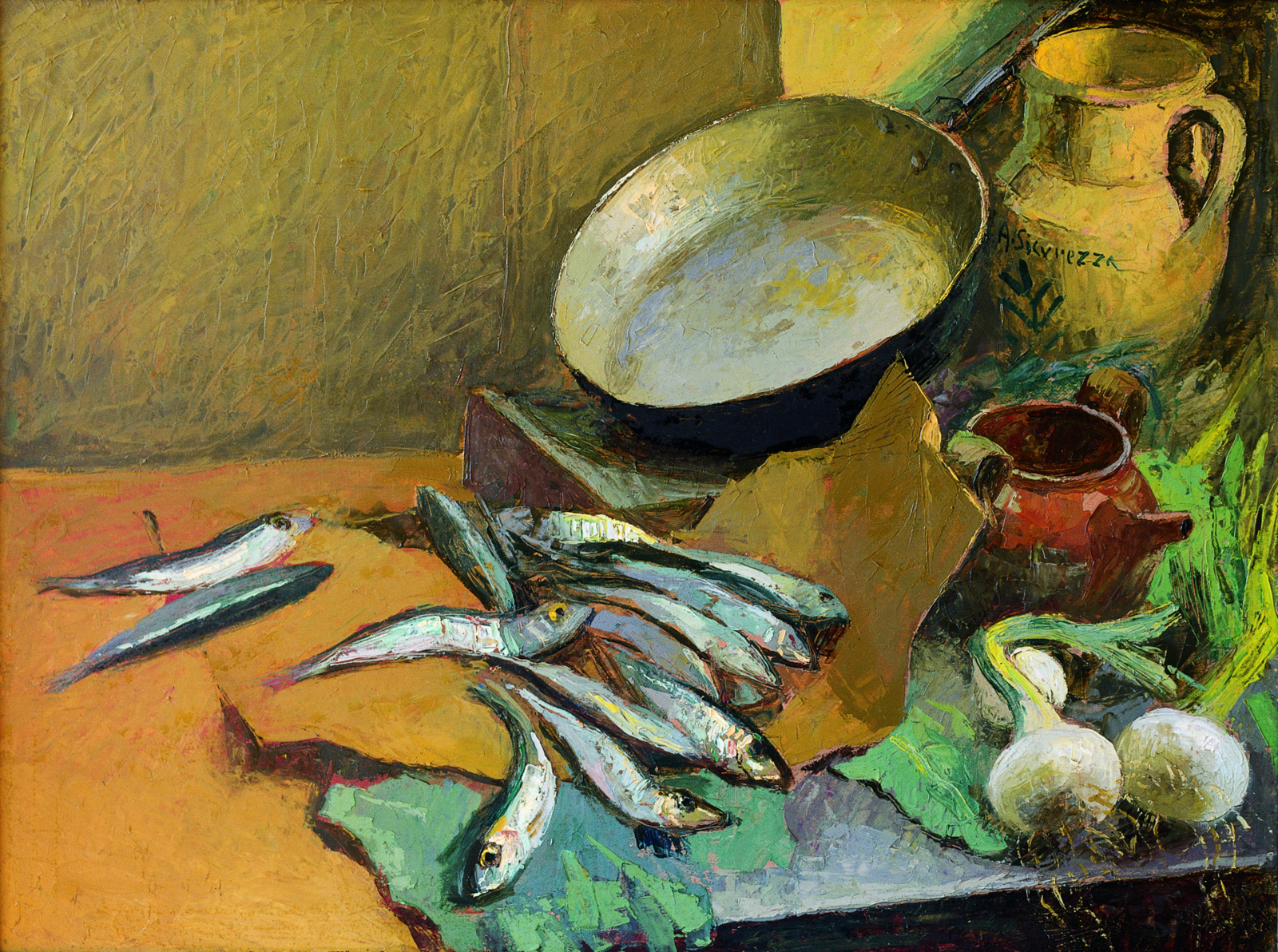
Still Life with Anchovies, 1972, Antonio Sicurezza

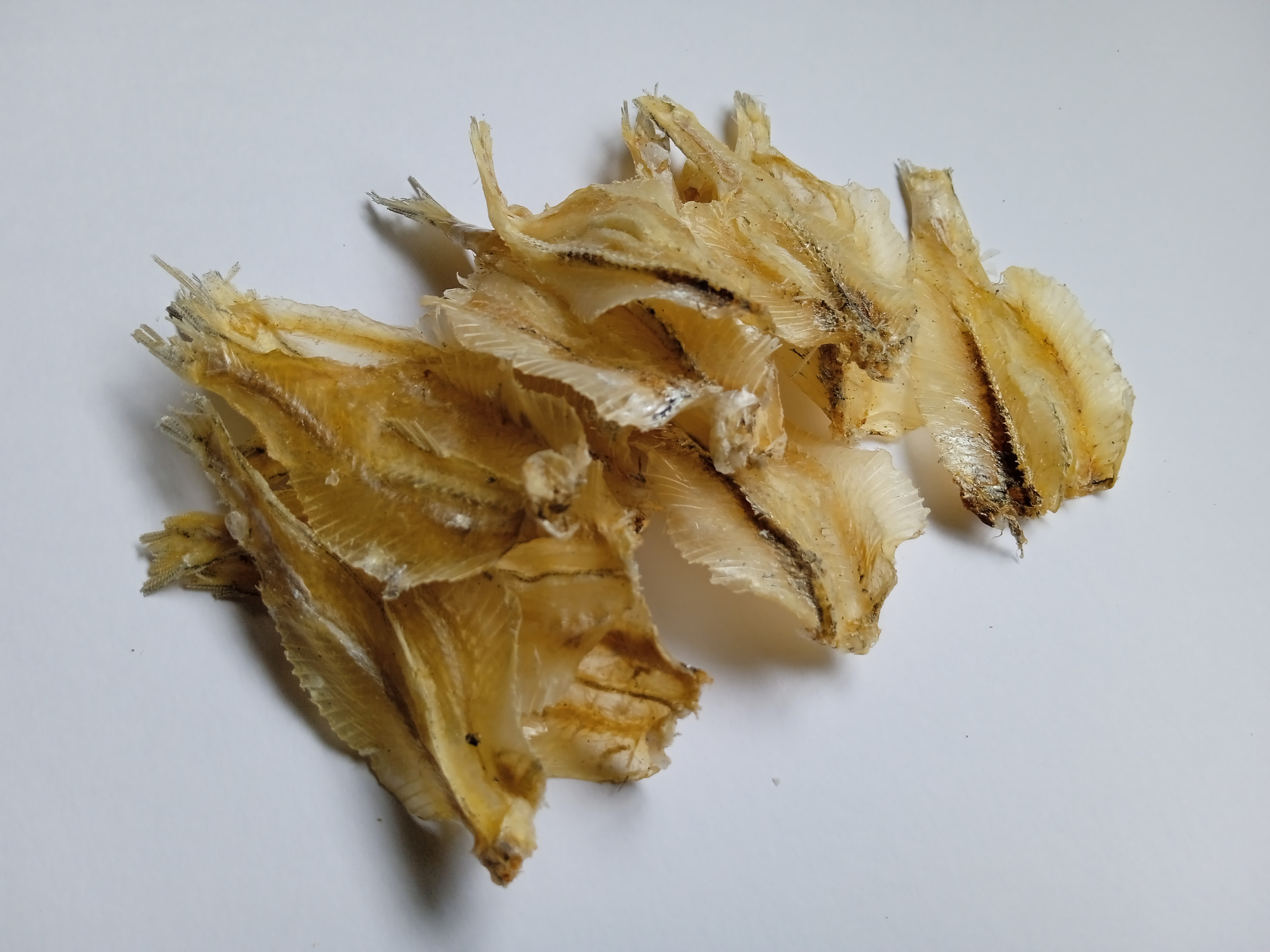
Dried Thryssa mystax (bulu ayam) fish served as food in Malaysian cuisine

A traditional method of processing and preserving anchovies is to gut and salt them in brine, allow them to cure, and then pack them in oil or salt. This results in a characteristic strong flavor and the flesh turning a deep grey. Pickled in vinegar, as with Spanish boquerones, anchovies are milder and the flesh retains a white color. In Roman times, anchovies were the base for the fermented fish sauce garum. Garum had a sufficiently long shelf life for long-distance commerce, and was produced in industrial quantities. Anchovies were also eaten raw as an aphrodisiac.

Today, they are used in small quantities to flavor many dishes. Because of the strong flavor, they are also an ingredient in several sauces and condiments, including Worcestershire sauce, caesar salad dressing, remoulade, Gentleman's Relish, many fish sauces, and in some versions of Café de Paris butter. For domestic use, anchovy fillets are packed in oil or salt in small tins or jars, sometimes rolled around capers. Anchovy paste is also available. Fishermen also use anchovies as bait for larger fish, such as tuna and sea bass.

The strong taste people associate with anchovies is due to the curing process. Fresh anchovies, known in Italy as alici, have a much milder flavor. The anchovies from Barcola (in the local dialect: sardoni barcolani) are particularly popular. These white fleshy fish, which are only found at Sirocco in the Gulf of Trieste, achieve the highest prices.

In Sweden and Finland, the name "anchovies" is related strongly to a traditional seasoning, hence the product "anchovies" is normally made of sprats and herring can be sold as "anchovy-spiced". Fish from the family Engraulidae are instead known as sardell in Sweden and sardelli in Finland, leading to confusion when translating recipes.

In Southeast Asian countries like Indonesia, Singapore, Malaysia and the Philippines, they are deep-fried and eaten as a snack or a side dish. They are known as ikan bilis in Malay, ikan teri in Indonesian and dilis in Filipino.

== See also ==
- Sardine
