= List of fish sauces =

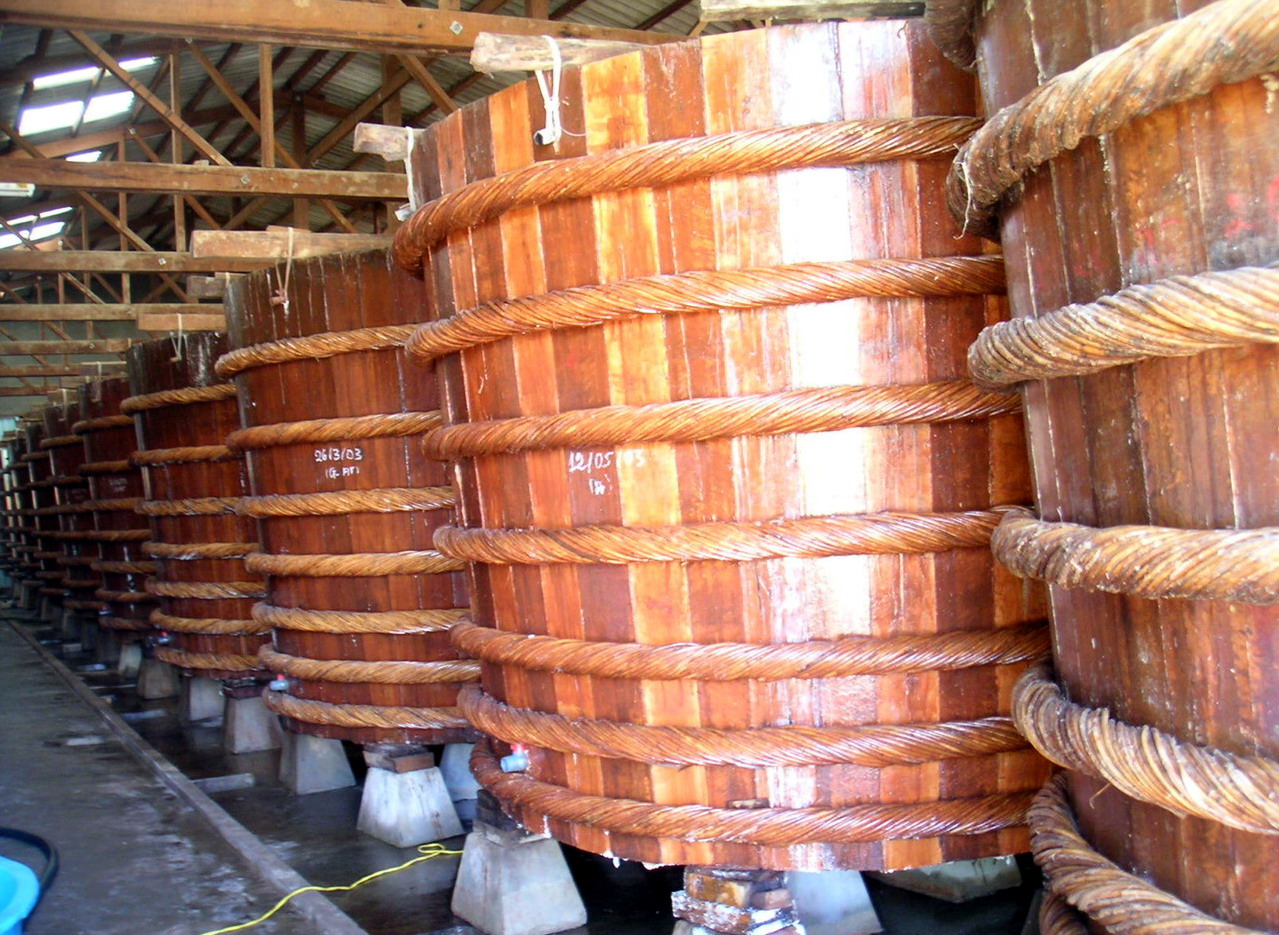
Fish sauce fermenting in large barrels in Phú Quốc

Fish sauce is an amber-colored liquid extracted from the fermentation of fish with sea salt. It is used as a condiment in various cuisines. Fish sauce is a common ingredient in numerous culinary cultures in Southeast Asia and the coastal regions of East Asia, and features heavily in Cambodian, Filipino, Thai, and Vietnamese cuisine.

== Fish sauces ==
=== A ===
- Anchovy essence – used as a flavoring for soups, sauces, and other dishes, anchovy essence is a pink-colored, thick, oily sauce, consisting of pounded anchovies, spices and other ingredients.

=== B ===
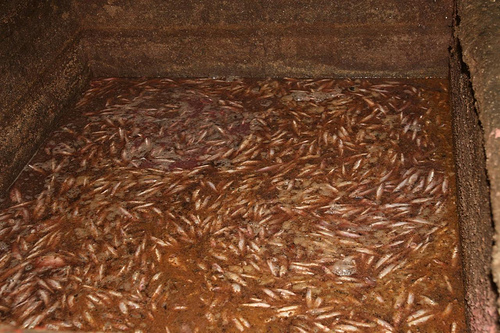
Bagoong

- Bagoóng – a Philippine condiment made of partially or completely fermented fish or shrimps and salt. The fermentation process also produces a fish sauce known as patís.
- Bagoóng monamon – a common ingredient used in Filipino cuisine and particularly in Northern Ilocano cuisine. It is made by fermenting salted anchovies and is used as a cooking ingredient.
- Bagoóng terong – a common ingredient used in the Philippines and particularly in Northern Ilocano cuisine. It is made by salting and fermenting the bonnet mouth fish.
- Budu sauce – a well-known fermented seafood product in Kelantan, Malaysia as well as Southern Thailand. It is traditionally made by mixing anchovy and salt in the range of ratio of 2:1 to 6:1 and allowing to ferment for 140 to 200 days. It is used as a flavoring and is normally eaten with fish, rice and raw vegetables.
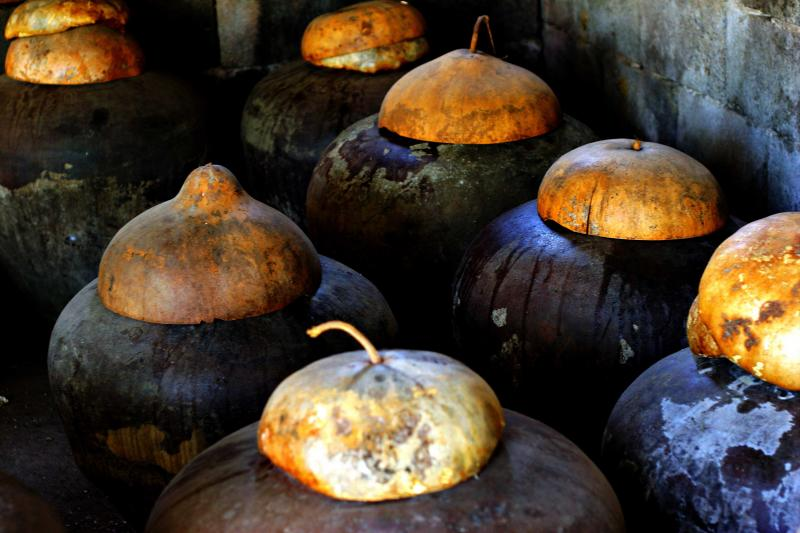
Bagoong fermenting in burnay jars in the province of Ilocos Norte, Philippines

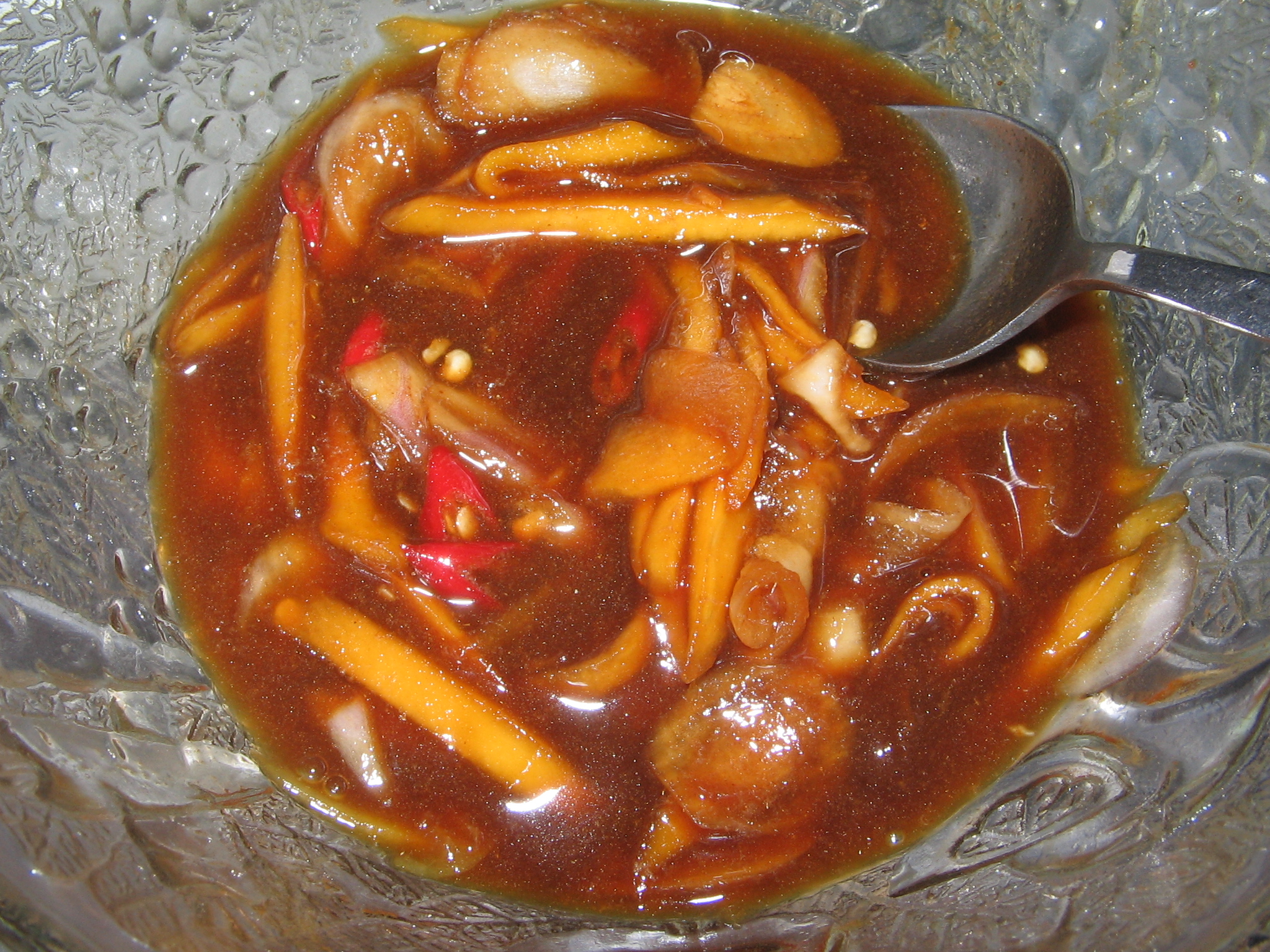
Budu sauce in Kelantan, Malaysia

=== C ===
- Cincalok – a Malaccan food (see cuisine of Malaysia) made of fermented small shrimp or krill. It is usually served as a condiment together with chillis, shallots and lime juice.
- Colatura di Alici – an Italian fish sauce prepared with anchovies, from the small fishing village of Cetara, Campania.

=== D ===
- Dayok – a type of fish sauce originating from the Visayas and Mindanao islands of the Philippines made from fermented yellowfin tuna entrails.

=== G ===
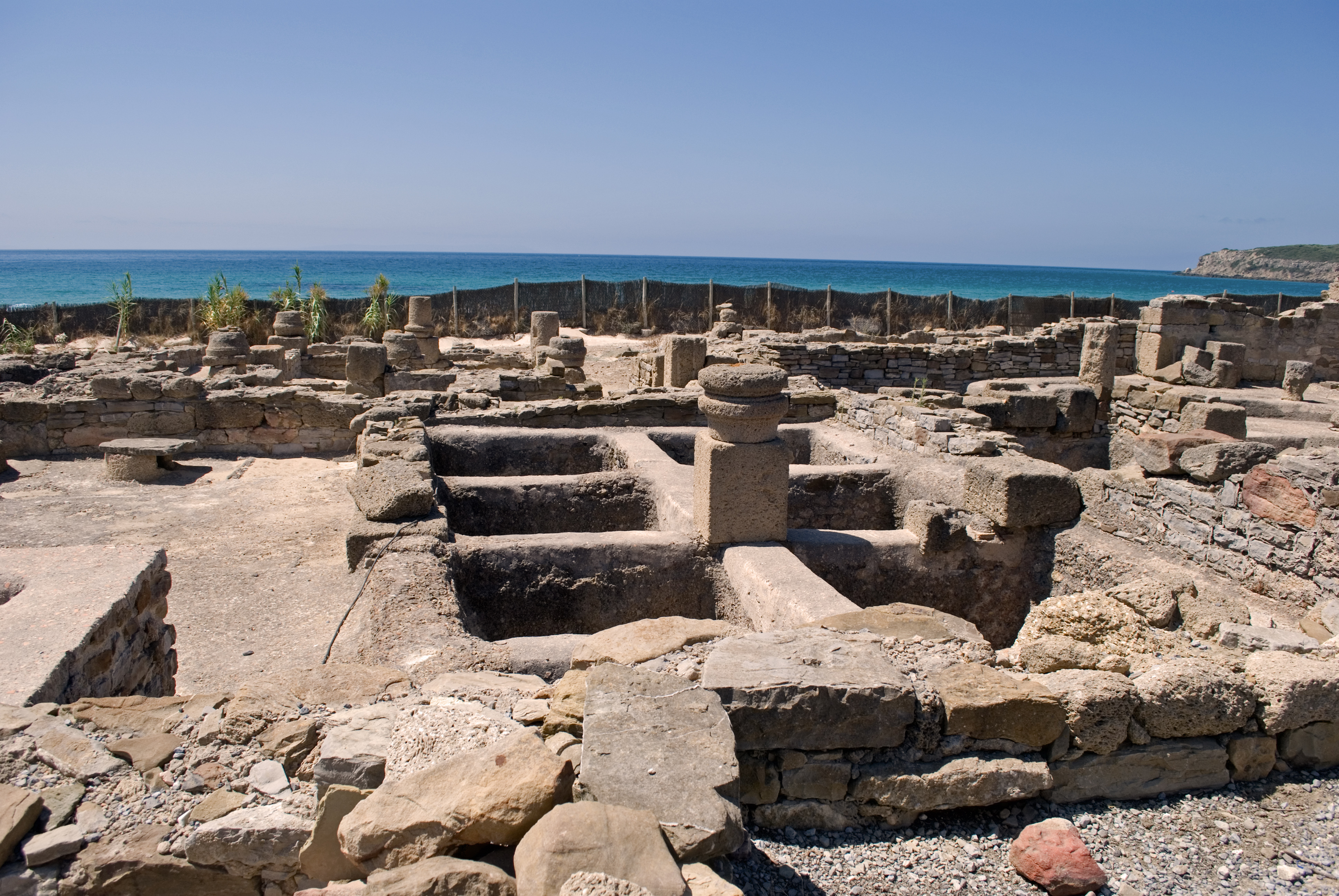
The ruins of a garum factory in Baelo Claudia, Spain

- Garum – a fermented fish sauce that was used in the cuisines of ancient Greece, Rome, and Byzantium. Garum was prepared from the intestines of small fish through the process of bacterial fermentation.

=== M ===
- Mahyawa – a tangy fish sauce made from salted anchovies and ingredients such as fennel seeds, cumin seeds, coriander seeds and mustard seeds. Originally from the southern coastal regions of Iran, it has become a popular food item among Arab states of the Persian Gulf, brought by the migration of the Persian Huwala and Ajam communities to the region.
- Mắm nêm is a sauce made of fermented fish. Unlike the more familiar nước mắm (fish sauce), mắm nêm is powerfully pungent, similar to shrimp paste.

=== N ===
- Nam pla - Thailand.
- Nước mắm - Vietnam.

=== P ===
- Padaek – a traditional Lao condiment made from pickled or fermented fish that has been cured. Often known as Lao fish sauce, it is a thicker, seasoned fish sauce that often contains chunks of fish in it. Also widely consumed in N.E. Thailand (Isaan) and known by the Lao name.
- Phu quoc fish sauce – a specific variety of fish sauce produced on Phu Quoc island in southwest Vietnam. Since 2001, the Industrial Property Department of the government of Vietnam has the name "Phu Quoc Fish Sauce" as a trademark, and only registered manufacturers are allowed to use the name in Vietnam.
- Pla ra – made by pickling several varieties of fish, mainly Snakehead Murrel (Channa striata), the fish is cleaned and cut into pieces, after which it is mixed with salt and rice bran.
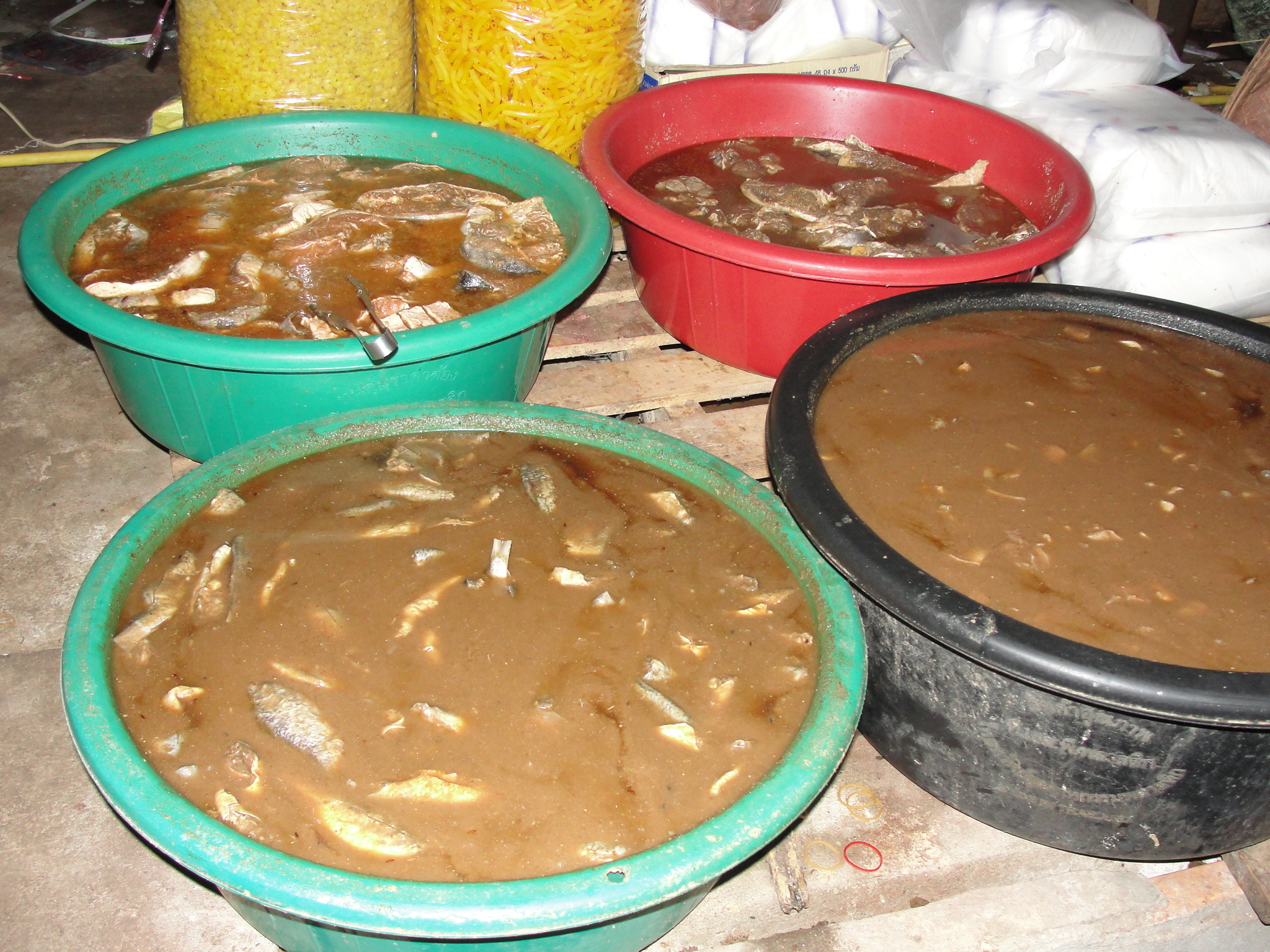
Fish sauce at a market in Vientiane, Laos

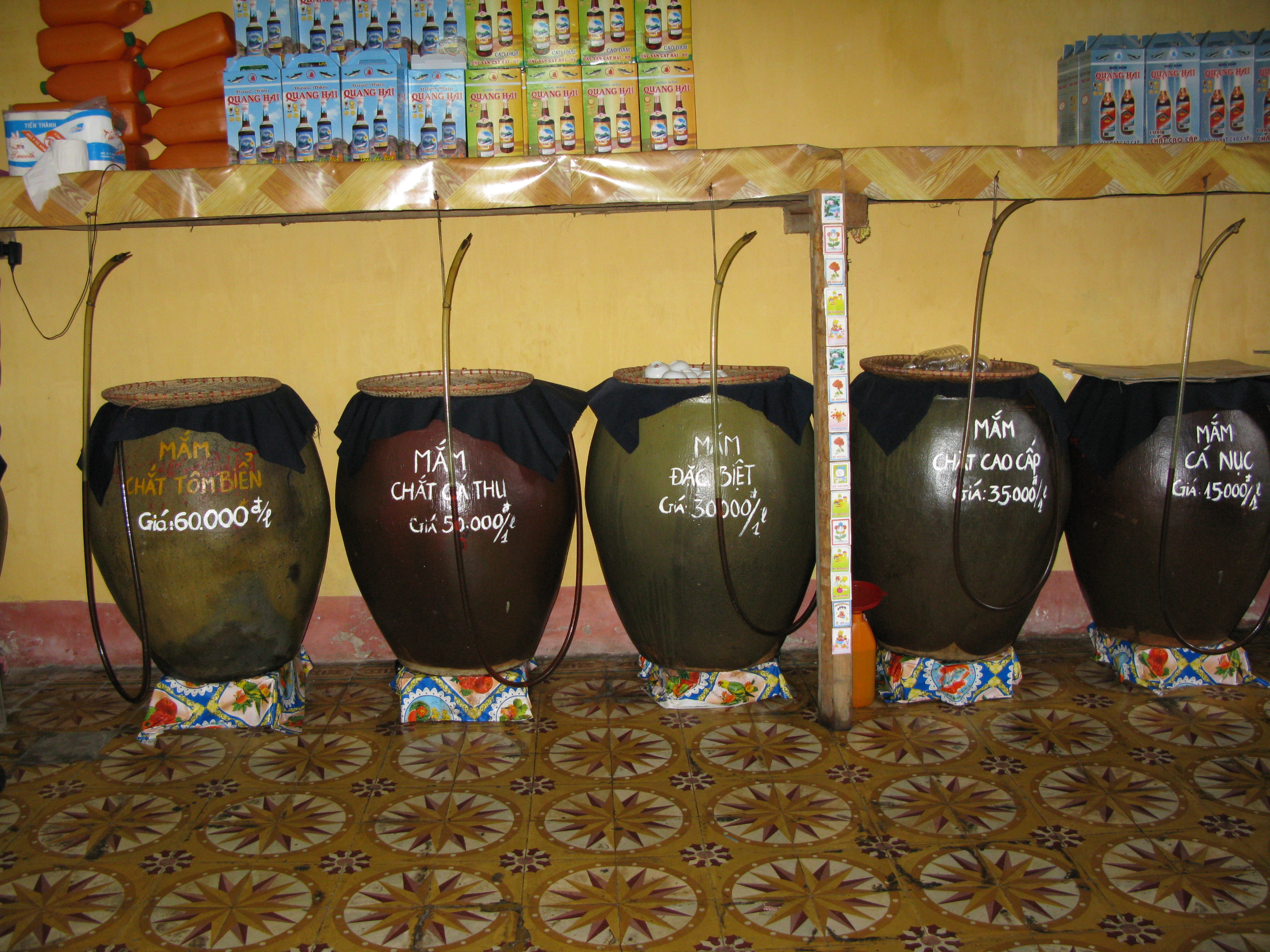
Large containers of fish sauce for sale in Vietnam

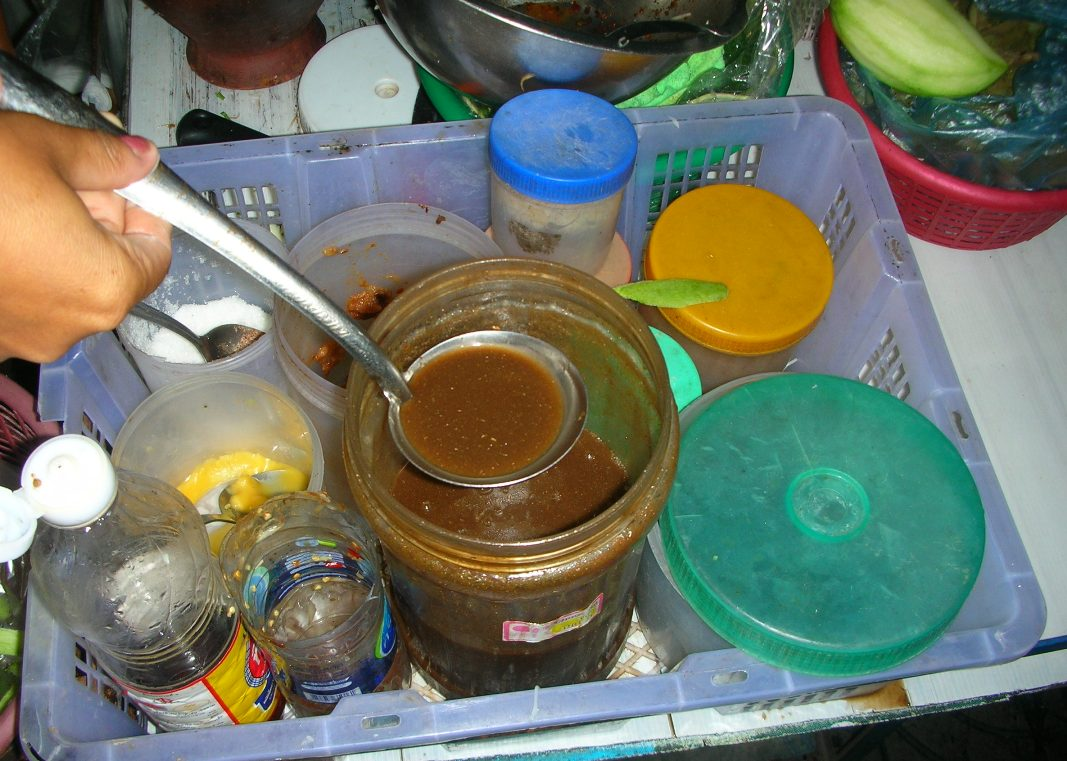
Pla ra at a vendor's food cart in Bangkok, Thailand

=== S ===
- Shottsuru (Japanese: しょっつる) – a pungent regional Japanese fish sauce, usually made from salefin sandfish (Japanese: はたはた, romanized: hatahata), and its production is associated with the Akita region of northern part of Japan.

=== W ===
- Worcestershire sauce – a fermented liquid condiment made with anchovy, it is primarily used to flavor meat or fish dishes. It originated in Worcester, England, and was invented by John Wheeley Lea and William Henry Perrins. The Lea & Perrins brand was commercialized in 1837 and has been produced in the current Midlands Road factory in Worcester since October 16, 1897.
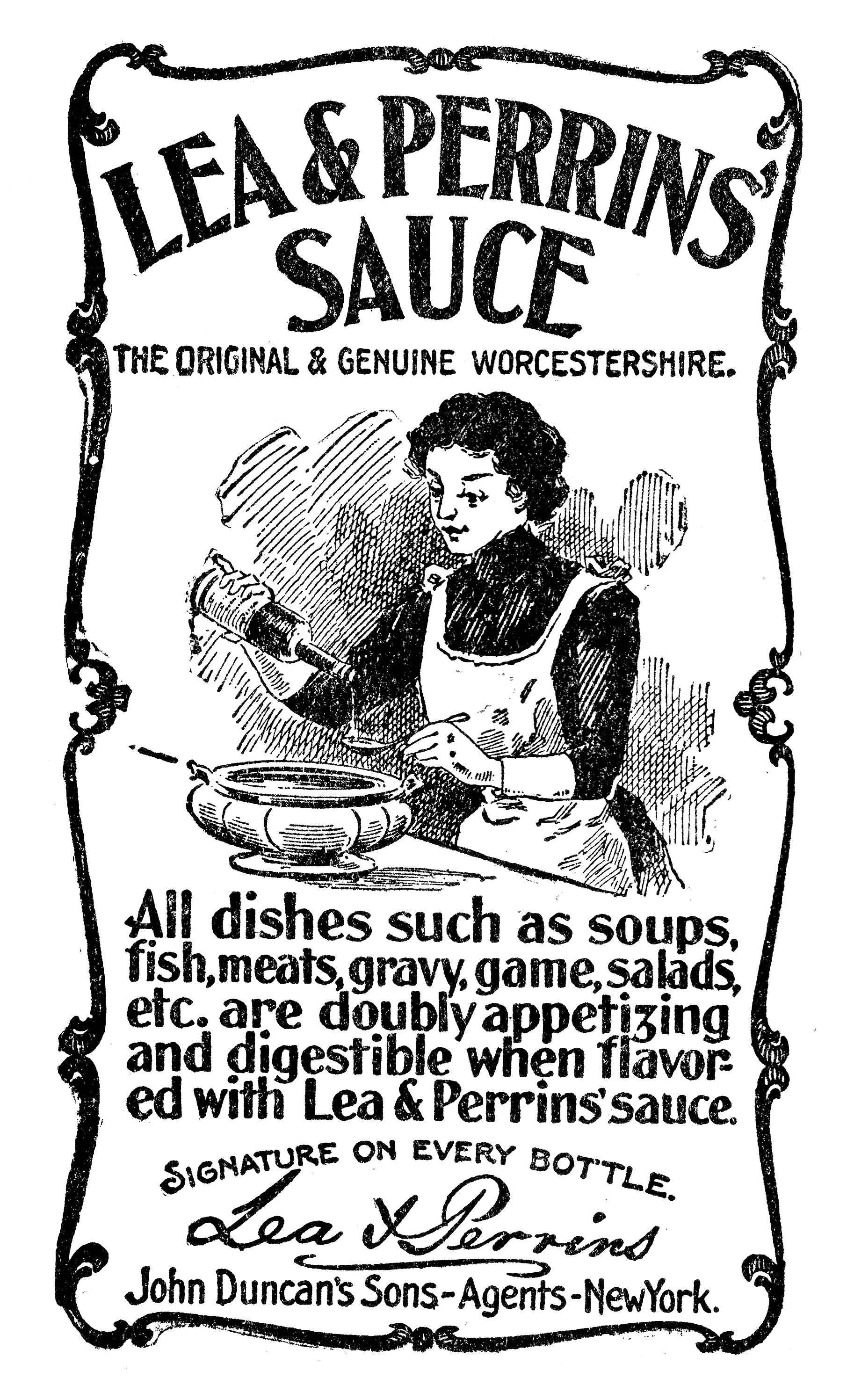
A 1900 advertisement for Lea & Perrins Worcestershire sauce

A label for the Australian Lionel Brand Worcestershire Sauce

== See also ==
- Fish paste
- List of condiments
- List of fermented foods
- List of fish pastes
- List of sauces
