= Dyson Perrins Church of England Academy =

Dyson Perrins CofE Academy

Location
- Yates Hay Road; Malvern, Worcestershire, WR14 1WD; England; 52.132856°N 2.32908°W

Information
- Type: Academy
- Motto: To Love To Learn
- Religious affiliation: Church of England
- Established: founded October 27, 1956, opened 1959
- Founder: Charles William Dyson Perrins
- Local authority: Worcestershire County Council
- Department for Education URN: 137186 Tables
- Ofsted: Reports
- Chair: Paul Charman
- Headteacher: Mike Gunston
- Gender: Mixed
- Age: 11 to 18
- Enrolment: 657 as of January 2015
- Website: http://www.dysonperrins.worcs.sch.uk/

Dyson Perrins CofE Academy is a co-educational secondary school in Malvern, Worcestershire, England. It is named after its benefactor Charles William Dyson Perrins, heir to the Lea & Perrins Worcestershire sauce company. It is located near Malvern Link, a northern suburb of the town of Malvern, Worcestershire.

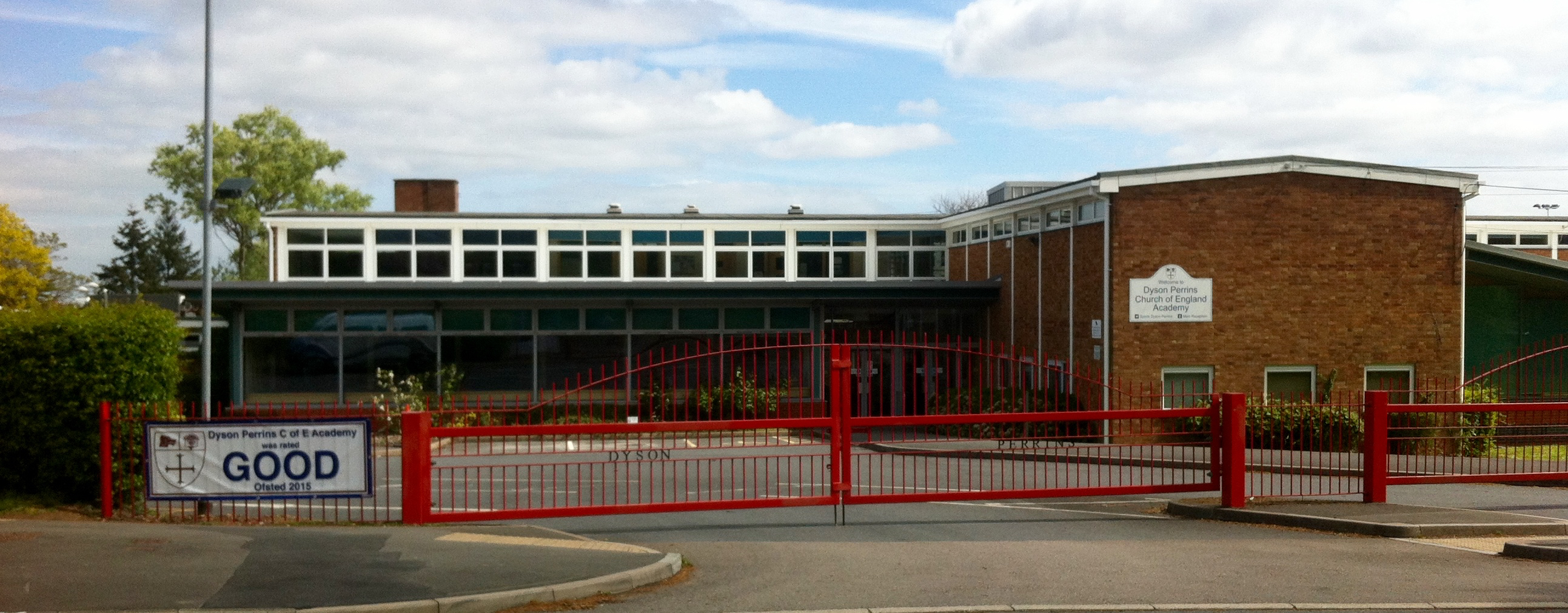
Dyson Perrins C of E Academy, Malvern, Worcestershire

== History ==
The Church of England, under the Director of Education at the Diocese of Worcester, Canon Rees-Jones, had a plan to build a secondary school in the North of Malvern. This was frustrated by the raising of the school leaving age. The increased pupil numbers required a larger school, which exceeded the amount allotted by the Diocese. Canon Bamber, of Holy Trinity Church, approached C W Dyson Perrins, who agreed to finance the actual building costs, a sum of £10,000.

He was present for the laying of the foundation stone in 1956, but had died before its opening. His wife, Frieda Dyson Perrins, continued her family association with the school, helping to build future extensions.

The Church of England Dyson Perrins Secondary School, as it was named, was finally opened in 1959, at the time being the only secondary school in the county with a chapel incorporated into its design. The first headmaster of the school was Mr Sydney Bormond. The school was later renamed Dyson Perrins High School.

An inspection in January 2015 by the Office for Standards in Education (Ofsted), found the school to be 'Good'. Another inspection in 2018 found that the school continued to be Good.

Previously a voluntary aided school administered by Worcestershire County Council, in August 2011 Dyson Perrins CofE Sports College converted to academy status and was renamed Dyson Perrins Church of England Academy.

== Blocks ==
The school is split into four buildings or 'blocks' in which different subjects are taught. The first block (referred to as 'A block') is the oldest block in the school. This block is split into two parts: one containing technology classrooms, workshops and two dedicated computer suites, and the other containing a variety of rooms including the main hall, reception and learning support centre. This part of A Block also houses English, Food Technology, Textiles and Art classrooms. 'A block' also houses the Able Autism Base, a section of the school dedicated to supporting and including students with Asperger's Syndrome and High Functioning Autism, and one computer suite.

'B block' houses Mathematics, Science and History.

'C block' houses Performing Arts, Computing, Business, Music and Geography and has four dedicated computer suites.

'D block' holds the PE, RE, PSHE, and languages classrooms.

== Headteachers ==
- Sydney Bormond 1959 to 1977
- William 'Bill' Lucas 1977 to 1993
- Peter Buchanan 1993 to 2005
- David Griffin 2005 to 2014
- Stuart Wetson 2014 to 2018
- Peter Wallace 2018 (acting)
- Mike Gunston 2018 to present

== Notable former pupils ==
- Jacqui Smith, Baroness Smith of Malvern, former Home Secretary (2007–09)Minister of State for Skills since 2024.
- Cher Lloyd, singer-songwriter, 4th place on the 7th series of The X Factor in 2010
- Rosie Spaughton, YouTuber
- Ian Bartlett, horse-racing expert and commentator
- Alexander M S Green, Chamber President of the First Tier Tribunal (General Regulatory Chamber) for Scotland, judge of the Employment Tribunal, judge of the First Tier Tribunal (Immigration and Asylum Chamber)

== Other Malvern area secondary schools ==
- Hanley Castle High School
- The Chase
