= Royal Grammar School Worcester =

School in Worcestershire, England

Location
- Upper Tything; Worcester, Worcestershire, WR1 1HP; England; 52.2004°N 2.2242°W

Information
- Other names: RGS Worcester; RGSW; RGSAO (2007–2009)
- Type: Private day school Public school
- Motto: Latin: Respice et Prospice (Remember the Past and Look to the Future)
- Established: 1291; 735 years ago
- Founder: Bishop Bosel
- Department for Education URN: 117038 Tables
- Headmaster: John Pitt
- Gender: Mixed
- Age range: 11–18
- Enrolment: 1,272 (Across all of the family of schools in 2019)
- Capacity: 2,182
- Houses: Whiteladies; Elgar; Ottley; Wylde
- Colours: Green, blue, white
- Alumni: Worcester Old Elizabethans
- Website: www.rgsw.org.uk

The Royal Grammar School Worcester (also known as RGS Worcester and RGSW) is an 11-18 co-educational, private day school and sixth form in Worcester, Worcestershire, England. Founded before 1291, and possibly as early as 685, it is one of the oldest British independent day schools.

In September 2007, the school merged with the neighbouring Alice Ottley School and was briefly known as RGS Worcester and The Alice Ottley School (RGSAO) before reverting to the original name. The school began accepting girls in 2003, prior to the merger. The school currently consists of the main secondary school and three preparatory campuses known as RGS Springfield (previously a boarding house of the Alice Ottley School), RGS The Grange (opened 1996), and RGS Dodderhill.

Until 1992 it accepted boarders. Boarding pupils would reside in Whiteladies House, a building that is rumoured to contain hidden treasure from Charles I from when he sought refuge there during the Civil War. It is now a day school and in 2024 was named the top co-ed independent school in the West Midlands.

Tracing its origins back to the 7th century, it is the sixth oldest school in the world.

== History ==
The school was founded as a secular monastic school in Worcester in around 685 by Bishop Bosel. This makes it the 6th oldest school in the world. It was located outside the monastic precincts (as with the King's School, Canterbury) and catered for the relatives of monks and children intending to go into the monastery. The first written reference to the school appears in 1265 when the Bishop of Worcester, Walter de Cantilupe, sent four chaplains into the city to teach.

Conclusive evidence appears in 1291 when an argument was settled by Bishop Godfrey Giffard regarding who owned the wax from the candles used at the feast of St Swithun. It was decided that the scholars of the Worcester School owned it, and the Rector of Saint Nicholas Church had to rely on the generosity of the scholars in order to get candle wax. The headmaster is mentioned as Stephen of London. The letter dated December 1291 is in the County Records Office in Worcester.

The next headmaster was appointed in 1312 as Hugh of Northampton as recorded in the Bishop's register for that year. He was appointed personally by the Bishop of Worcester, Archbishop of Canterbury, Lord Chancellor Walter Reynolds. The school continued to exist under the control of the city guilds through the centuries with various records of headmasters being appointed, again listed in the registers of the bishops of Worcester. One in particular was 'Sir Richard (Chaplain)', who was dismissed by the bishop of Worcester, Philip Morgan, in 1422 for taking money from the scholars for his own use. He was replaced the same year by Sir John Bredel. Sir Richard Pennington was appointed in 1485 and is known to have given money to the Archbishop of Canterbury's fund, showing the strong connection of the school with the church.

=== Royal charters ===
After a petition by some notable citizens of Worcester to endow the school permanently, the school was given a Royal Charter by Queen Elizabeth I in 1561 and a governing body known as the Six Masters was set up, which remains as the governing body of the new RGS Worcester school today. Amongst famous Six masters are John Wall, Earl Beauchamp, Charles William Dyson Perrins and Anthony Lechemere.

The Six Masters acquired much land for the school including its current site bought in 1562, the Pitchcroft fields, now used as the city racecourse, and land in Herefordshire still owned by the school. The 1906 Charity Commission survey also recorded a number of pubs in Worcester which still exist today.

A second Royal Charter was granted in 1843 by Queen Victoria, and the title of 'Royal' was conferred in 1869.

== Houses ==
The house system was introduced in 1899 by the then headmaster Frederick Arthur Hillard. Initially six houses were established, and membership of houses was based on the place of residence of each boy. The original houses were: Boarders, Barbourne, City, St. John's, County A, and County B. In 1909 the house system was changed to reflect the increasing number of boys in the school, and the difficulty of allocating pupils on the basis of where they lived. The six houses created in 1909 were: School House, for boarders, (which, due to common usage, changed to Whiteladies, as this was the building in which the boarders lived); Temple (after Henry Temple, headmaster 1850s); Tudor (after Elizabeth I); Woolfe (after Richard Woolfe, benefactor 1877 ); Wylde (after Thomas Wylde, benefactor 1558); and Yewle (after Robert Yewle, Six Master 1561). In 1963 two additional houses were created by the then headmaster Godfrey Brown, namely Langley (after William Langley, Six Master 1561) and Moore (after John Moore, benefactor 1626).

In 2013/ 2014, the house system changed from six houses (Flagge-red for Flagge Meadow, Butler-yellow for the old Butler Library, Cobham-gold for Cobham Hall, Eld-green for Eld Hall, Perrins-orange for Perrins Hall and Britannia-blue for Britannia house) to the current house system.

The current houses are:

House	Colour
Whiteladies	
Elgar	
Ottley	
Wylde	

The school holds a yearly house championship, decided by a range of events throughout the school year in which all four houses compete, with the winners of each event being awarded four points, the second-placed house three, down to the losing house one point. The house championship was traditionally called the 'Cock House' (or Cock House Cup Competition) competition, its name deriving from that of the Cock. The original cup that was competed for is one which was presented to the school in 1902 by the Old Elizabethans' Association; in modern times competition is for a cup which was introduced in 1978.

== Affiliated schools ==
=== RGS The Grange ===
RGS The Grange

Information
- Type: Private coeducational primary
- Motto: From tiny acorns to great oaks
- Established: 1996
- Headmaster: Gareth Hughes
- Gender: Mixed
- Age range: Nursery to Year 6
- Colour: Green
- Website: www.rgsw.org.uk/the-grange

RGS The Grange (Royal Grammar School The Grange) is located in Claines, north of Worcester, United Kingdom. It is approximately three miles (4.8 km) north of the senior school, and is situated on a 50 acres (20 ha) site.

The headmaster of the school since 2009 has been Gareth Hughes.

The school was founded in 1996, when RGS Worcester purchased a traditional English farmhouse in Claines named “The Grange”. It opened to just twenty pupils at the time, but soon other parts of the RGS prep school moved from the senior school site to the Grange. By early 2004, all of the prep school was located at the Grange.

Facilities at the school were upgraded in the early 2000s with a £4.5 million development of the buildings. The build was completed ahead of schedule.

The Grange has wide-ranging sporting facilities, set in 50 acres (200,000 m^{2}) of maintained pitches and playing fields. It also has an astroturf pitch for hockey.

The school has four houses: Cash (green), Perowne (yellow), Cornwall (red), and Goodrich (blue).

During 2008 the school formed linkages with the community departments of Worcester Warriors Rugby Club and Aston Villa Football Club.

=== RGS Springfield ===
RGS Springfield

Information
- Type: Private coeducational primary
- Motto: The Secret in the Square
- Established: 1953
- Headmistress: Laura Brown
- Gender: Mixed
- Age range: Nursery to Year 6
- Colour: Blue
- Website: www.rgsw.org.uk/springfield

RGS Springfield (Royal Grammar School Springfield) is located in Britannia Square in Worcester, United Kingdom. It is located 100 yards west of the Senior School.

After the RGS/AO merger, RGS Springfield became mixed-sex.

The headmistress of the school is Mrs Laura Brown.

Prior to September 2009, the school was known as AO Springfield, as it was the AO's junior school prior to the RGS/AO merger. Today, the school houses 150 pupils.

RGS Springfield is located in a large Georgian house surrounded by six acres of gardens and playing fields. The school has a forest area where the children can learn about nature.

Academic and music scholarships are offered at RGS Springfield.

==== Academic scholarships ====
These are offered to people entering year five and year six. There is no separate exam; pupils who perform very well in the entrance exam are offered scholarships.

===== Music scholarships =====
These are also offered to people entering year three and year five. As a guide, pupils taking a music scholarship exam in Year three are expected to hold Grade one on one musical instrument. Year five pupils taking the exam are expected to be playing two or more instruments and have achieved grade three in at least one of their grades.

=== RGS Dodderhill ===
RGS Dodderhill

Information
- Type: Private coeducational primary
- Motto: Educating children for future success
- Established: 1945
- Headmistress: Sarah Atkinson
- Gender: Mixed
- Age range: Nursery to Year 11
- Colour: Yellow
- Website: www.rgsw.org.uk/dodderhill

RGS Dodderhill (Royal Grammar School Dodderhill) is located in the town of Droitwich Spa, Worcestershire, approximately six miles outside of Worcester.

Previously Dodderhill Independent Girls School, the school merged with RGS Worcester family of schools in 2019 and became known as RGS Dodderhill.

In September 2021, RGS Dodderhill Prep School became co-educational while the Senior School remains for girls only.

The headmistress of the school is Mrs Sarah Atkinson who was appointed in 2019 following the retirement of Mrs Cate Mawston.

RGS Dodderhill has a large indoor sports hall, outdoor netball and tennis courts, as well as purpose-built drama and music studios.

== Connections ==
The school is a member of the 'Monmouth Group', a collection of schools similar in aims and membership to that of the Eton Group. The school is also a member of the HMC.

== Land and buildings ==
Many of the current buildings were paid for Charles William Dyson Perrins, who was an Old Boy and a member of the school's governing body. Perrins Hall was named after his father James Dyson Perrins, owner of Lea and Perrins Worcestershire Sauce, who went to the school.

The basement of Perrins Hall contains a rifle range, which was added in 1914. The back rooms of Perrins Hall used to be the sixth-form common rooms and are now used for storage.

=== Flagge Meadow ===
Flagge Meadow is located nearby at the back of the school, next to the Worcester and Birmingham Canal. Flagge Meadow (pronounced Flag) was first levelled and used for cricket in 1886. The first recorded match to be held there was in 1939, when the school played Merton College, Oxford. The ground has also played host to several Second XI fixtures for the Worcestershire Second XI in the Second XI Championship and Second XI Trophy. In 2007, the ground held a single List-A match for Worcestershire when they played Sri Lanka A. Each year in the summer term cricket is played at Flagge Meadow.

=== Other land ===
St. Oswald's, the school's second playing field, is located further down the canal and is mainly used for athletics, football and rounders.

== School's halls ==
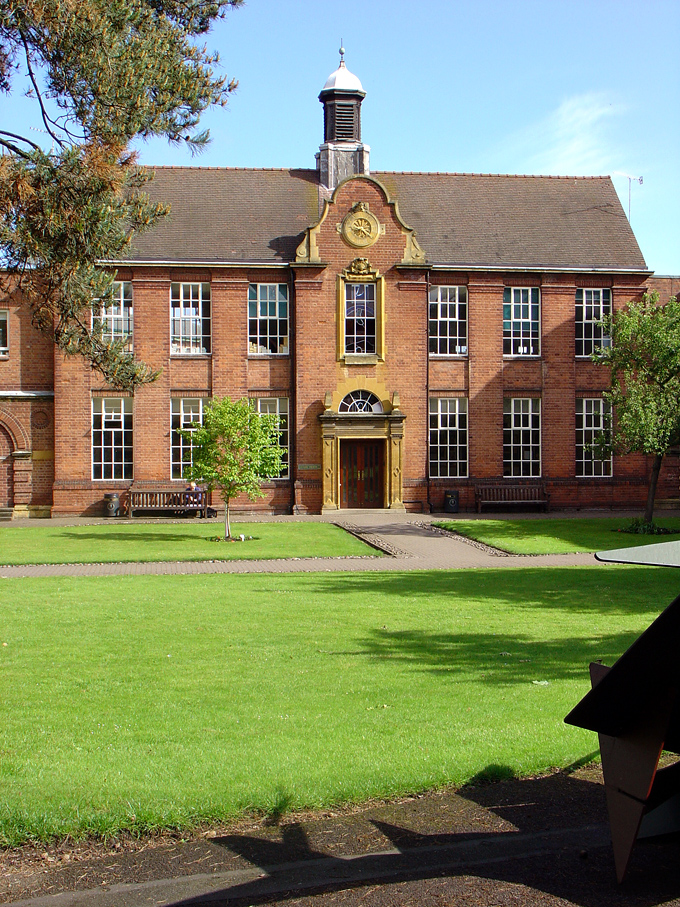
Front of the Clock Block.

The Old School buildings were built in 1868 on a site owned by the school since 1562. The Main Hall, Eld Hall and adjoining buildings were designed by A E Perkins in the Gothic style. It is three bays long with a central lantern. A life-size statue of Elizabeth I by R L Boulton stands above the central window.

The Perrins Hall was built in 1914 to the plans of Alfred Hill Parker (an Old Boy) in a Jacobethan style with an Oriel Window on the staircase end and balcony looking over the hall. The interior is panelled with fitted bookcases (which make up the Dowty Library) and a plastered ceiling. Two war memorials for the two World Wars are housed in the hall and a life-size portrait of Charles William Dyson Perrins hangs opposite the fireplace. Portraits of the 20th-century headmasters hang below. The school organ is in this building, and is played regularly at assemblies.

The Clock Block is connected to the Perrins Hall and was built in 1927, and had extension work carried out in 1967 to link it to the Science Block. It has a bell tower and clock above the entrance. The clock (which was installed by J. B. Joyce & Co) is made of Cotswold Limestone, and is surmounted by the carved head of Old Father Time. To commemorate the millennium a stained glass window was commissioned and installed over the main entrance to the Clock Block.

In the Alice Ottley Building, formerly the main school building for the Alice Ottley School, there are two more halls: Cobham Hall and Main Hall. Main Hall is the school's dining hall, with views over a lawn and a stained glass window commemorating Miss Margaret Spurling, headmistress of the Alice Ottley School from 1912 to 1934.

=== Other buildings ===
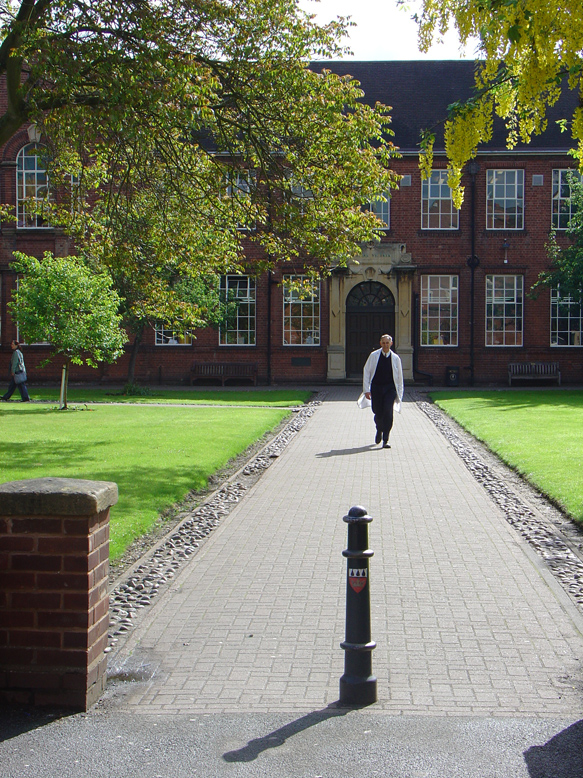
Long walk with the science block in the distance. The small school crest in the foreground features the three Black Pears.

The science buildings were built in 1922 and opened by the Duke and Duchess of York (later King George VI and Queen Elizabeth). The science buildings were subsequently refurbished in 1996 and thereafter re-opened by Michael Portillo. The science block features at one end of a long path which comes from the main quad of the school, which is the location of Perrins Hall and the Main block. This long path is known as Long Walk.

Whiteladies House, built in the 17th century, was traditionally the Headmaster's house and stands opposite Clock Block across the gardens. This is currently where the school admin staff, nurse, and school heads of departments are situated. The West wall was part of the Whiteladies Priory Chapel built in 1255. Its name derives from the white habit that is worn by Cistercian nuns, who were based at a Nunnery, which was adjacent to Whiteladies.

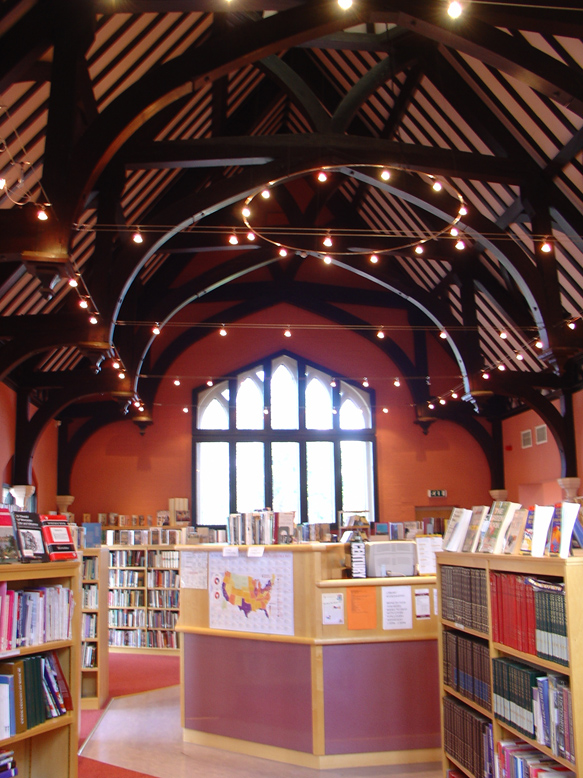
The school's library, with the old roof structure visible

Other buildings include Priory House (17th Century), Pullinger House (1980s), Gordon House (after Adam Lindsay Gordon OE), Stephen Hall (1961, opened by Queen Elizabeth the Queen Mother on her second visit to the school) and the Design Centre comprising various engineering facilities.

The most recent building work to a school building took place on the school's Performing Arts Centre. The Performing Arts Centre (formerly a gymnasium), was extended to create three spaces: Studio 1 downstairs, Studio 2 upstairs, and the Godfrey Brown Theatre. An entrance was added to the back of the building and a car park was opened. This project cost the school £2.8 million.

The school's library was refurbished in 2001, and was renamed the Philip Sawyer Library (after the former chairman of the governors). It was opened by the then Poet Laureate Andrew Motion. The library is situated above Eld Hall, and features a high vaulted roof structure.

== Sport ==
=== Rowing ===
The school has a rowing club, the Royal Grammar School Worcester Boat Club, which is based on the River Severn. The club is affiliated to British Rowing (boat code WRG) and has produced British champion crews at the British Rowing Championships in 1997, 2000, 2001, 2002 and 2003.

=== Other Sports ===
The school offers Rugby union and football to boys and hockey and netball to girls. The school stopped teaching lacrosse in 2010.

Both boys and girls are taught tennis, athletics, swimming and, after a six-year campaign by a former pupil, cricket is now taught to girls as well as boys.

== Notable patrons ==
- Bishop Godfrey Giffard (1240–1306) Bishop of Worcester and Lord Chancellor of England.
- Bishop Walter Reynolds (d.1327) Archbishop of Canterbury and Lord Chancellor of England.
- Hugh Latimer (1470–1555) Bishop of Worcester and Protestant Martyr.
- C.W. Dyson Perrins Chairman Royal Worcester Porcelain and collector.
- Queen Elizabeth I
- Queen Victoria
- Godfrey Brown Headmaster 1950–78, Olympic Gold Medallist.

== Notable alumni ==
Famous Old Boys of the school or Worcester Old Elizabethans (more complete list here), include (in alphabetical order)

- John Mark Ainsley (born 1963) Tenor
- Sir Roy Allen (R.G.D. Allen) (1906–1983) Economist
- Jonny Arr (born 1988), rugby union player
- John Billingham (1930–2013) former director of the SETI Program Office and director of the Life Sciences Division at the NASA Ames Research Center
- E. J. Bowen FRS (1898–1980) Physical chemist and geologist
- Dom Augustine Bradshaw (1574–1618) Catholic missionary
- Sir Reginald Bray KG (d.1503) Statesman and Architect
- Tim Curtis (born 1960) Cricketer, former captain of Worcestershire.
- Sir George Dowty – aeronautical engineer, industrialist and philanthropist.
- Tom Dyckhoff (born 1971) Architecture critic and TV Presenter
- John Francis Lane (1928–2018) Actor, journalist and critic
- Adam Lindsay Gordon (1833–1870) National Poet of Australia
- Dean Headley (born 1970) former England international cricketer
- Imran Khan (born 1952), 22nd prime minister of Pakistan, politician, cricketer and philanthropist
- John McKenna (born 1964), Royal Society of British Sculptors
- William Langland (1330–1387)
- Benjamin Williams Leader RA (1831–1923) Artist
- William Laslett (1799-1884) Member of Parliament
- Sir Thomas Littleton (1407–1481) Lawyer
- Jurek Martin (born 1942) Financial Times Foreign Correspondent and former Foreign Editor
- Liam O'Driscoll (born 1987), cricketer
- Neil Pinner (born 1990), cricketer
- Graham Robb (born 1958) Author
- T J Cobden Sanderson (1840–1922) Arts and Crafts movement pioneer
- Philip Serrell TV Auctioneer.
- Ollie Steele (born 1993), cricketer
- John Trapp (1601–1669) English Anglican Bible commentator
- Ben Warren (born 1879) footballer for England
- Professor Michael Wilding (born 1942) Australian author
- Sir Edward Leader Williams (1828–1910) civil engineer (Manchester Ship Canal)

== Notable teachers ==
Teachers who have served 25 years at the school are celebrated on the name board, installed during the 1980s, in the Philip Sawyer Library.

Teacher	Start date	End date	Length of service
R.J Carter	1900	1942	42 years
W.A.H Chessall	1910	1946	36 years
Miss D.A Hussey	1916	1949	33 years
W. Stratford	1920	1958	38 years
E.F James	1921	1953	32 years
F.V Follett	1921	1950	29 years
G. Ward	1921	1957	36 years
S.J.H Balchin	1922	1960	38 years
J.F.T Hills	1923	1963	40 years
J.M Young	1924	1967	43 years
A.T Shaw	1925	1962	37 years
E. Billingham	1926	1962	36 years
F.C Holland	1926	1966	40 years
R.D Wormald	1927	1961	34 years
A.S Stockdale	1927	1966	39 years
J.C Giblin	1928	1961	33 years
T.R.C Protheroe	1931	1971	40 years
W.G Wright	1936	1969	33 years
R.D Allen	1939	1979	40 years
W.F Wheeler	1942	1975	33 years
E.Orton	1947	1979	32 years
A.R Wheeler	1950	1987	37 years
A.T Chester	1950	1980	30 years
D.C Hooker	1952	1979	27 years
S.N Robertson	1952	1987	35 years
B.Hunt	1960	1996	36 years
A.J Bennett	1961	1994	33 years
W. Reed	1967	1997	30 years
B.M Rees	1967	2001	34 years
J.E Fretwell	1968	1993	25 years
I.C Matthew	1970	1995	25 years
H.M Fincher	1972	1997	25 years
R.L Blackbourn	1974	2005	31 years
N.R Humphries	1975	2000	25 years
A.R Millington	1975	2011	36 years
R.H Savage	1976	2008	32 years
E.A Dovey	1976	2011	35 years
M.J Ridout	1978	2014	36 years
D.J Cotterill	1979	2016	37 years
J.G Wilderspin	1980	2011	31 years
R.J Micheal	1980	2012	32 years
M.D Wilkinson	1980	2018	38 years
J.M Shorrocks	1981	2018	37 years
J.H Croasdell	1982	2007	25 years
H. Groves	1982	2011	29 years
E.J Howill	1983	2009	26 years
J.N Waller	1983	2013	30 years
T.S Curtis	1983	2016	33 years
M.D Ralfe	1984	2018	34 years
S.J Richards	1984	2014	30 years
S.D Howells	1985	2012	27 years
M.H Vetch	1986	2016	30 years
L.S Kettle	1986	2022	36 years
L.F Taylor	1987	2012	25 years
P.J O'Sullivan	1988	2016	28 years
J.E Marsh	1989	2021	32 years
R.T Gibson	1994	2022	28 years

== See also ==
- List of the oldest schools in the United Kingdom
- List of English and Welsh endowed schools (19th century)
