= Charles William Dyson Perrins =

English businessman, bibliophile, and philanthropist (1864–1958)

Charles William Dyson Perrins FRAS
- Charles William Dyson Perrins by Ernest Waldron West, c.1958
- Born: 25 May 1864; Claines, Worcestershire, England
- Died: 29 January 1958 (aged 93); Malvern, Worcestershire, England
- Burial place: Municipal cemetery, Great Malvern
- Occupations: Businessman, bibliophile and philanthropist
- Years active: 1887–1958
- Known for: A director of Royal Worcester Porcelain Factory; major benefactor of the Royal Grammar School Worcester; funded the building of the Dyson Perrins Laboratory
- Spouse: Florence Winifred Midwood (Frieda) Milne

Charles William Dyson Perrins (25 May 1864 – 29 January 1958) was an English businessman, bibliophile, and philanthropist. He was born in Claines, near Worcester, the son of James Dyson Perrins, the owner of the Lea & Perrins Worcestershire sauce factory and the grandson of William Perrins, co-originator of the Lea & Perrins secret recipe.

== Biography ==
He was educated at Charterhouse School and The Queen's College, Oxford, and then served in the Highland Light Infantry. After the death of his father, he took over management of Lea & Perrins. His father had also been a director of Royal Worcester Porcelain Factory and Charles followed him, becoming a director in 1891. He became chairman in 1901 and supported the factory financially. He bought the company outright in 1934 and ensured its continuity from his own fortune until it could be taken public in 1954.

In 1927, he purchased the Royal Worcester Porcelain Factory's historic ceramics collection for a price above market value to assist the firm's cashflow. In 1946, he established the Perrins Trust to unite the factory museum collection and his own private holdings of Royal Worcester and ensure their survival. After his death, his widow established the "Dyson Perrins Museum" at the factory site to house the collection. It is now called "The Museum of Royal Worcester" (previously "Worcester Porcelain Museum").

Perrins lived in Malvern for most of his life, and amongst his many charitable deeds in Worcestershire was the endowment of Dyson Perrins Church of England Academy in Malvern. He served as Mayor of Worcester for 1897–98 and as High Sheriff of Worcestershire for 1899–1900.

He was a major benefactor of the Royal Grammar School, Worcester and endowed new buildings including Perrins Hall (1914) named after his father, an old boy. The school organ is in this building and is played regularly at assemblies. He became a Six Master and chairman of the governors of that school until the 1950s. His portrait by A. Hacker (1907) hangs in the hall.

In Oxford, he funded the building of the Dyson Perrins Laboratory, which was the main centre for research into organic chemistry at Oxford University from its foundation in 1916 until its retirement as a laboratory in 2003. He received an honorary DCL from Oxford University.

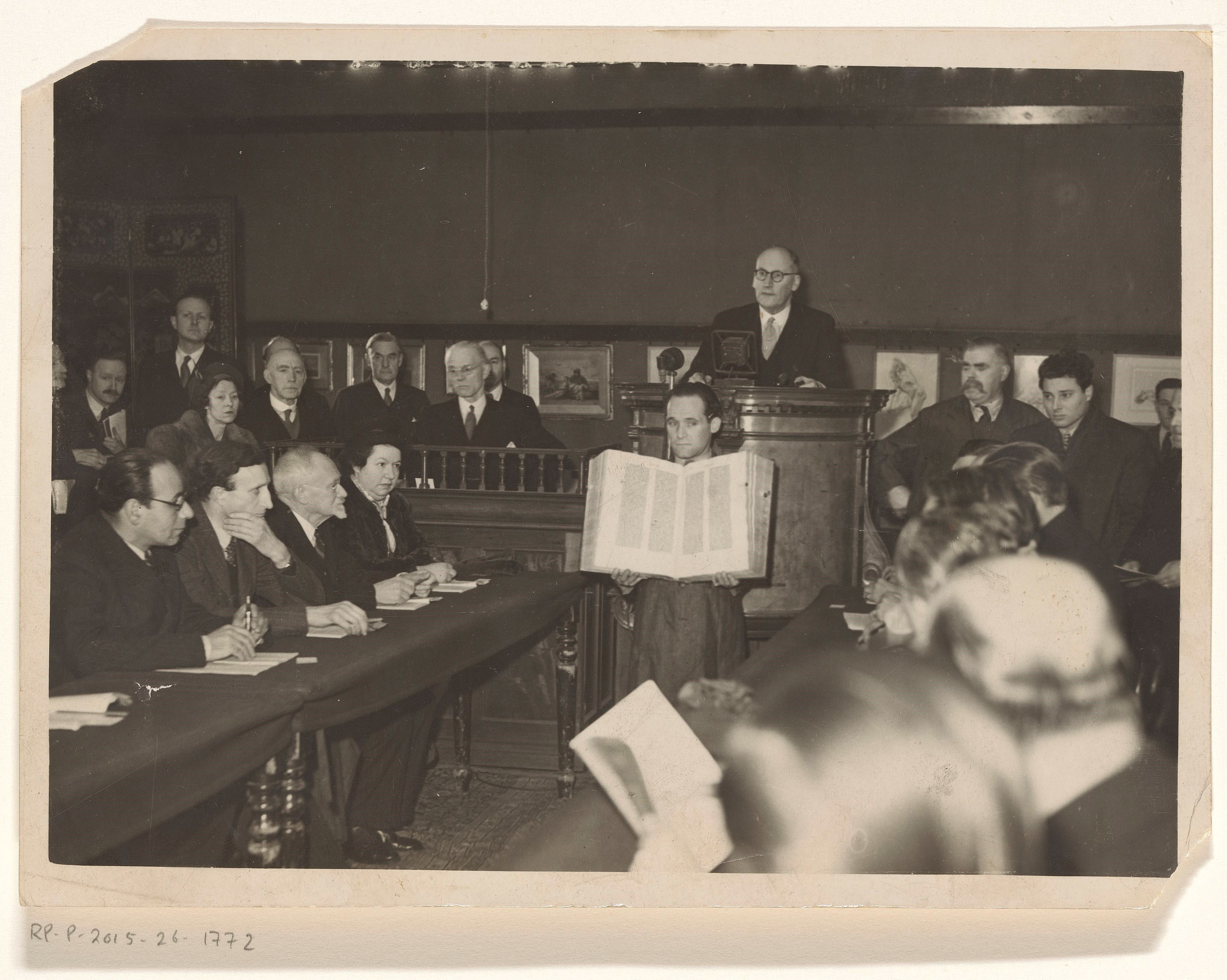
Auction of Perrins's Gutenberg Bible 1947 at Sotheby's

During Perrins's life, he amassed one of the most important book collections in the world, particularly strong in medieval illuminated manuscripts and printed ballads. To help finance and re-establish the Royal Worcester factory after World War II, he decided to sell his important collection of early printed books, and they were mostly dispersed in a series of sales at Sotheby's in London in 1946 and 1947. His illuminated manuscripts and other remaining printed books were sold after his death in three major auction sales in 1958 to 1960. A record total for a single collection of £1,100,000 was raised by these sales. Items once owned by C. W. Dyson Perrins now form the basis of many other prominent collections, such as the Lessing J. Rosenwald Collection now in the Library of Congress.

Many other items from his collection were given or bequeathed by him to public institutions such as the Victoria and Albert Museum, the National Gallery, the Ashmolean Museum, Winchester Cathedral library, and the British Museum. For example, his Mughal manuscript the Emperor Akbar's Khamsa of Nizami is now in the British Library and Palestrina by J. M. W. Turner is in the National Gallery.

== Family ==
Perrins married:

1. Catherine Christina Gregory at St Giles' Cathedral, Edinburgh in October 1889. They had five children. Catherine died at Davenham, the family home, on 31 January 1922, and was buried at the Municipal cemetery, Great Malvern.
2. Florence Winifred Midwood Milne (known as Frieda) at St John, Chelsea on 6 September 1923. She died on 28 December 1968.

Charles William Dyson Perrins died at Davenham on 29 January 1958, and was buried at Great Malvern.

== Sources ==
- "Perrins, William Henry". Oxford Dictionary of National Biography (online ed.). Oxford University Press. doi:10.1093/ref:odnb/39633. (Subscription, Wikipedia Library access or UK public library membership required.)
