= Edward Rowlands (cricketer) =

Australian cricketer

Personal information
- Born: c. 1826; Claines, Worcestershire, England
- Died: 1860 (aged 33–34)

Domestic team information
- Years: Team
- 1854: Victoria
- Source: Cricinfo, 30 January 2015

Edward Rowlands (c. 1826 – 1860) was an Australian cricketer. He played one first-class cricket match for Victoria in 1854.

== See also ==
- List of Victoria first-class cricketers
