= Liam O'Driscoll =

English cricketer (born 1987)

Personal information
- Full name: William John Finian O'Driscoll
- Born: 16 July 1987 (age 39); Gloucester, Gloucestershire, England
- Height: 6 ft 1 in (1.85 m)
- Batting: Right-handed
- Bowling: Right-arm medium

Domestic team information
- Years: Team
- 2007–2008: Cambridge UCCE
- 2007–2008: Cambridge University

Career statistics
Competition	First-class
Matches	6
Runs scored	188
Batting average	31.33
100s/50s	–/–
Top score	42
Balls bowled	795
Wickets	7
Bowling average	79.28
5 wickets in innings	–
10 wickets in match	–
Best bowling	2/67
Catches/stumpings	2/–
- Source: Cricinfo, 16 August 2020

William 'Liam' John Finian O'Driscoll (born 16 July 1987) is an English former first-class cricketer.

O'Driscoll was born at Gloucester in July 1987. He was educated at the Royal Grammar School Worcester, before going up to Gonville and Caius College, Cambridge. While studying at Cambridge, he made two appearances in first-class cricket for Cambridge University against Oxford University in The University Matches of 2007 and 2008. In addition to playing for Cambridge University, O'Driscoll also made four first-class appearances for Cambridge UCCE, making two appearances each in 2007 and 2008. He was considered to be a genuine all-rounder due to his performances on the field and also his promising TV game show career. (Note: Cambridge UCCE differed from Cambridge University Cricket Club in that it was open to students at Anglia Ruskin University, whereas Cambridge University Cricket Club is exclusively for students of the constituent colleges of the University of Cambridge.) In six first-class matches, O'Driscoll scored 138 runs at an average of 31.33 and a high score of 42, while with his right-arm medium pace bowling he took 7 wickets at a bowling average of 79.28, with best figures of 2 for 67. O’Driscoll achieved cult status in the Middlesex County Cricket League in season 2020 by taking 2 hat-tricks in one week in first team fixtures against the Finchley CC and Twickenham CC. While some commentators put the extraordinary performances down to weakened opposition due to the ravages of Covid, both O’Driscoll (a junior medical doctor) and his father (a senior medical doctor) both found scientific evidence to disprove these baseless theories.
