= Alexander M. S. Green =

Scottish lawyer

Alexander M S Green M.Theol (Hons), LL.B, LL.M, M.Litt., MStJ FSA Scot is a Tribunal judge and the Procurator Fiscal to the Court of the Lord Lyon. He was appointed to this position in July 2010.

He was admitted as a Freeman to the Worshipful Company of Scriveners in July 2014 and a Liveryman in July 2015. He is a Burgess and Free Guild Member of the Burgh of Aberdeen. He is a Fellow of the Society of Antiquaries of Scotland. He was granted the Freedom of the City of London in January 2015 by virtue of being a Liveryman. He is a Member of the Most Venerable Order of the Hospital of St John of Jerusalem.

== Education ==
He attended Dyson Perrins Church of England Academy (formerly Dyson Perrins C.E. High School). He is a graduate of the University of St Andrews holding degrees in Theology and Scottish History and the University of Aberdeen, holding degrees in Scots law and Public International Law.

== Legal career ==
He was a partner at CMS Cameron McKenna before establishing his own practice. He is a solicitor admitted to practice in England & Wales and also in Scotland. He is a Notary Public in Scotland.

He is the President of the First Tier Tribunal (General Regulatory Chamber) for Scotland. He sits as a judge in the Employment Tribunal and the First Tier Immigration and Asylum Chamber.

== Heraldry and football Clubs ==
Since his appointment as Procurator Fiscal to the Lyon Court, he has occasionally had to deal with Scottish football clubs using heraldic badges, which has excited a considerable amount of debate as to the role of the Law of Arms in modern Scotland

== Arms ==
Coat of arms of Alexander Green
Adopted 2004 Crest A squirrel sejant holding in its paws a pear proper. Escutcheon Vert, on a fess Argent between in dexter chief a balance Or and a Sword Argent hilted and pommelled Or in saltire, sinister chief a harp Or stringed Argent and in base a triple tower Argent, a sprig of juniper proper. Motto SERVO VERITATEM ("I serve the truth") Symbolism The choice of Green is a canting of his name. The tower relates to connections with Aberdeen and service as a burgess of the city. The sword and scales of justice relate to his profession as a solicitor and notary public. The sprig of juniper represents his connection the Ross family. The chief of Clan Ross wears juniper in his bonnet. The harp refers to harmony and lyricism. The squirrel is a symbol of industry. The squirrel holds a pear in his paws and refer to the fact that Green was born in the city of Worcester. The coat of arms of the city of Worcester includes three black pears. The motto is "I serve the truth" also relates to his profession.
