= The Mug House =

Pub in Claines, Worcestershire

Coordinates: 52.227721°N 2.218927°W

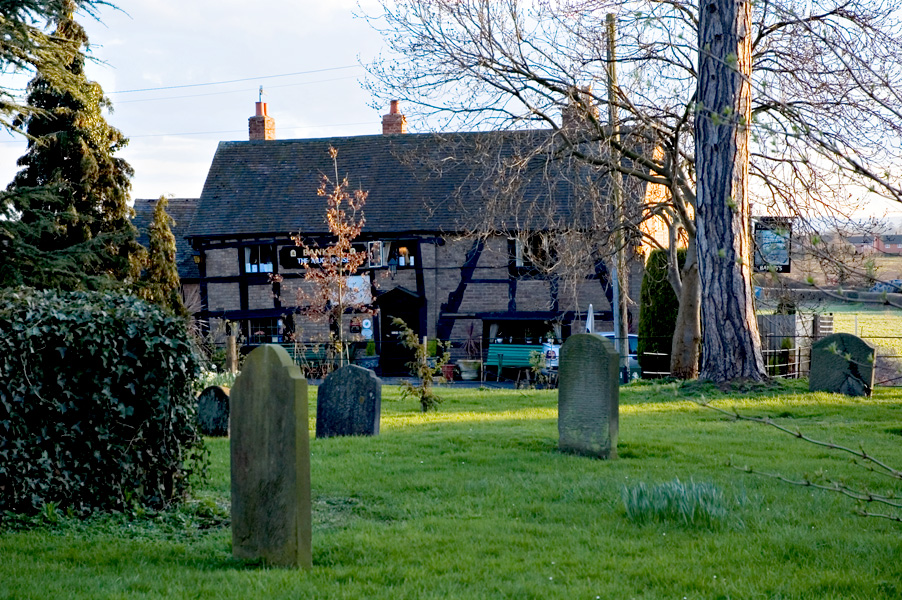
The view of the Mug House from the churchyard of Claines church.

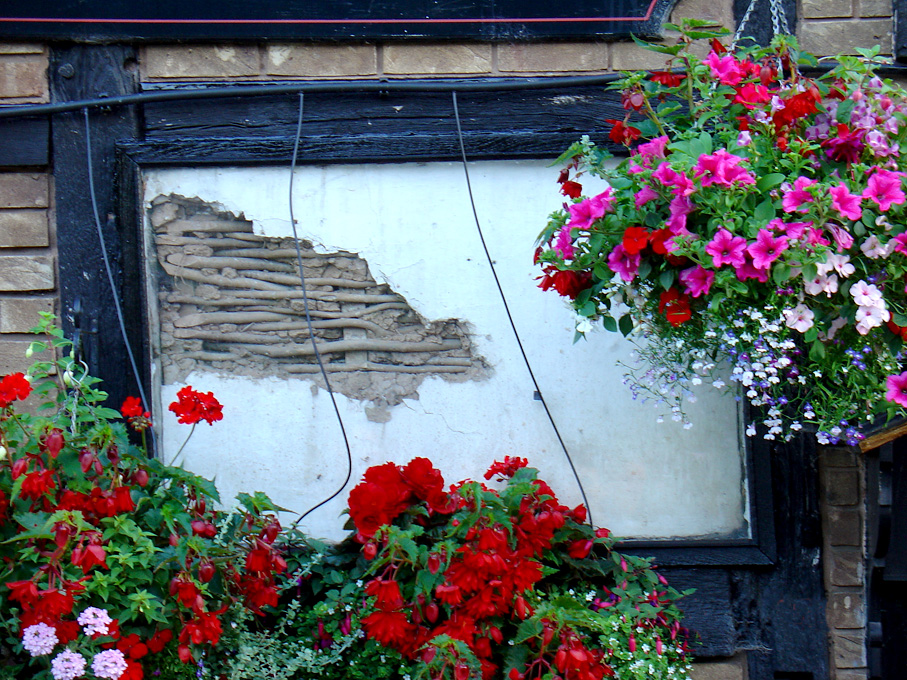
An original wattle and daub panel at the Mug House.

The Mug House is a traditional public house located in the village of Claines, Worcestershire, England, which dates back to the 15th century.

== Overview ==
The Mug House pub is owned by Wolverhampton & Dudley Breweries and offers several Banks's bitters along with one or two other guest ales which rotate every few weeks. The owners have chosen to maintain a traditional atmosphere by not introducing games machines or music to the pub.

The Mug House has featured in the local news several times over the last few years due to stories that the pub is in some way haunted. The past few landlords have all claimed that there are regularly strange occurrences at the pub such as glasses smashing or dull knocking noises coming from the beer cellar at night. This has only increased the popularity of the pub.

== Location ==
The Mug House is situated in the village of Claines, about three miles north of the city of Worcester. The exact location of the pub is near the junction where Claines Lane meets Cornmeadow Lane, just to the rear of Claines church. The situation of the pub is such that one has to walk through, or very near, the graveyard of the church in order to access it. The pub is one of only two pubs in England to be situated on consecrated ground.

== Interior ==
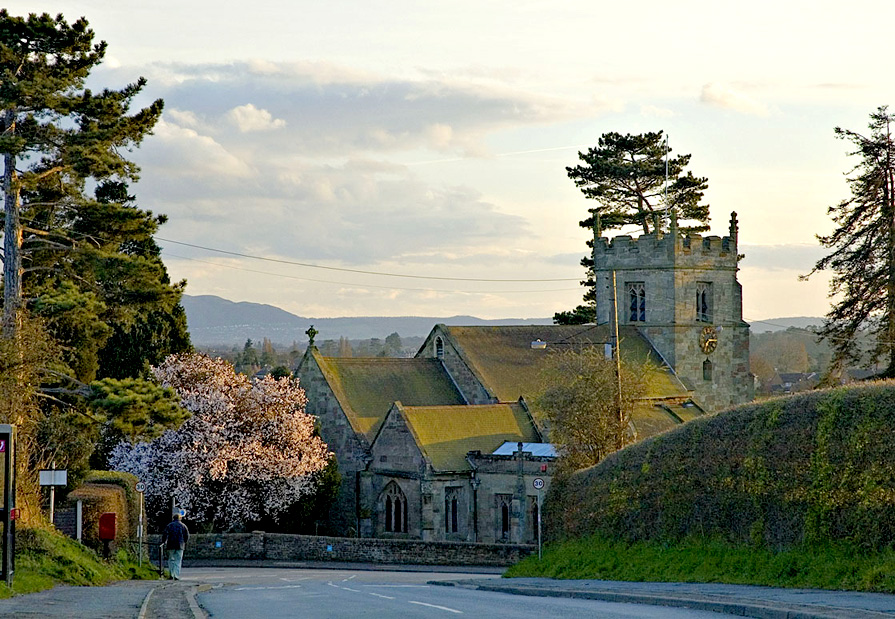
Claines Church behind which the Mug House is situated. The Malvern Hills are visible in the background.

The pub consists of four main public spaces inside on the ground floor. There is a back room, bar, hatch and a snug. The back room is most commonly used by diners at lunch time and from this room there is a view of the Malvern Hills. The hatch tends to be frequented when the other rooms are fully occupied. The ceilings inside the Mug House are quite low and as the building is timber framed many of the walls are not straight, because the building has settled over time. In order to access the toilets one must exit the main building because the toilets themselves are located in a separate outhouse. The building is timber framed but there is a cellar.

== Awards ==
The Mug House has won a Jubilee Heritage Award in a national competition to find Britain's prettiest pubs. Mounted by the Green Organisation, the competition was launched to commemorate Queen Elizabeth II's Golden Jubilee in 2002 and the role pubs and landlords play in safeguarding natural heritage. The garden, described as a stunning blaze of red, white and blue blooms by all that have enjoyed it, helped secure the award.
