= Neil Pinner =

English cricketer

Personal information
- Full name: Neil Douglas Pinner
- Born: 28 September 1990 (age 36); Wordsley, Worcestershire, England
- Batting: Right-handed
- Bowling: Right-arm off break

Domestic team information
- Years: Team
- 2011–2013: Worcestershire (squad no. 20)
- 2015: Leicestershire (squad no. 9)
- 2014–2017: Herefordshire

Career statistics
Competition	FC	LA	T20
Matches	19	18	2
Runs scored	762	235	–
Batting average	26.27	13.82	–
100s/50s	1/4	0/0	–
Top score	165*	37	–
Balls bowled	48	29	12
Wickets	0	0	0
Bowling average	–	–	–
5 wickets in innings	–	–	–
10 wickets in match	–	–	–
Best bowling	–	–	–
Catches/stumpings	22/–	3/–	0/–
- Source: CricketArchive, 6 June 2015

Neil Douglas Pinner (born 28 September 1990) is an English cricketer. Pinner is a right-handed batsman who bowls right-arm off break. He was born in Wordsley, Worcestershire and educated at the Royal Grammar School Worcester.

Having played for the Worcestershire Second XI since 2008, Pinner made his full debut for Worcestershire in a List A match against Middlesex in the 2011 Clydesdale Bank 40. He made eight further appearances in that competition, scoring a total of 122 runs at an average of 13.55, with a high score of 37. He also made a single first-class appearance in the 2011 County Championship against Nottinghamshire. He batted once in the match and was dismissed for a duck by Charlie Shreck.

At the end of the 2015 season, Leicestershire announced that they would not be renewing Pinner's contract.
