= Claines =

Village and suburb of Worcester in Worcestershire, England

Coordinates: 52.227899°N 2.218678°W

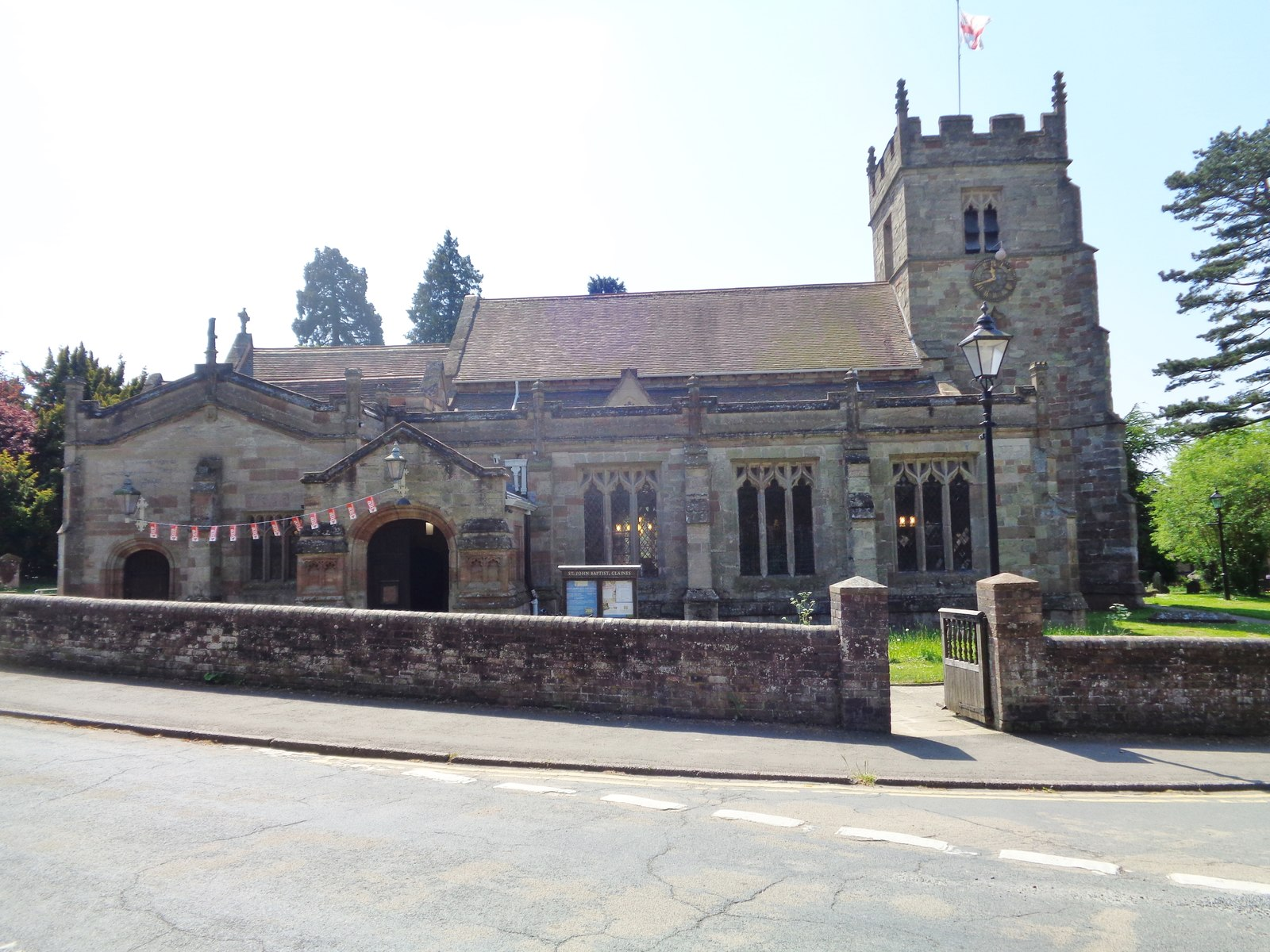
- St Johns the Baptist Church, Claines

- Location within Worcestershire
- Population: 8,219 2021 Census
  - London: 133 mi (214 km) SE
- District: Worcester
- Shire county: Worcestershire
- Region: West Midlands
- Country: England
- Sovereign state: United Kingdom
- Post town: Worcester
- Postcode district: WR3
- Dialling code: 01905
- Police: West Mercia
- Fire: Hereford and Worcester
- Ambulance: West Midlands
- UK Parliament: Worcester

Claines is a village to the north of Worcester, in the Worcester district, in the county of Worcestershire, England. It is located on the east bank of the River Severn. Claines is situated in the heart of Worcestershire on the A449 between Worcester and Kidderminster. It has a church which dates from the 10th Century. In 1881 the parish had a population of 10,212. On 30 September 1885 the parish was abolished and split to form North Claines and South Claines. It is now part of the unparished area of Worcester.

The Worcester suburb of Cornmeadow Green, which is adjacent to Claines is generally referred to as Claines, a result of when the area was once historically part of Claines Parish before Worcester expanded and various administrative boundary changes many years ago.

The name Claines derives from the Old English clǣgnæss meaning 'clay ness' (i.e promontory).

Claines is known for The Mug House, one of only two pubs in a churchyard in England.

Pineau De Re, the 2014 Grand National winner, was trained at Claines and is also stabled there. The Claines village name signs were replaced by Worcestershire County Council in 2014 to recognize the win and connection to the village.

== Notable people ==
- Richard Moon (1814–1899) Chairman of the London and North Western Railway from June 1861 until he retired on 22 February 1891. He lived in Bevere, a small hamlet on the banks of the River Severn, in Claines parish from 1849 to 1863. At the vestry meeting on 24 April 1851 he was elected as Vicar's Churchwarden.
- Charles William Dyson Perrins (1864–1958), businessman and grandson of William Henry Perrins, was born in Claines.
- William Henry Perrins (1793–1867), chemist and co-inventor of Worcestershire sauce, died in Claines and is buried in the churchyard of St John the Baptist.
- Cricketer Edward Rowlands (1826–1860) was born here.
