= Jurek Martin =

British journalist

Jurek Martin OBE (born 1942) is a British journalist. A Financial Times columnist and former foreign editor and twice Washington, D.C. bureau chief, Martin was noted for his weekly "Letter to America" column before becoming a columnist for FT.com and a contributor to the newspaper.

Martin's father was a Polish aviator in the 302 and 303 RAF Polish fighter squadrons, whilst his mother was an English nurse. Martin was born in England in 1942 and educated at the Royal Grammar School Worcester and Hertford College, Oxford. After three years teaching and writing in California, he joined the Financial Times in London before moving to the United States. He was the Tokyo bureau chief, 1982–86, and was awarded two British Press Awards for his coverage of Japan.

In 1997, he was awarded an OBE by the Queen. He has been a Woodrow Wilson Visiting Fellow at several US colleges, including Grinnell College in 2002.
