= Augustine Bradshaw =

Dom Augustine Bradshaw (1575–1618) was a Benedictine monk. Born John Bradshaw near Worcester in 1575 to recusant Roman Catholic parents, he was sent to Royal Grammar School Worcester (a "free school", i.e. with no religious affiliation). He was sent to St Omer by the Jesuit Edward Oldcorne and then, in 1596, to the English College, Valladolid.

After an illness, he was sent to the Abbey of San Martín Pinario in Santiago de Compostela in 1599 where he took the name Augustine of St John. He returned to England as a missionary in 1602, and became Vicar-General of the English Benedictines in 1604. He is recorded in contemporary writing as travelling the county of Worcestershire under the pseudonym John White.

Among his most remembered achievements was the establishment of a monastic foundation at Douai and the College of St Gregory (later Downside School). He was buried at Longueville near Rouen in 1618.
