= John Wheeley Lea =

English pharmacist and sauce manufacturer

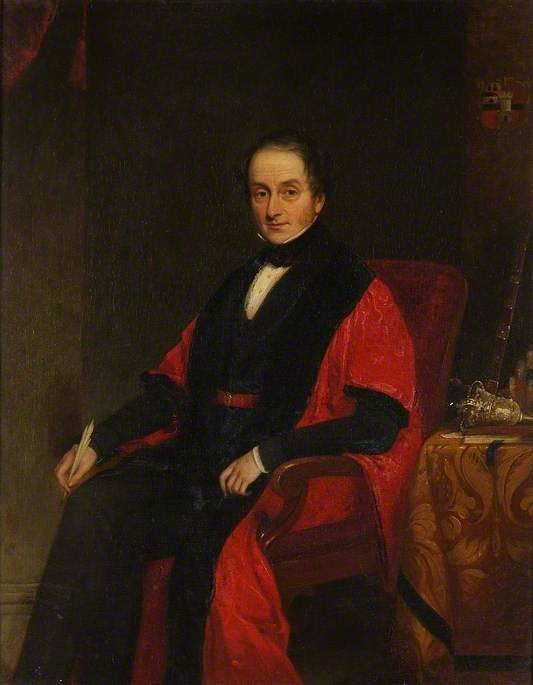
- Lea painted in 1850 during his time as mayor
- Born: 1792; Feckenham, Worcestershire, England
- Died: 23 March 1874 (aged 82); Worcester, Worcestershire, England
- Occupations: Pharmacist, manufacturer
- Known for: Company and co-founder of Lea & Perrins

Mayor of Worcester
- In office 1835–1835

Mayor of Worcester
- In office 1849–1850

John Wheeley Lea (1792 – March 23 1874) was an English chemist, mayor, and co-founder of Lea & Perrins. Along with William Henry Perrins, Lea invented Worcestershire sauce.

== Biography ==
Lea was born on a farm in Feckenham, Worcestershire, England.

In 1823, Lea and William Henry Perrins created the new condiment. After allowing it to mature for 18 months, they sampled it to find they enjoyed the flavor. They established their pharmacy Lea & Perrins and in 1837 began selling their brand of Worcestershire sauce. By 1846, the condiment was advertised alongside various coffees and lotions.

He was elected Mayor of Worcester in 1835, and served again from 1849 to 1850. Lea was also an alderman in 1864. He died of acute dyspepsia (a fatal stomach disorder where the stomach cannot function properly) on 23 March 1874 at Stanfield House, Upper Wick, Worcestershire, and was buried in the family tomb at St Peter's, Powick.
