= William Henry Perrins =

English drug-store chemist (1793–1867)

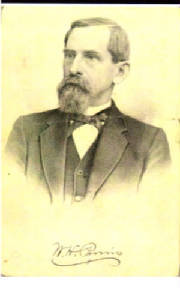
- Born: 13 July 1793; Chaddesley Corbett, Worcestershire, England
- Died: 6 January 1867 (aged 73); Claines, Worcestershire, England
- Occupation: Drug-store chemist
- Known for: Co-founder of company Lea & Perrins, co-creator of Worcestershire sauce
- Relatives: Charles William Dyson Perrins (grandson)
- Website: http://www.leaandperrins.co.uk

William Henry Perrins (13 July 1793 – 6 January 1867) was an English drug-store chemist who formed a business partnership with John Wheeley Lea in 1823. They went on to create the Lea & Perrins brand of Worcestershire sauce. He lived in Lansdowne Crescent in the parish of Claines, and is buried in St John, Baptist Churchyard, Claines.

According to the 1896 Daily Chronicle, Lord Sandys frequently purchased Worcestershire sauce in India. He visited the Lea & Perrins pharmacy "to talk about the appetising sauce, and humorously suggested that he would like to share in the proceeds," to which Perrins complacently responded "that Lord Sandys might share in the profits if he would stand behind the counter and assist in the sale."
