= Lea & Perrins =

UK condiment maker

Coordinates: 52.1902°N 2.2092°W

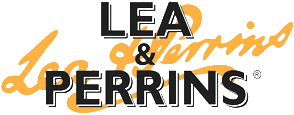
- Company type: Subsidiary
- Industry: Food
- Founded: 1837; 189 years ago
- Founders: John Wheeley Lea; William Henry Perrins
- Headquarters: Worcester, England
- Area served: Worldwide
- Products: Condiments
- Parent: HP Foods (1930–67); Imperial Brands (1967–88); Danone (1988–2005); Kraft Heinz (2005–pres.)

Lea & Perrins (L&P) is a United Kingdom-based subsidiary of Kraft Heinz, originating in Worcester, England, where it continues to operate. It is the manufacturer of Lea & Perrins Worcestershire sauce, a condiment first invented and sold in 1837 by chemists John Wheeley Lea and William Henry Perrins from Broad Street, Worcester.

It is currently produced in the Midland Road factory in Worcester that Lea and Perrins built. The sauce was first imported to the United States by the Duncan family of New York in 1839 and they continued to be involved for over a hundred years. A subsidiary in Pittsburgh currently manufactures an American version of the recipe.

== Worcestershire sauce ==
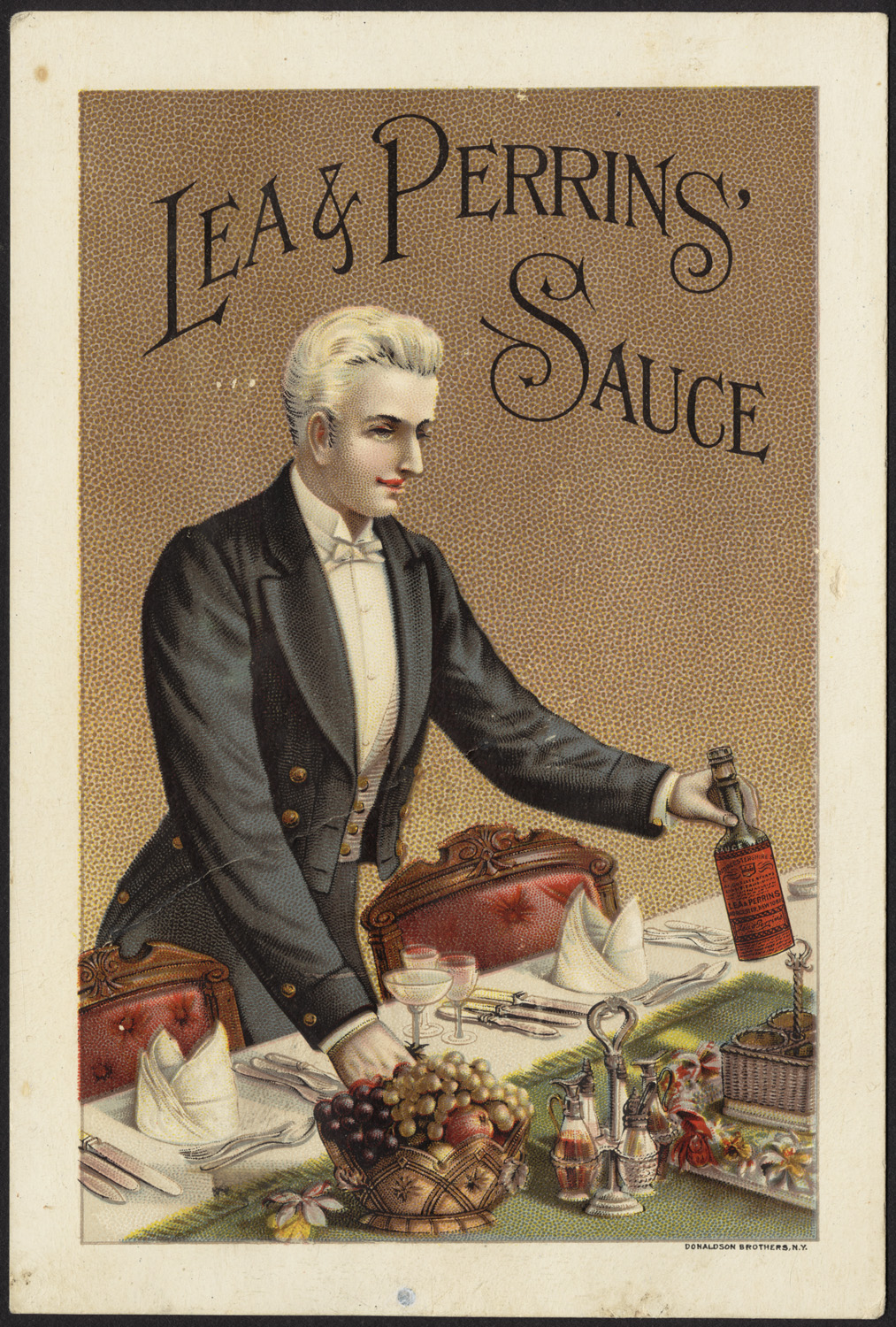
American trade card for Lea & Perrins, c. 1880, created by Donaldson Brothers

Worcestershire Sauce is produced at the Midland Road factory in Worcester, built by Lea and Perrins. Midland Road was named after the Midland Railway, the factory originally having rail sidings to provide raw materials and distribution.

=== Ingredients ===
Lea & Perrins Worcestershire Sauce UK and US recipes differ slightly in that the UK recipe uses malt vinegar while the US version uses distilled white vinegar. Also, the US version used high fructose corn syrup until 2011 when they reverted to sugar due to health concerns; the UK version has always used sugar. The UK version is sold in Australia, New Zealand and Canada. The US version contains three times more sugar and slightly more than three times as much sodium per one-third ounce. While the UK version references the 18 month aging process prominently on the front label of the bottle and in ad copy, the US bottle does not mention aging. The Kraft US website does reference aging but does not state how long it is aged for. Lea & Perrins uses a distinctive paper wrapper for the version sold in the United States. In the UK, the bottle is known to consumers for its shape and the orange and black label. Since November 1874, the label features a Lea&Perrins signature to address "spurious imitations calculated to deceive the Public" (picture below).

Lea & Perrins Worcestershire Sauce
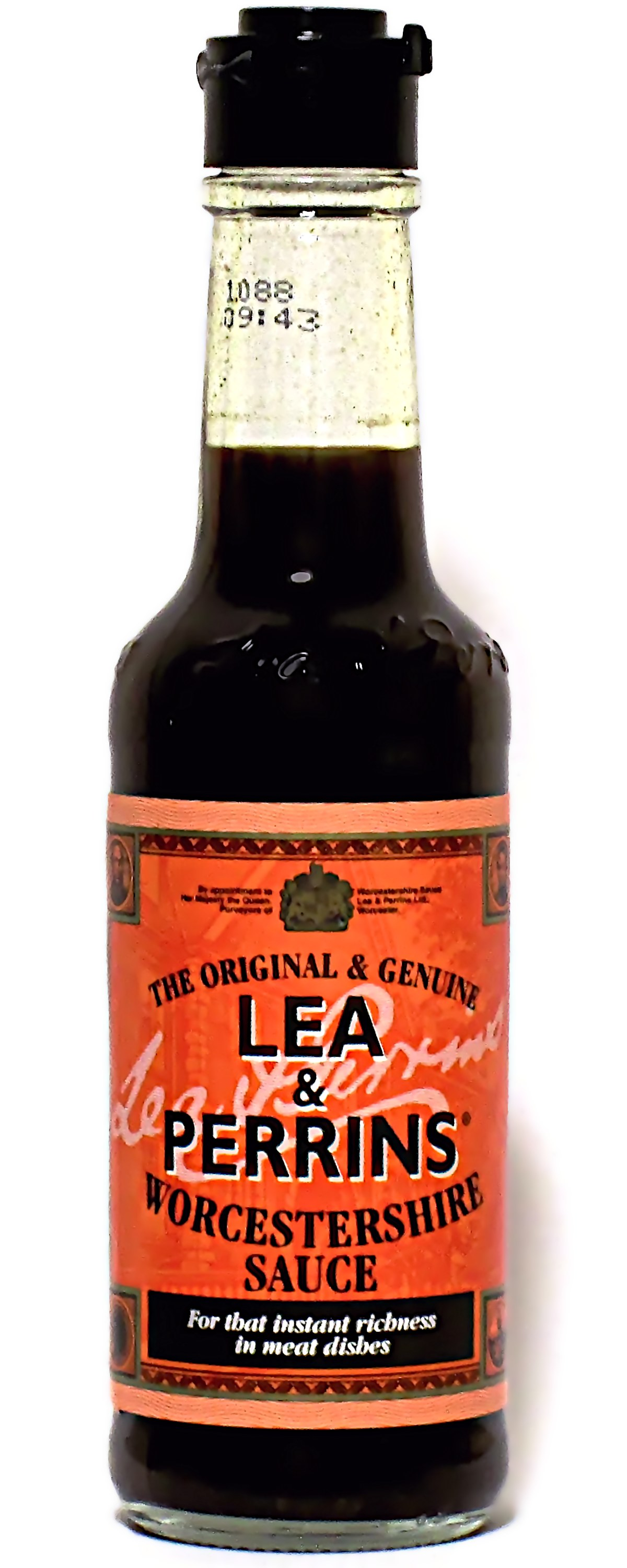
- 150 mL bottle, 2011

Nutritional value per 100 g (3.5 oz)
- Energy: 405 kJ (97 kcal)
- Carbohydrates: 21 g
- Fat: 0.9 g
- Protein: 0.8 g
- per 100 mL; serving size is 5 mL
- ^{†}Percentages estimated using US recommendations for adults.

The precise recipe has been a trade secret, but an original 19th-century list of ingredients was found in a skip at the factory in 2009 and includes vinegar, molasses, sugar, salt, anchovies, tamarind extract, onions, and garlic and other ingredients which may include cloves, soy sauce, lemons, pickles and peppers. The current recipe includes malt (or distilled white in the U.S.) vinegar, molasses, sugar, water, salt, onions, anchovies, garlic, cloves, tamarind extract, natural flavorings, and chili pepper extract.

== Other products ==
An 1846 advertising pamphlet by Lea & Perrins showcase their pharmacy's preparation of "Dr. Locock's Lotion for the Growth of the Hair", "Taraxacum" (dandelion coffee), and "Essence of Coffee", along with Worcestershire sauce.

While Kraft only markets a single variety of Worcestershire sauce under different sizes in the UK and in Canada, a few more products are marketed under the L&P brand in the United States. These include a reduced-sodium version of the sauce, a steak sauce, and marinades in peppercorn and vinaigrette flavours.

== Gallery ==
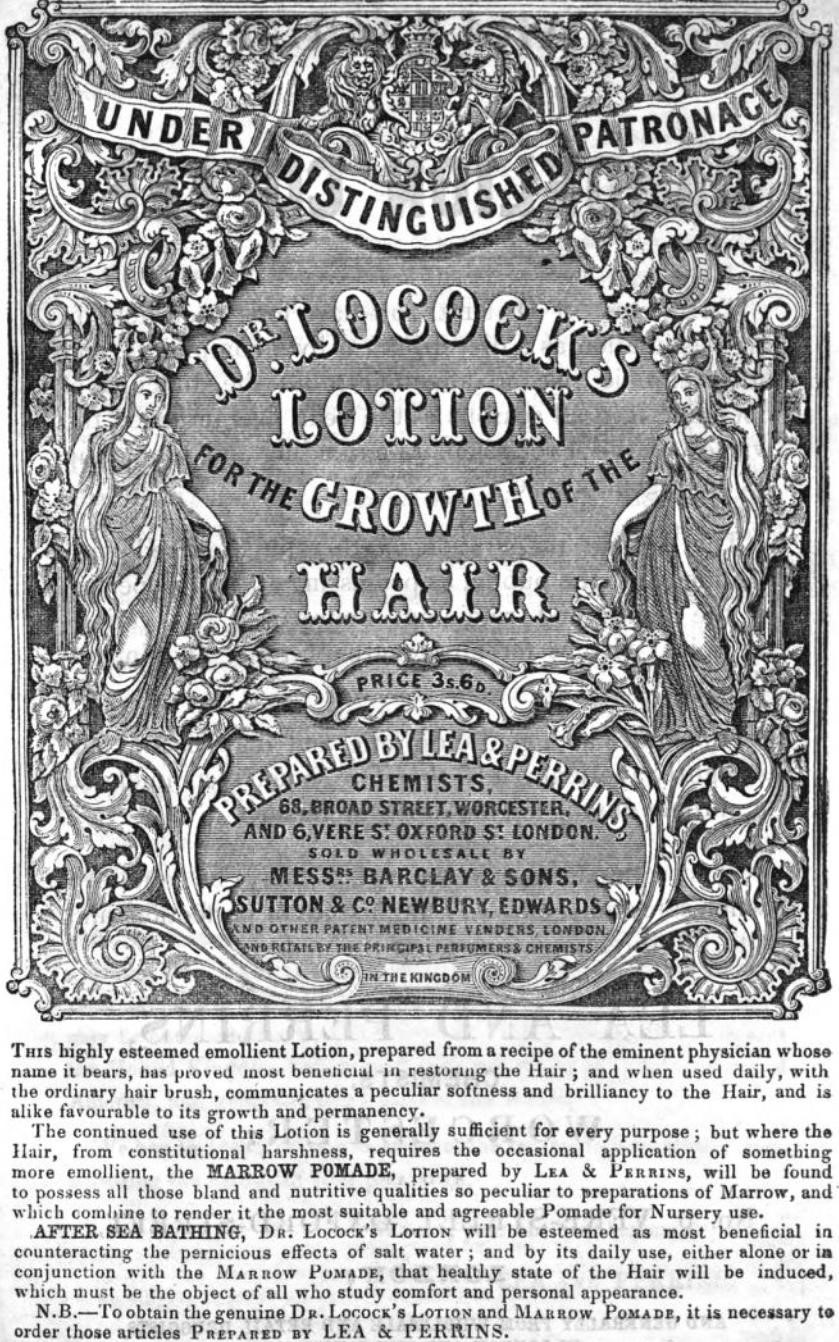
First page of Lea & Perrins advertising pamphlet describing their manufacture of Dr. Locock's hair growth lotion, 1846

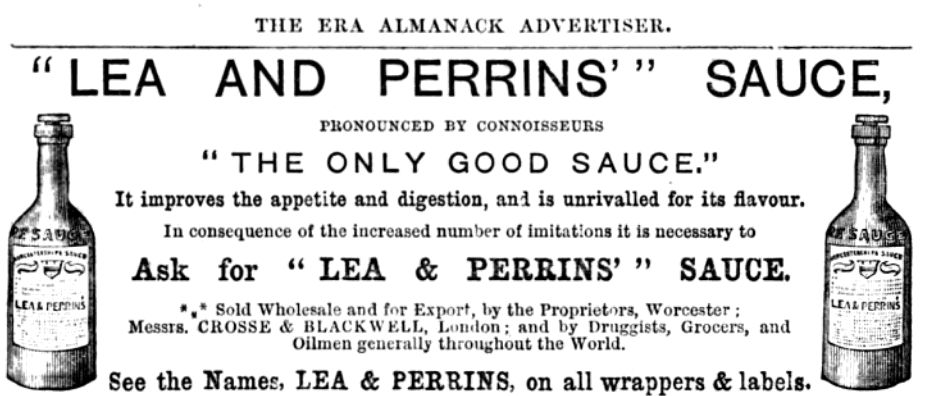
1875 ad for Lea & Perrins in the Era Almanack, with tagline "The Only Good Sauce"

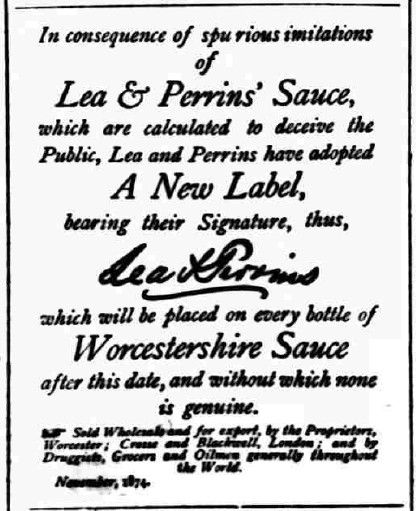
New label with signature to address "spurious imitations calculated to deceive the Public"

== See also ==
- Charles Dyson Perrins – English businessman, bibliophile, and philanthropist (1864–1958)
- Henderson's Relish – English condiment sauce
- HP Sauce – British brown sauce
- List of fish sauces
