= Worcestershire sauce =

English fermented condiment

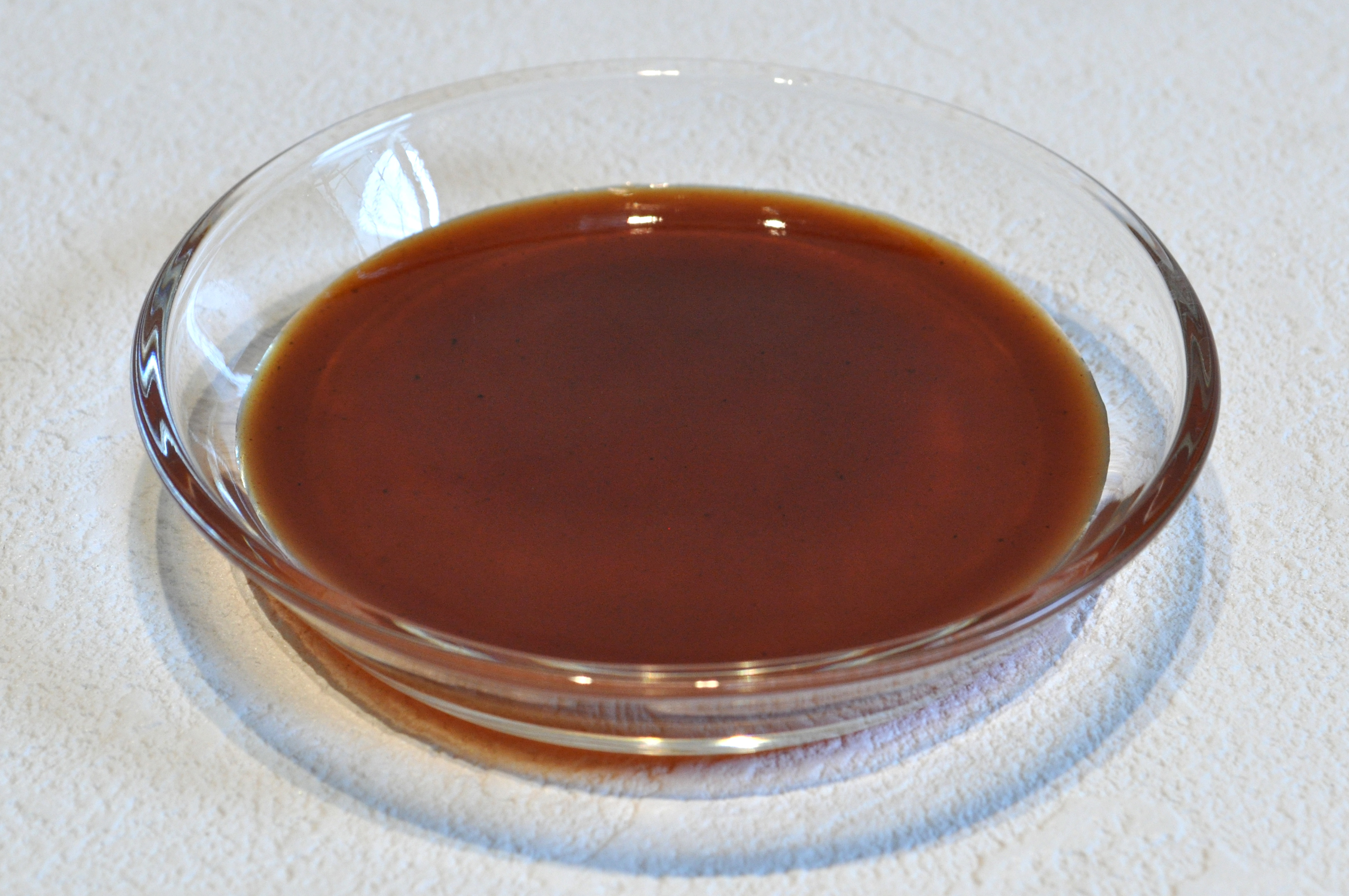
- Worcestershire sauce in a dish
- Alternative names: Worcester sauce
- Type: Condiment
- Place of origin: Worcester, England
- Created by: John Wheeley Lea; William Henry Perrins
- Main ingredients: Malt vinegar; spirit vinegar; anchovies; tamarind; garlic; onions; molasses; sugar; salt; spices; flavourings

Worcestershire sauce or Worcester sauce (/ˈwʊstər(ʃər)/ WUUS-tər(-shər)) is a fermented condiment invented by the pharmacists John Wheeley Lea and William Henry Perrins in Worcester, Worcestershire, England, during the first half of the 19th century. They later formed the company Lea & Perrins. Worcestershire sauce has been a generic term since 1876, when the High Court of Justice ruled that Lea & Perrins did not own a trademark for the name "Worcestershire".

Worcestershire sauce is used on steaks, hamburgers, and other finished dishes, and to flavour cocktails such as the Bloody Mary and Caesar. It is also used to augment recipes such as Welsh rarebit, Caesar salad, Oysters Kirkpatrick, and devilled eggs. As a background flavour and a source of savouriness, it is added to dishes such as beef stew and baked beans.

== History ==
Fish-based fermented sauces, such as garum, date back to antiquity. In the seventeenth century, English recipes for sauces (typically to put on fish) already combined anchovies with other ingredients.

The Lea & Perrins brand was commercialised in 1837 and was the first sauce to bear the Worcestershire name. The origin of the Lea & Perrins recipe is unclear. The packaging originally stated that the sauce came "from the recipe of a nobleman in the county". The company has also claimed that "Lord Sandys, ex-Governor of Bengal" encountered it while in India with the East India Company in the 1830s, and commissioned the local pharmacists (the partnership of John Wheeley Lea and William Perrins of 63 Broad Street, Worcester) to recreate it. However, neither Marcus Lord Sandys nor any Baron Sandys was ever a Governor of Bengal, nor had they ever visited India as far as available records indicate.

According to company lore, when the recipe was first mixed, the resulting product was so strong that it was considered inedible and the barrel was abandoned in the basement. Looking to make space in the storage area some 18 months later, the chemists decided to try it and discovered that the long-fermented sauce had mellowed and become palatable. In 1838, the first bottles of Lea & Perrins Worcestershire sauce were released to the general public.

== Ingredients ==
The ingredients vary by manufacturer but often include vinegar; salt; a sweetener such as sugar or molasses; aromatics such as garlic, shallots, or onions; soy sauce; and fish or fish sauce. Some formulations may include tamarind, umeboshi or other pickles, chili peppers, citrus, or spices, such as cloves.

Several anchovy-free vegetarian and vegan varieties are available for those who avoid, or are allergic to, fish. The Codex Alimentarius recommends that prepared food containing Worcestershire sauce with anchovies include a label warning of fish content, although this is not required in most jurisdictions. The U.S. Department of Agriculture has required the recall of some products with undeclared Worcestershire sauce. Generally, Orthodox Jews refrain from eating fish and meat in the same dish, so they do not use traditional Worcestershire sauce to season meat. However, certain brands are certified to contain less than 1/60 of the fish product and can be used with meat.

Although soy sauce is used in many variations of Worcestershire sauce since the 1880s, it is debated whether Lea & Perrins has ever used any in their preparation. According to William Shurtleff's SoyInfo Center, a 1991 letter from factory general manager J. W. Garnett describes the brand switching to hydrolyzed vegetable protein during World War II due to shortages. As of 2021, soy is not declared as an ingredient in the Lea & Perrins sauce.

== Varieties ==
=== Lea & Perrins ===
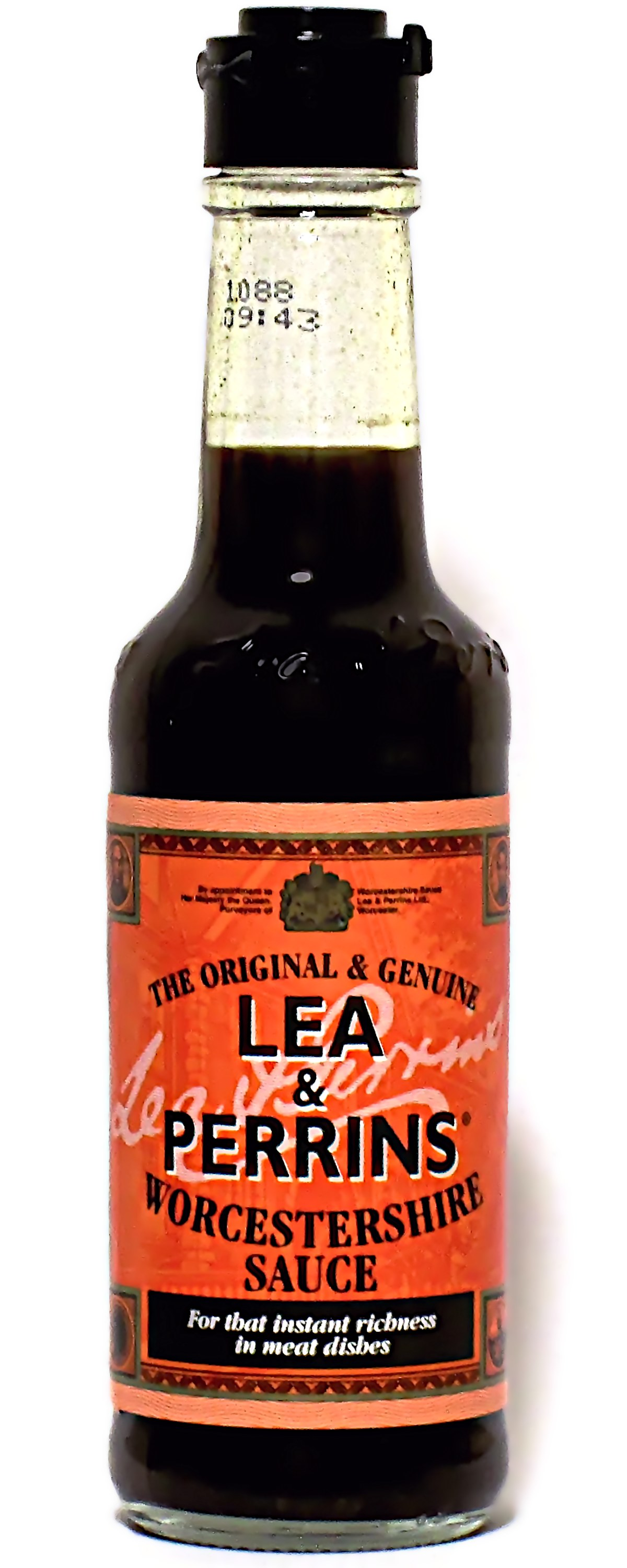
Lea & Perrins as sold in the UK, Canada and other countries

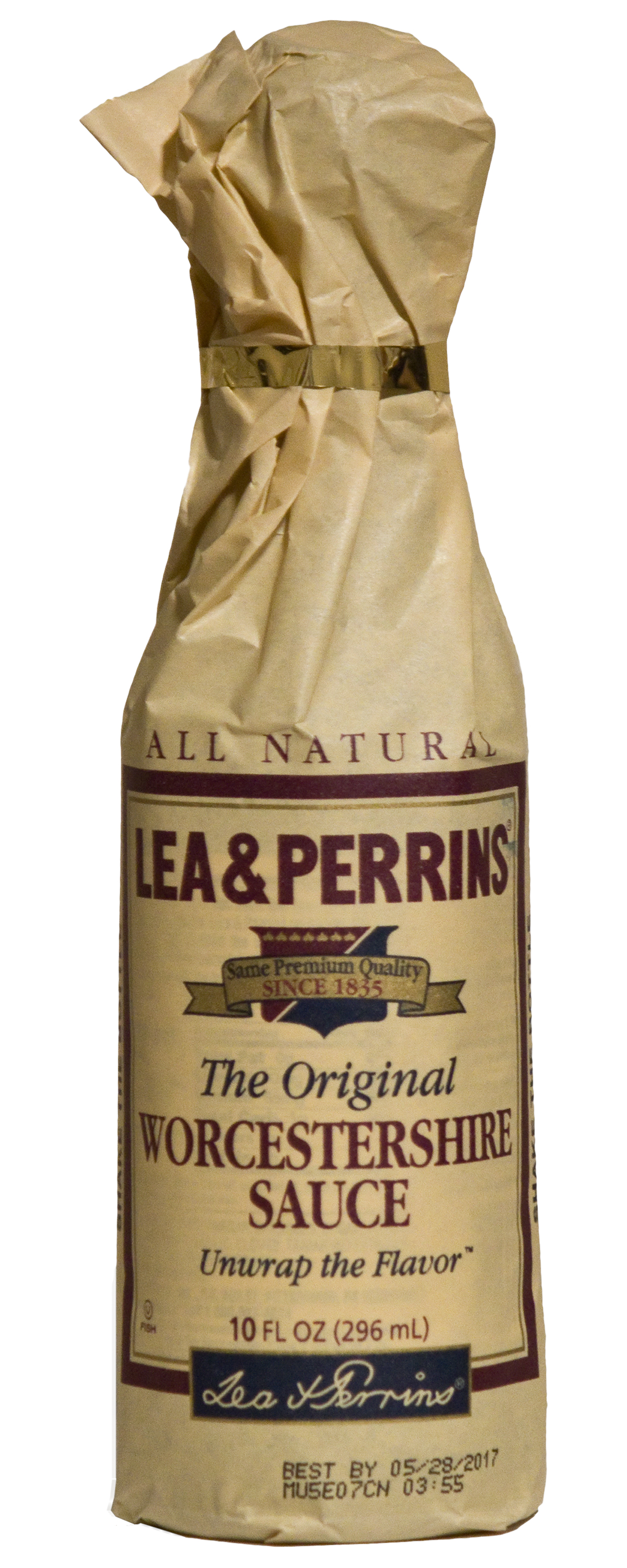
Lea & Perrins as sold in the U.S.

The Lea & Perrins brand was commercialised in 1837 and continues to be the leading global brand of Worcestershire sauce.

On 16 October 1897, Lea & Perrins relocated manufacturing of the sauce from their Broad Street pharmacy in Worcester to a factory on Midland Road, where it is still made. The factory produces ready-mixed bottles for domestic distribution and a concentrate for bottling abroad.

In 1930, the Lea & Perrins operation was purchased by HP Foods, which was in turn acquired by the Imperial Tobacco Company in 1967. HP was sold to Danone in 1988 and then to Heinz in 2005.

Some sizes of bottles sold by Lea & Perrins in the United States come packaged in dark glass with a beige label and wrapped in paper. Lea & Perrins USA explains this practice as a vestige of shipping practices from the 19th century, when the product was imported from England, as a measure of protection for the bottles. The producer also claims that its Worcestershire sauce is the oldest commercially bottled condiment in the U.S. The ingredients in the US version of Lea & Perrins also differ somewhat, in that the US version (which include distilled white vinegar, molasses, sugar, water, salt, onions, anchovies, garlic, cloves, tamarind extract, natural flavourings, and chili pepper extract) replaces the malt vinegar used by the UK and Canadian versions with spirit vinegar.

=== Brazil and Portugal ===
In Brazil and Portugal, it is known as molho inglês ('English sauce').

=== Costa Rica ===
In Costa Rica, a local derivative of the sauce is Salsa Lizano, created in 1920 and a staple condiment in homes and restaurants. Unlike traditional preparations, the Costa Rican version has a sweeter flavor and is made from a vegetable base.

=== El Salvador ===
Worcestershire sauce, known as salsa inglesa ('English sauce') or salsa Perrins ('Perrins sauce'), is very popular in El Salvador. Many restaurants provide a bottle on each table, and the per capita annual consumption is 2.5 ounces (71 g), the highest in the world as of 1996.

=== Germany ===
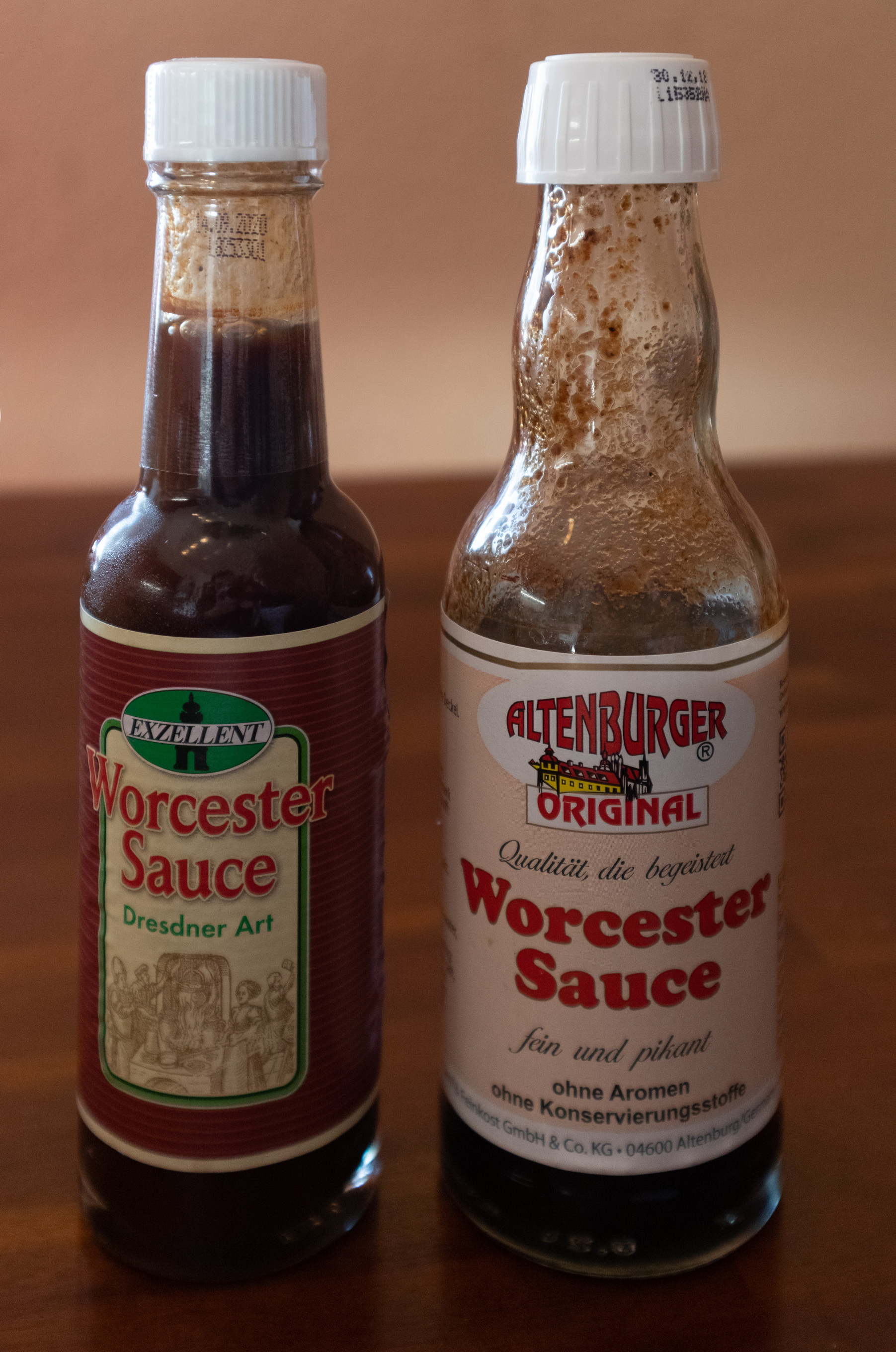
Worcestershire sauces based on GDR recipes

A sweeter, less salty version of the sauce called Worcestersauce Dresdner Art was developed in the beginning of the 20th century in Dresden, where it is still being produced. It contains smaller amounts of anchovies. It is mostly consumed in the eastern part of the country.

=== Mexico ===
In Mexico, it is known as salsa inglesa (English sauce). It is a common ingredient in micheladas, a popular beer cocktail.

=== United Kingdom, Australia ===
Holbrook's Worcestershire sauce was produced in Birmingham, England from 1875: today only the Australian subsidiary survives. Holbrook's Worcestershire sauce remains very popular in Australia where it is a staple in many households.

=== United States ===
Lea & Perrins Worcestershire Sauce is sold in the United States by Kraft Heinz following the Kraft & Heinz merger in 2015.

Other Worcestershire sauce brands in the United States include French's, which was introduced in 1941.

=== Venezuela ===
It is commonly named salsa inglesa ('English sauce') and is part of many traditional dishes such as Hallacas (a traditional Christmas dish) and some versions of Asado Negro.

=== Non-fish variations ===
Some "Worcestershire sauces" are inspired by the original sauce but have deviated significantly from the original taste profile, most notably by the exclusion of fish.

Thai Gy-Nguang brand Formula 2 Worcestershire sauce (2010)

Gy-Nguang (Thai: ไก่งวง) Worcestershire sauce has been produced since 1917. It relies on soy sauce instead of anchovies for the umami flavour. The company makes two versions: Formula 1 for Asian taste, and Formula 2 for international taste. The two differ only in that Formula 2 contains slightly less soy sauce and slightly more spices.

In Japan, Worcestershire sauce is labelled Worcester (rather than Worcestershire), rendered as ウスターソース (Usutā sōsu). Many sauces are more of a vegetarian variety, with the base being water, syrup, vinegar, puree of apple and tomato puree, and the flavour less spicy and sweeter. Japanese Agricultural Standard defines Worcester-type sauces by viscosity, with Worcester sauce proper having a viscosity of less than 0.2 poiseuille, 0.2–2.0 poiseuille sauces categorised as Chūnō sōsu (中濃ソース), commonly used in Kantō region and northwards, and sauces over 2.0 poiseuille categorised as Nōkō sōsu (濃厚ソース); they are manufactured under brand names such as Otafuku and Bulldog, but these are brown sauces more similar to HP Sauce than to Worcestershire sauce.

Tonkatsu sauce is a thicker Worcester-style sauce made from vegetables and fruits and associated with the dish tonkatsu.

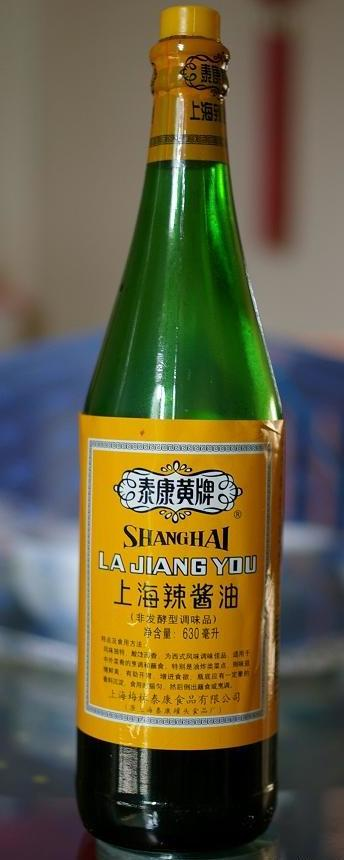
A bottle of Shanghainese "spicy soy sauce", Taikang Yellow brand

Worcestershire sauce has a history of multiple introduction in Chinese-speaking areas. These sauces, each differently named, have diverged both from the original and from each other:

Spicy soy sauce (Chinese: 辣酱油; pinyin: là jiàngyóu), Shanghai
Worcestershire sauce was first produced under this name in 1933 by Mailing Aquarius, then an English-owned company. With Mailing moving to Hong Kong in 1946, the Shanghai branch was nationalised in 1954. Sauce production was transferred to Taikang in 1960. The sauce was reformulated in 1981 under a "nine flavours in one" formula, and again changed in 1990 into two "Taikang Yellow" and "Taikang Blue" varieties. As of 2020, only the yellow variety remains available.
The Taikang Yellow sauce contains no fish. It is used in Haipai cuisine, especially on pork chops and Shanghainese borscht.
A descendant of an earlier form of the sauce is found in Taiwan as "Mailing spicy soy sauce", originally produced by the HK branch of Mailing. It is found in steakhouses.
Gip-sauce (Chinese: 喼汁; pinyin: jízhī; Jyutping: gip1zap1), Hong Kong
This variety is of uncertain etymology: it may have come from catsup or the verb give. Save for the Lea & Perrins original sold as a gip-sauce, most varieties of this type have a stronger umami flavour with the addition of soy sauce, fish sauce, and/or MSG; some commercial varieties forgo fish altogether. This sauce is commonly used in dim sum dishes such as steamed meatball and spring rolls.
Spicy vinegar (辣香酢), Taiwan
This variety is descended from the Japanese Worcester Sauce via the Kongyen company, originally founded by Japanese businesspeople. It is also known under the name Taiwan Black Vinegar due to confusion post-WW2.

== See also ==
- A.1. Sauce
- Anglo-Indian cuisine
- Fish sauce
- Oyster sauce
- Soy sauce
- French's
- Henderson's Relish – similar sauce without fish
- List of sauces
- Sarson's
