= Scrambled eggs =

Culinary egg dish

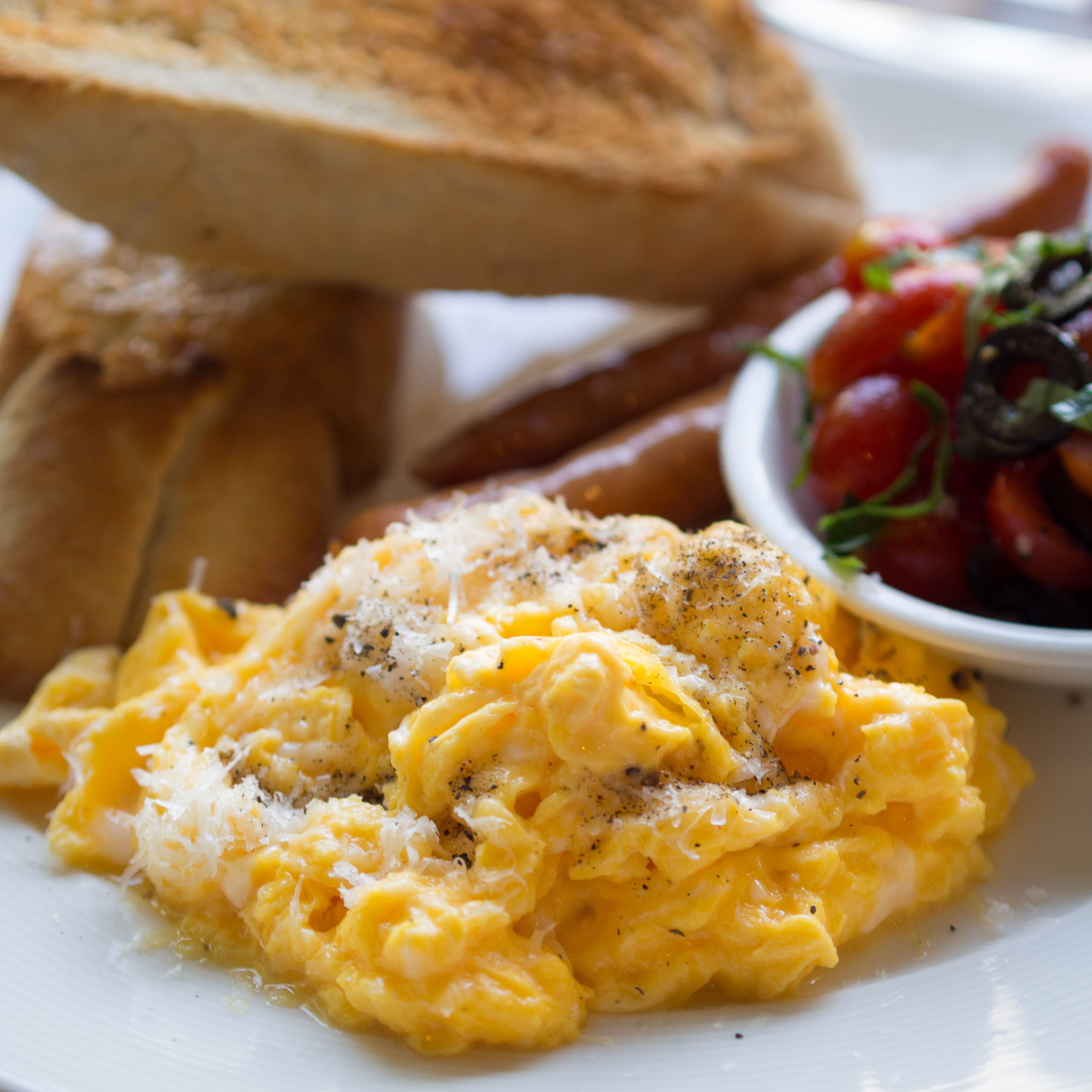
- Scrambled eggs
- Place of origin: Worldwide
- Main ingredients: Eggs
- Ingredients generally used: Salt & pepper, butter, milk/water

Scrambled eggs is a culinary dish made from eggs (usually chicken eggs), where the whites and yolks have been stirred, whipped, or beaten together (typically with the addition of other ingredients), then heated so that the proteins denature and coagulate, and they form into "curds".

== History ==
The earliest documented recipe for scrambled eggs was in the 14th-century Italian cookbook Libro della cucina.

== Preparation ==
Only eggs are necessary to make scrambled eggs, but salt and pepper, butter, milk, water, chives, cream, crème fraîche, sour cream, grated cheese, and other ingredients may be added as recipes vary.

The eggs are cracked into a bowl with salt and pepper, and the mixture is stirred or whisked. Alternatively, the eggs are cracked directly into a hot pan or skillet, and the whites and yolks stirred together as they cook. In Food in England (1954) Dorothy Hartley comments, "There are two main schools: one (which I believe to be correct) breaks in the eggs direct, so that particles of clear white and clear yellow remain in the creamy mass. The other school beats the eggs together first, maintaining it gives a smoother texture". Elizabeth David (1960) takes the latter view: "For scrambled eggs, unlike those for an omelette, the eggs should be very well beaten".

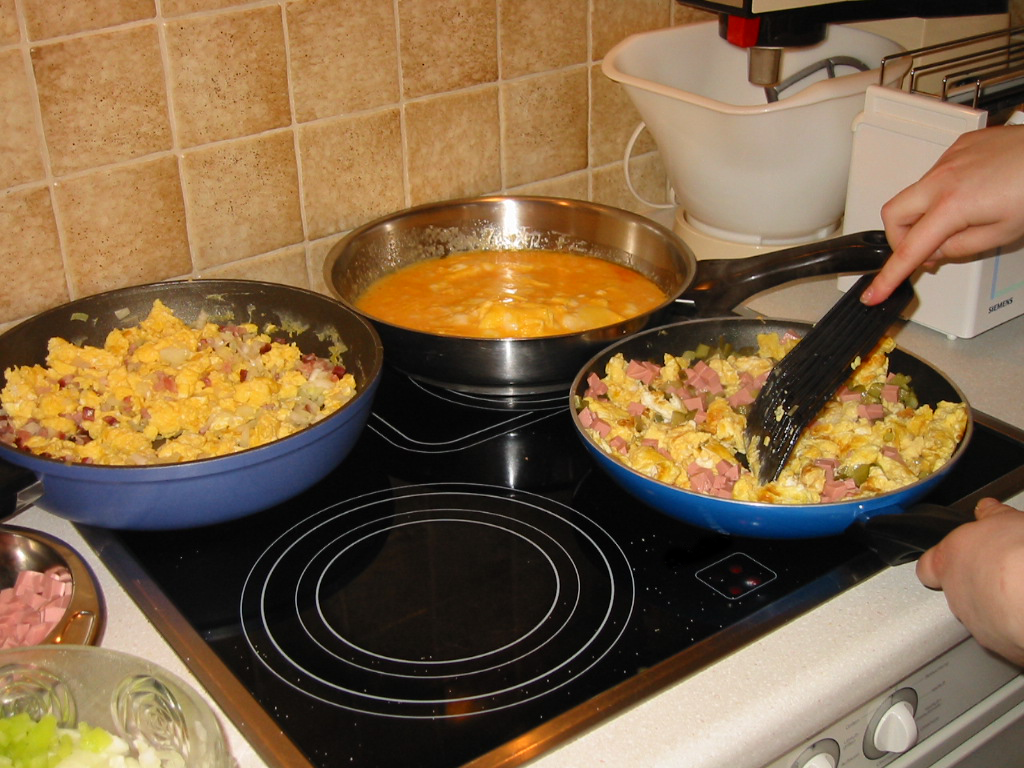
Preparation in pans

The mixture can be poured into a hot pan containing melted butter or oil, where it starts coagulating. The heat is turned down and the eggs are stirred as they cook. This creates small, soft curds of egg. A thin pan is preferable to prevent browning. With continuous stirring, and not allowing the eggs to stick to the pan, the eggs themselves will maintain the pan temperature at about the boiling point of water, until they coagulate. In their Mastering the Art of French Cooking (1961), Simone Beck, Louisette Bertholle and Julia Child write, "Scrambled eggs in French style are creamy soft curds that just hold their shape from fork to mouth. Their preparation is entirely a matter of stirring the eggs over gentle heat until they slowly thicken as a mass into a custard."

Alternatively, Escoffier describes using a double boiler as the heating source, which does not need adjustment as the direct heating method does. The eggs are directly placed in the cooker and mixed during the heating and not before. Cooking by this method prevents the eggs from browning while being cooked and gives aerated and creamy scrambled eggs. This method was used in the "old classical kitchen" and guarantees the eggs are always cooked perfectly; it is, however, more time-consuming than the modern skillet method, taking up to 40 minutes to ensure perfect quality.

Once the liquid has mostly set, additional ingredients, such as ham, herbs, cheese, or cream, may be folded in over low heat until incorporated. The eggs are usually slightly undercooked when removed from heat since the eggs will continue to set. If any liquid is seeping from the eggs (syneresis), this is a sign of undercooking, overcooking, or adding undercooked high-moisture vegetables.

Scrambled eggs can be cooked in a microwave oven, and can also be prepared using sous-vide cooking, which gives the traditional smooth creamy texture and requires only occasionally mixing during cooking. Another technique for cooking creamy scrambled eggs is to pipe steam into eggs with butter via a steam wand (as found on an espresso machine).

== Variations ==
121 variants of scrambled egg

| Name | English | Ingredients | Ref |
|---|---|---|---|
| à l'amiral | admiral's style | garnished with diced lobster, served with lobster sauce | |
| aux anchois | with anchovies | mixed with chopped anchovies garnished with strips of anchovy fillets | |
| Antoine | | mixed with diced fried bacon, herbs and capers covered with brown butter | |
| à l'archiduchesse | archduchess | mixed with diced ham and mushrooms, seasoned with paprika, garnished with asparagus | |
| à l'Argenteuil | with asparagus | garnished with asparagus tips | |
| à l'arlésienne | Arles style | mixed with diced aubergine and tomatoes tossed in butter | |
| Aumale | | mixed with diced tomatoes, with diced veal kidneys in madeira sauce in the centre | |
| Balzac | | mixed with diced ox tongue and truffle, garnished with croutons coated with onion purée served with demi-glace tomato | |
| à la batelière | boatsmans style | mixed with chopped chives, served in tartlets lined with purée of sole | |
| Belly | | mixed with diced salt pork and chopped chives served with demi-glace | |
| Benclan | | garnished with diced peppers, sprinkled with chopped truffles | |
| à la bonne femme | housewife's style | mixed with croutons fried in butter, served with demi-glace | |
| à la bordelaise | Bordeaux style | mixed with diced mushrooms, garnished with triangles of fried bread, served with bordelaise sauce | |
| à la bourguignonne | Burgundy style | mixed with chopped snails, diced bacon, garlic chopped nuts and parsley, served with Madeira sauce | |
| à la brésilienne | Brazilian style | mixed with strips of red peppers, served in puff pastry case, served with tomato sauce, mixed with chopped ham | |
| Bresse | | garnished with sautéed chicken livers and slices of truffle, served with demi-glace | |
| Cambridge | Cambridge style | mixed with diced lobster, mushrooms and peppers served with cream sauce | |
| Cannelons | | puff pastry horns filled with scrambled eggs | |
| Carême | | mixed with diced goose liver, chicken and truffles served in puff pastry shell, garnished with sliced truffle served with demi-glace | |
| Carnot | | mixed with cockscombs and mushrooms, garnished with cocks' kidneys, served with demi-glace | |
| à la châlonnaise | Chalons style | garnished with cockscombs and kidneys, with cream sauce | |
| Chambord | | served on slices of fried aubergine, served with demi-glace | |
| aux champignons | with mushrooms | mixed with diced or sliced mushrooms, served with Spanish sauce | |
| Chantilly | with whipped cream | mixed with whipped cream, sprinkled with chopped chives | |
| Châtillon | | garnished with sliced, sautéed mushrooms, sprinkled with chopped chives, topped with fried parsley | |
| à la comtesse | countess | mixed with shrimps garnished with asparagus tips, served with demi-glace | |
| aux crevettes | with shrimps | mixed with shrimps | |
| Crispi | | garnished with diced, sautéed tomatoes and croutons fried in butter | |
| aux croûtons | with fried bread | mixed with small croutons fried in butter | |
| Divette | | mixed with crayfish tails, served with crayfish sauce mixed with diced crayfish and asparagus tips | |
| Don Juan | | mixed with chopped green peppers, garnished with strips of anchovy fillets, served with madeira sauce | |
| Eierrösti | | diced bread, soaked in warm milk stirred mixed with hot butter and beaten eggs, prepared the same way as scrambled eggs (Swiss) | |
| Elliot | | dressed in border of rice, served with madeira sauce | |
| Elvira | | mixed with diced truffles, filled in flat puff pastry shell, garnished with fried goose liver coated with paprika sauce, green asparagus tips dressed in centre | |
| à l'épicurienne | epicurean | truffles and mushrooms, served with demi-glace | |
| Esau | | mixed with diced fried bacon, dressed on bed of lentils, served with demi-glace | |
| À l'espagnole | Spanish style | served on halved fried tomatoes, garnished thinly sliced peppers | |
| à l'estragon | with tarragon | mixed with chopped tarragon, served with demi-glace with tarragon essence | |
| Figaro | | garnished with sliced sausage, served with Montebello sauce | |
| aux fines herbes | with herbs | mixed with chopped parsley, tarragon, chervil and chives | |
| aux foies de volaille | with chicken livers | garnished with sautéed chicken livers tossed in Madeira sauce | |
| Forestière | forester-style | with mushrooms and diced bacon | |
| Georgette | | served in baked potato skins, eggs mixed with diced crayfish | |
| Gordon | | mixed with truffles, served in puff pastry shell, garnished with beef marrow, served with Chateaubriand sauce | |
| à la grand'mère | grandmother's style | mixed with chopped parsley and croutons fried in butter | |
| Graziella | | large brioche, hollowed out, filled with plain scrambled eggs and sautéed slices of mushrooms, served with fried slices of veal kidneys | |
| à la hambourgeoise | Hamburg style | garnished with strips of boned and skinned herring fillets | |
| Hangtown fry | | mixed with diced fried bacon and fried oysters | |
| Héloïse | | mixed with strips of ox tongue, chicken and mushrooms served with tomato sauce | |
| a l'homard | with lobster | garnished with diced lobster in lobster sauce | |
| Huysmans | | mixed with diced mushrooms and artichoke bottoms, filled in puff pastry shell, garnished with slices of veal kidneys, served with madeira sauce | |
| a l'italienne | Italian style | in risotto with diced tomatoes, served with tomato sauce | |
| au jambon | with ham | mixed with diced or chopped ham | |
| Jérôme | | puff pastry shell half filled with chopped game, topped with scrambled eggs | |
| Joinville | | mixed with diced shrimps, mushrooms and truffles, served in puff pastry case, garnished with shrimps, a slice of truffle and a mushroom | |
| à la laitière | dairymaid style | mixed with grated Emmenthal cheese, chopped parsley, chives and chervil | |
| Lesseps | | garnished with slices of fried calf's brain, poured over with brown butter | |
| Leuchtenberg | | mixed with chopped chives, caviar in the centre | |
| Lucullus | | mixed with diced truffles, garnished with slices of truffles, served with demi-glace | |
| à la madrilène | Madrid style | mixed with cream and diced sautéed tomatoes | |
| Magda | | mixed with chopped herbs, mustard and grated Parmesan, garnished with fried triangular croutons | |
| Manon | | mixed with chopped mushrooms and truffles, dressed on tartlet of chicken forcemeat croquette, served with truffled velouté sauce | |
| Marie | | mixed with grated parmesan, in puff pastry case, sprinkled with chopped truffles | |
| Marivaux | | mixed with chopped truffles, large mushroom cap in centre, served with sliced mushrooms and meat glaze | |
| Mary | | mixed with chopped truffles and sweet red peppers dressed in puff pastry case | |
| à la mauresque | Moorish style | mixed with chopped tried sausage and ham | |
| Mercédès | | mixed with chopped chives, dressed in flat hollow brioche or roll filled with diced tomatoes tossed in oil, served with tomato sauce | |
| à la mexicaine | Mexican style | mixed with diced green peppers, served with tomato sauce | |
| Mezerai | | garnished with grilled halved lamb kidneys and truffle slices, served with truffle sauce | |
| à la monégasque | Monaco | garnished with slices of lobster, masked with lobster sauce | |
| Montbarry | | mixed with diced mushrooms truffles and alien-ragas tips, served on rice mixed with grated parmesan and Swiss cheese | |
| à la nantaise | Nantes style | on fried bread croutons, garnished with sardines | |
| Nantua | | mixed with diced crayfish tails and truffles, garnished with sliced truffles, served with crayfish sauce | |
| à la normande, | Normandy style | garnished with poached oysters served with Normandy sauce | |
| à la norvégienne | Norwegian style | garnished with strips of anchovy fillets and served on toast | |
| œufs de vanneau à la printanière | scrambled plovers eggs, spring style | in flat puff pastry case, topped with puree of morels, mixed with diced truffles, sprinkled with chopped herbs | |
| Opera | | mixed with diced sautéed chicken livers, garnished with asparagus tips, served with buttered veal gravy | |
| à l'orientale | oriental style | mixed with diced tomatoes, sautéed with onions, and diced green peppers, garnished with croutons coated with onion puree, served with meat glaze | |
| Orloff | | garnished with crayfish tails and truffles | |
| a l'ostendaise | ostend style | mixed with poached oysters, served with oyster sauce | |
| Panthéon | | mixed with diced chicken livers and mushrooms, garnished with fleurons served with truffle sauce | |
| Parmentier | | diced fried potatoes, in meat glaze with chopped parsley | |
| aux Parmesan | with Parmesan | mixed with grated Parmesan, sprinkled with chopped parsley | |
| Paulus | | garnished with diced tomatoes and sweet green peppers | |
| Pisto Manchego Espanola | | mixed with diced bacon, tomatoes, chopped onions and parsley sautéed in oil (Spanish) | |
| aux pointes d'asperges | with asparagus tips | mixed with green asparagus tips, a small bunch of asparagus tips in the centre | |
| à la portugaise | Portuguese style | mixed with diced tomatoes, served with tomato sauce muted tomatoes in centre | |
| Princess | | mixed with asparagus tips, garnished with asparagus tips and truffle slices, served with cream sauce | |
| Princess Marie | | mixed with grated parmesan and diced truffles, served in pastry shells or cocotte dishes | |
| à la provençale | Provençal style | mixed with diced tomatoes, garlic and chopped parsley | |
| Rachel | | mixed with diced truffles and asparagus tips, garnished with sliced truffles, served with demi-glace | |
| Ranhofer | | served in artichoke bottoms, garnished with ox marrow coated with burgundy sauce | |
| Raspail | | mixed with diced celery, tomatoes and cream | |
| à la reine Hortense | Queen Hortense | mixed with diced lobster and mushrooms, garnished with pilau rice, mixed with diced red peppers and peas, pressed into small moulds and turned out served with lobster sauce | |
| à la reine Margot | Queen Margaret | with pistachio butter and velouté, served in tartlets | |
| à la romaine | Roman style | mixed with chopped anchovy fillets, shredded spinach and garlic, served with demi-glace mixed with tomato purée | |
| Rothschild | | with crayfish, asparagus tips, sliced truffles and Nantua sauce | |
| Rôtisserie Périgourdine | | mixed with diced truffles, filled in flat puff pastry case, garnished with slices of truffles cooked in Burgundy, coated with buttered burgundy sauce | |
| Rotraud | | mixed with crayfish sauce, asparagus tips in centre, garnished with sliced truffles and crayfish tails, served with crayfish sauce | |
| Salamanque | Salamanca | mixed with diced truffles served on artichoke bottoms covered with cheese sauce and glazed | |
| Sans-gêne | | served on artichoke bottoms garnished with ox marrow, served with Burgundy sauce and sprinkled with chopped parsley | |
| Sappho Bernhardt | | garnished with slices of truffles cockscombs and cocks' kidneys, served with cream sauce | |
| Saragossa | | mixed with diced fried ham, garnished with thick fried slices of bananas and corn fritters, served with tomato sauce | |
| Schinkel | | mixed with strips of ham, artichoke bottoms and mushrooms, in border of puff pastry, served with buttered meat glaze mixed with chopped tarragon, crayfish butter dropped on top | |
| St Denis | | served in very large grilled mushroom caps, with red wine sauce | |
| à la suisse | Swiss style | mixed with diced Swiss cheese, in tartlets, sprinkled with grated cheese and gratinated | |
| à la sultane | sultan's style | finished with pistachio butter, served in baked border of duchess potatoes | |
| Sylvette | | served in puff pastry tartlet filled with crayfish purée, garnished with truffle, served with Madeira sauce | |
| Tartuffe | | mixed with fried diced bacon served in puff pastry case, served with truffle sauce | |
| aux tomates | with tomatoes | mixed with diced sautéed tomatoes | |
| Toronto | | served in hollowed out tomatoes, covered with Bordeaux sauce, sprinkled with grated cheese and glazed rapidly | |
| aux truffes | with truffles | mixed with diced truffles, garnished with truffle slices, served with demi-glace | |
| à la turque | Turkish style | half aubergine fried, tomatoes and onions, seasoned with saffron, topped with scrambled eggs | |
| Urbain Dubois | | mixed with diced lobster, served in hollowed lobster claws, coated with lobster sauce | |
| Vaucourt | | mixed with diced truffles and asparagus tips served in border of baked duchess potatoes, garnished with truffle slices, served with demi-glace | |
| Vert-pré | green meadow | tartlets half filled with puree of spinach or lettuce, topped with scrambled eggs, sprinkled with chopped herbs, served with velouté | |
| Villemain | | served in puff pastry tartlets or patties on chicken forcemeat eggs mixed with diced mushrooms | |
| Waldorf | | large grilled mushroom caps stuffed with scrambled eggs, small round slice of truffled goose liver pâté on top, served with truffle sauce | |
| Walewska | | garnished with dice of truffles and lobster, bound with cream sauce blended with lobster butter, served with the same sauce | |
| à la westphalienne | Westphalian style | mixed with fried diced Westphalian ham | |
| Yvette | | mixed with crayfish tails, garnished with asparagus tips, served with crayfish sauce | |

=== Britain ===
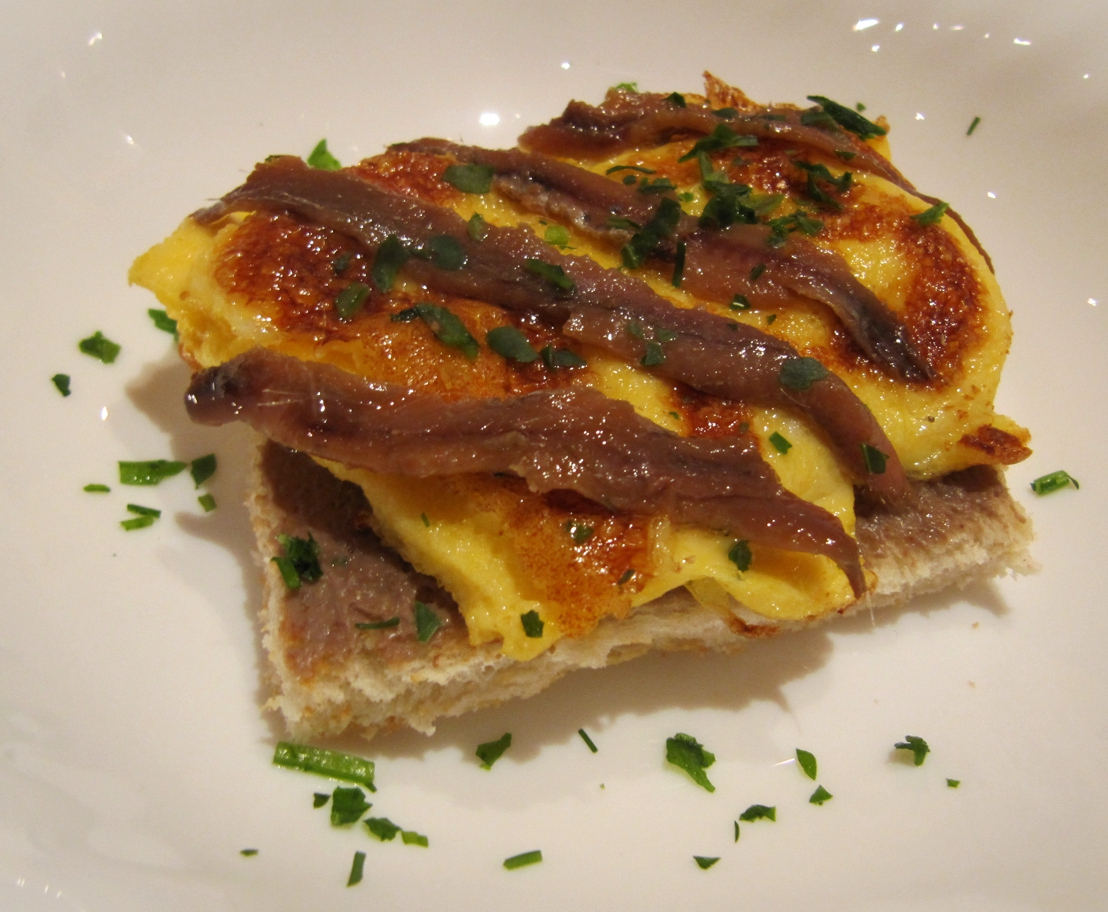
Scotch woodcock, a British dish of scrambled eggs and anchovy paste on toast

- In British style, the scrambled eggs are stirred thoroughly during cooking to give a soft, fine texture.
- Buttered eggs – a typically English dish, mentioned in 19th and early 20th-century literature; additional butter is melted and stirred into the egg mixture before cooking.
- Scotch woodcock – British variant of scrambled eggs, served over toast that has been spread with Gentleman's Relish.

=== France ===
Video showing the steps in which basic scrambled eggs are prepared with mushrooms and cheese

- There are more than a hundred variants of scrambled eggs (œufs brouillés) in French cuisine. Among the favoured additions are asparagus tips, crayfish, truffles, ham and mushrooms.

=== Italy ===
An Italian version of scrambled eggs: Uova stracciate al formaggio. In addition to the eggs and butter, cream is added, and when the eggs are cooked, grated Parmesan cheese is sprinkled on the top.

=== Nigeria ===
- The dish is called "fried eggs" in Nigeria. The mai shai stalls cook scrambled eggs to the point of being heavily crisp.

=== Philippines ===
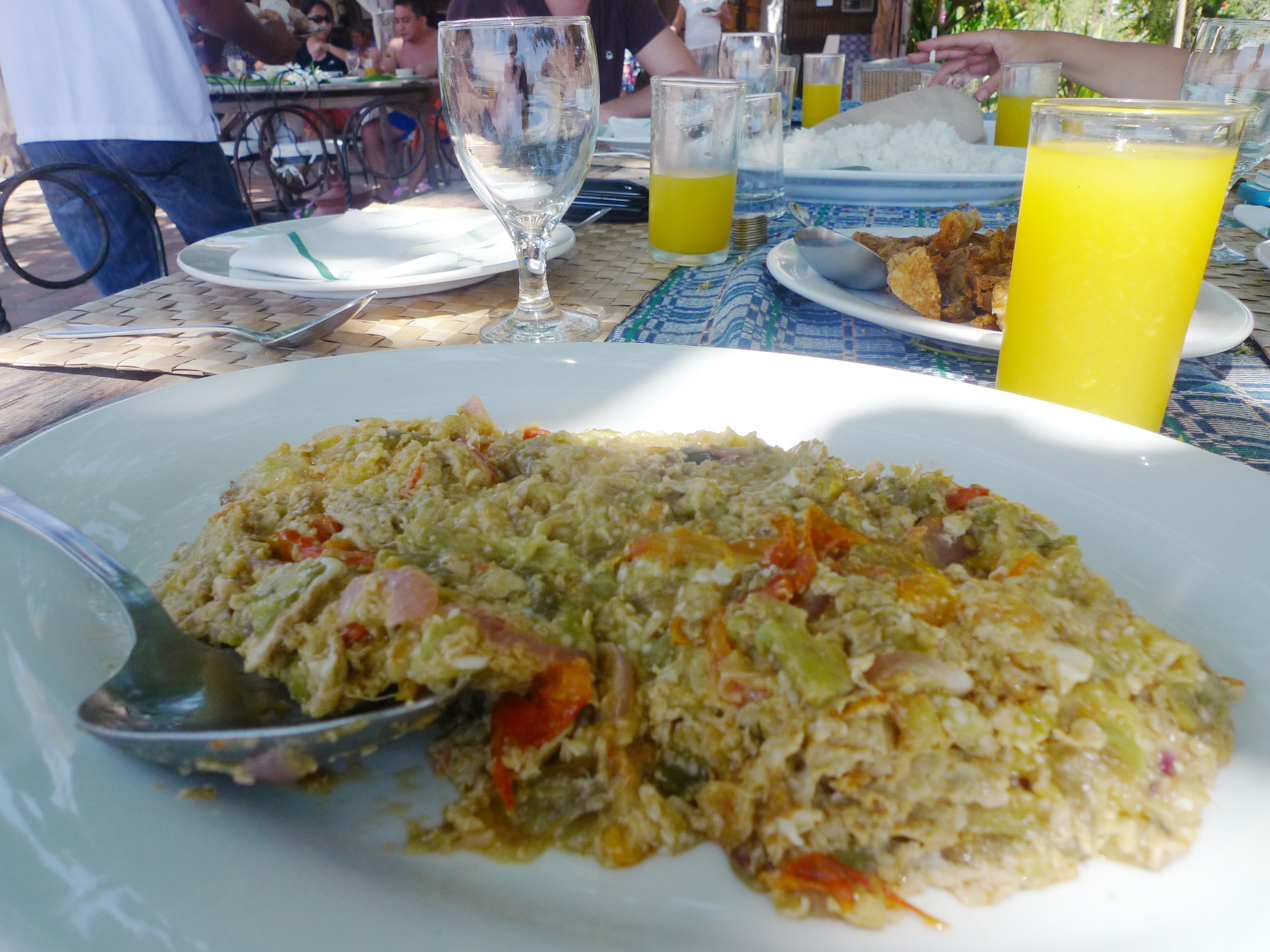
Poqui poqui, a scrambled egg dish with grilled eggplants, tomatoes, shallots, and garlic, from the Philippines

- Poqui poqui – a Filipino dish consisting of grilled eggplants with sauteed garlic, tomatoes, and shallots and scrambled eggs.

=== South America ===
- Parrot eggs ("Perico" in Spanish) is a dish in Venezuelan cuisine and Colombian cuisine prepared with scrambled eggs, butter, sautéed diced onions, and tomatoes. White cheese is also sometimes used.

=== Syria ===
- Jaz maz [جظ مظ] – a Syrian variant of scrambled eggs made by first frying chopped tomatoes and onions in oil, butter or ghee. After frying the vegetables, eggs and spices (usually salt, pepper, red pepper powder, and sometimes the spice mix 'sabaa baharat') are added. It is eaten with the traditional Syrian bread khubz. It is typically eaten as breakfast, but can be a lunch or dinner dish too.

=== United States ===
- Eggs frizzle – scrambled egg dish made with chipped beef "frizzled" in butter before eggs are added to the pan and scrambled. To make a variation called "Eggs a la Caracas" the beef is frizzled with tomatoes, spices, and grated cheese.
- In American style, the eggs are scooped in towards the middle of the pan as they set, giving larger curds.

== See also ==
- Egg as food
- Fried egg
- Ham and eggs
- List of brunch foods
- List of egg dishes
- Poached egg
