= Anchovies as food =

Preserved fish

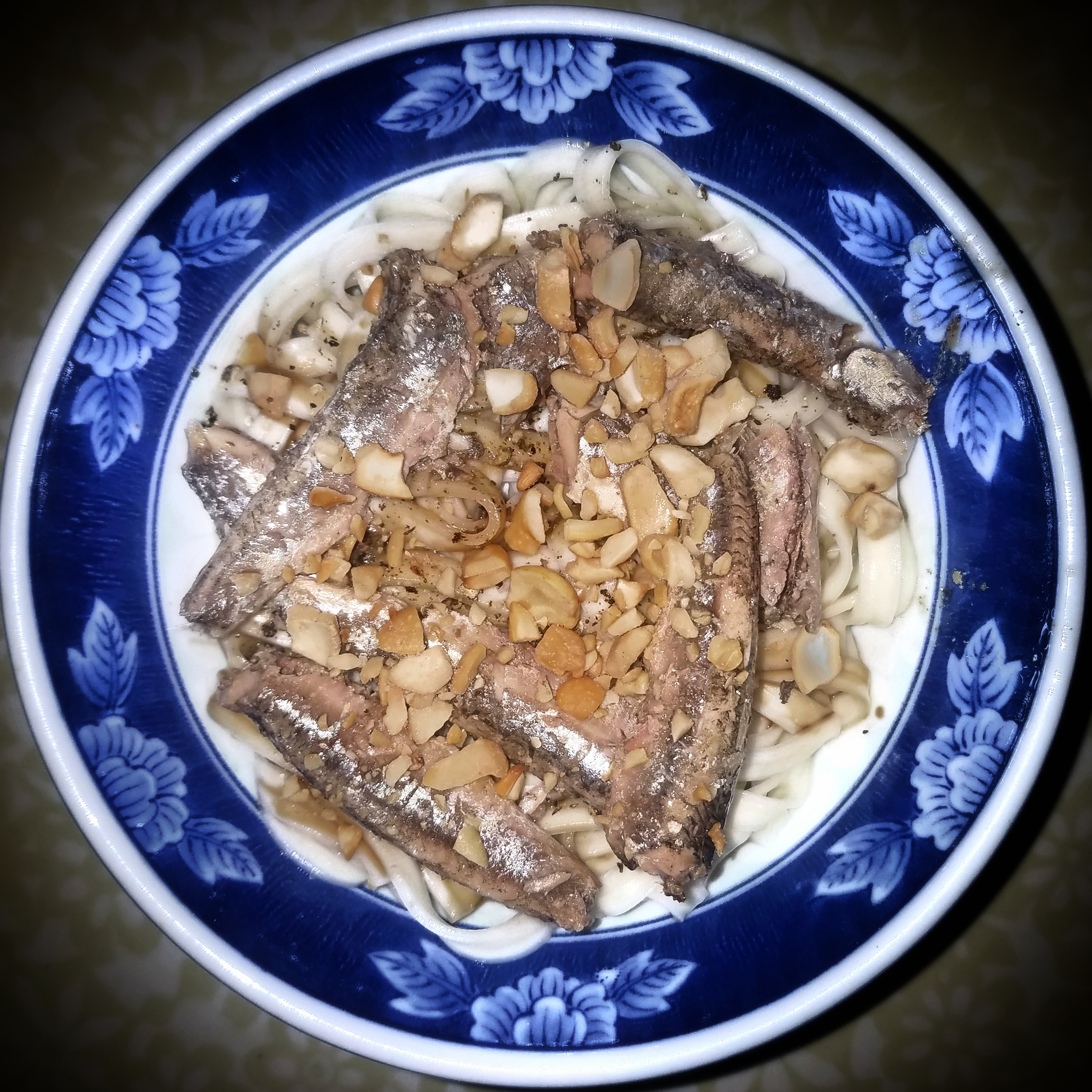
Anchovies and cashew bits on Japanese noodles

Anchovies are small, common saltwater forage fish in the family Engraulidae that are used as human food and fish bait. There are 144 species in 17 genera found in the Atlantic, Indian, and Pacific Oceans. Anchovies are usually classified as oily fish. They are small, green fish with blue reflections due to a silver longitudinal stripe that runs from the base of the caudal fin. They range from 2 centimetres (0.79 in) to 40 centimetres (16 in) in adult length, and the body shape is variable, with more slender fish in northern populations.

A traditional method of processing and preserving anchovies is to gut and salt them in brine, allow them to cure, and then pack them in oil or salt. This results in the characteristic strong flavor associated with anchovies, and their flesh turns deep grey. Anchovies pickled in vinegar, as with Spanish boquerones en vinagre, are milder, and the flesh retains a white color. For domestic use, anchovy fillets are sometimes packed in oil or salt in small tins or jars, sometimes rolled around capers. Anchovy paste is also available, as is anchovy essence.

They are used in small quantities to flavor many dishes. Because of the strong flavor of anchovies, they are also an ingredient in several sauces, including Worcestershire sauce, remoulade and many fish sauces, and in some versions of Café de Paris butter. Anchovies are a popular pizza topping in some places. In Roman times, anchovies were the base for the fermented fish sauce garum. Garum had a sufficiently long shelf life for long-distance commerce and was produced in industrial quantities. Anchovies were also eaten raw as an aphrodisiac.

Additionally, fishermen use anchovies as fish bait for larger fish, such as tuna and sea bass.

== Preparation and marketing ==
The strong taste people associate with anchovies is due to the curing process. Fresh anchovies, known in Italy as alici, have a much milder flavor. The rare alici (anchovies - in the local dialect: "Sardoni barcolani") from the Gulf of Trieste near Barcola, which are only caught at Sirocco, are particularly sought after because of their white meat and special taste and fetch high prices for fishermen.

In Sweden and Finland, the name anchovies is related strongly to a traditional seasoning. Hence, the product "anchovies" is normally made of sprats, while fish such as herring can be sold as "anchovy-spiced", leading to confusion when translating recipes.

The European anchovy, Engraulis encrasicolus, is the main commercial anchovy, with Morocco being the largest supplier of canned anchovies. The anchovy industry along the coast of Cantabria, initiated in Cantabria by Sicilian salters in the mid-19th century, now dwarfs the traditional Catalan salters.

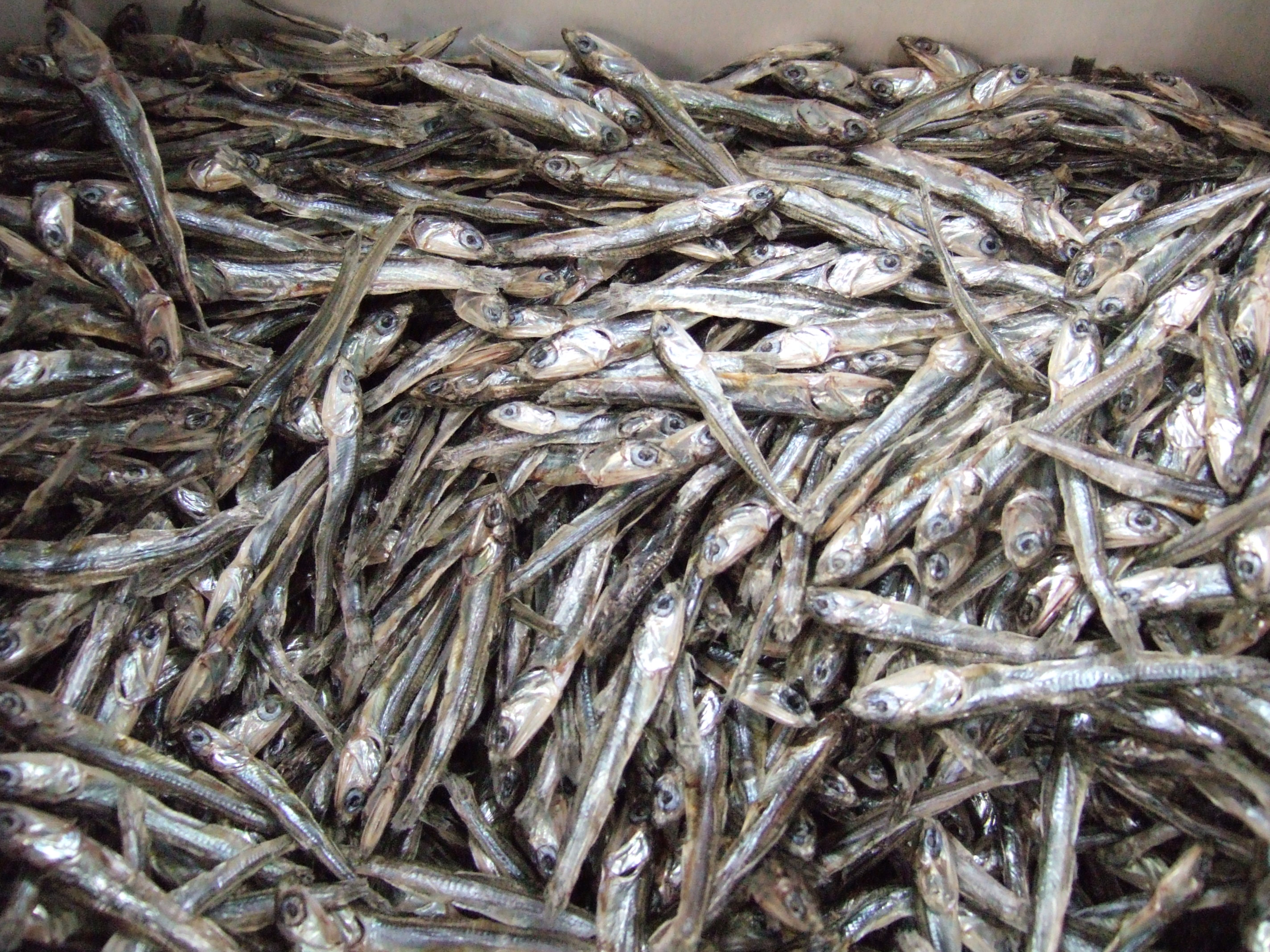
Dried Japanese anchovy

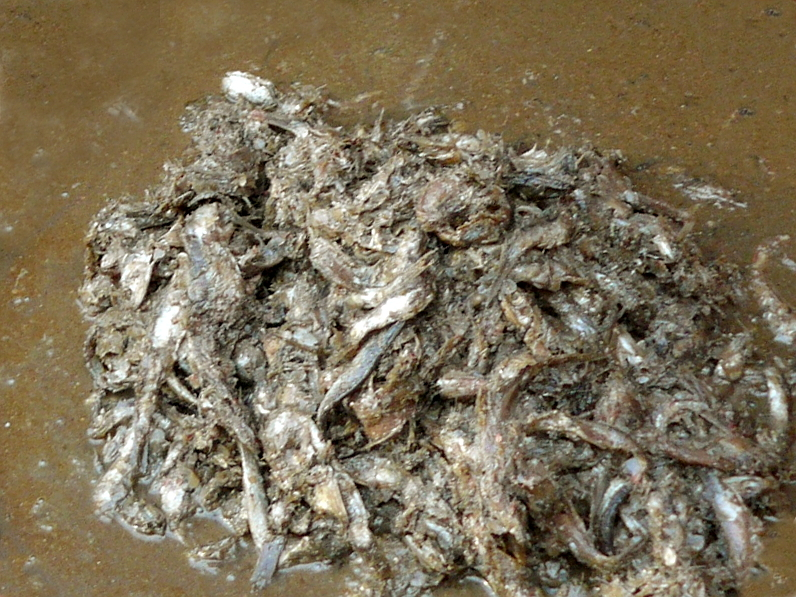
Salted and fermented anchovy (jeotgal) Korea

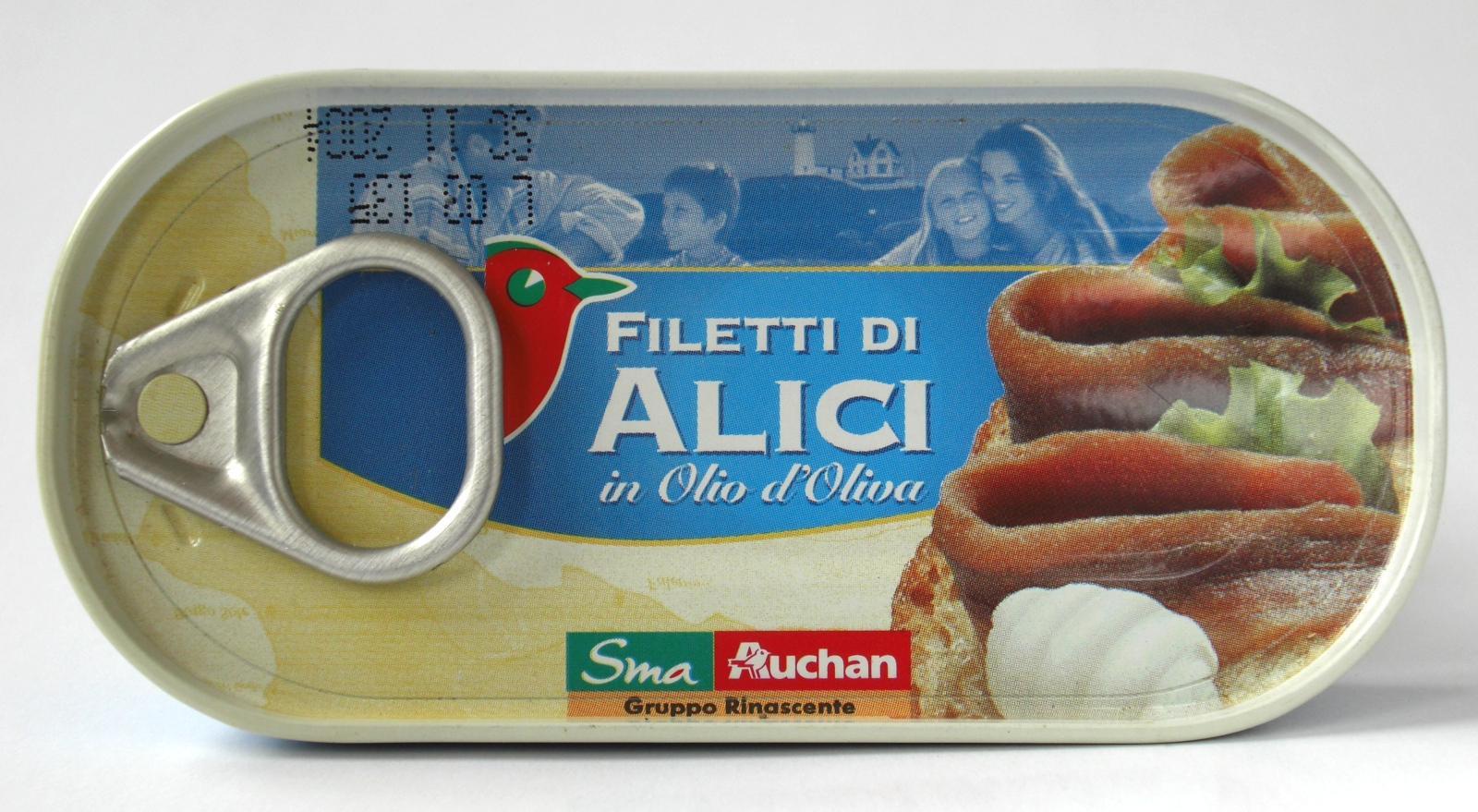
Canned anchovies

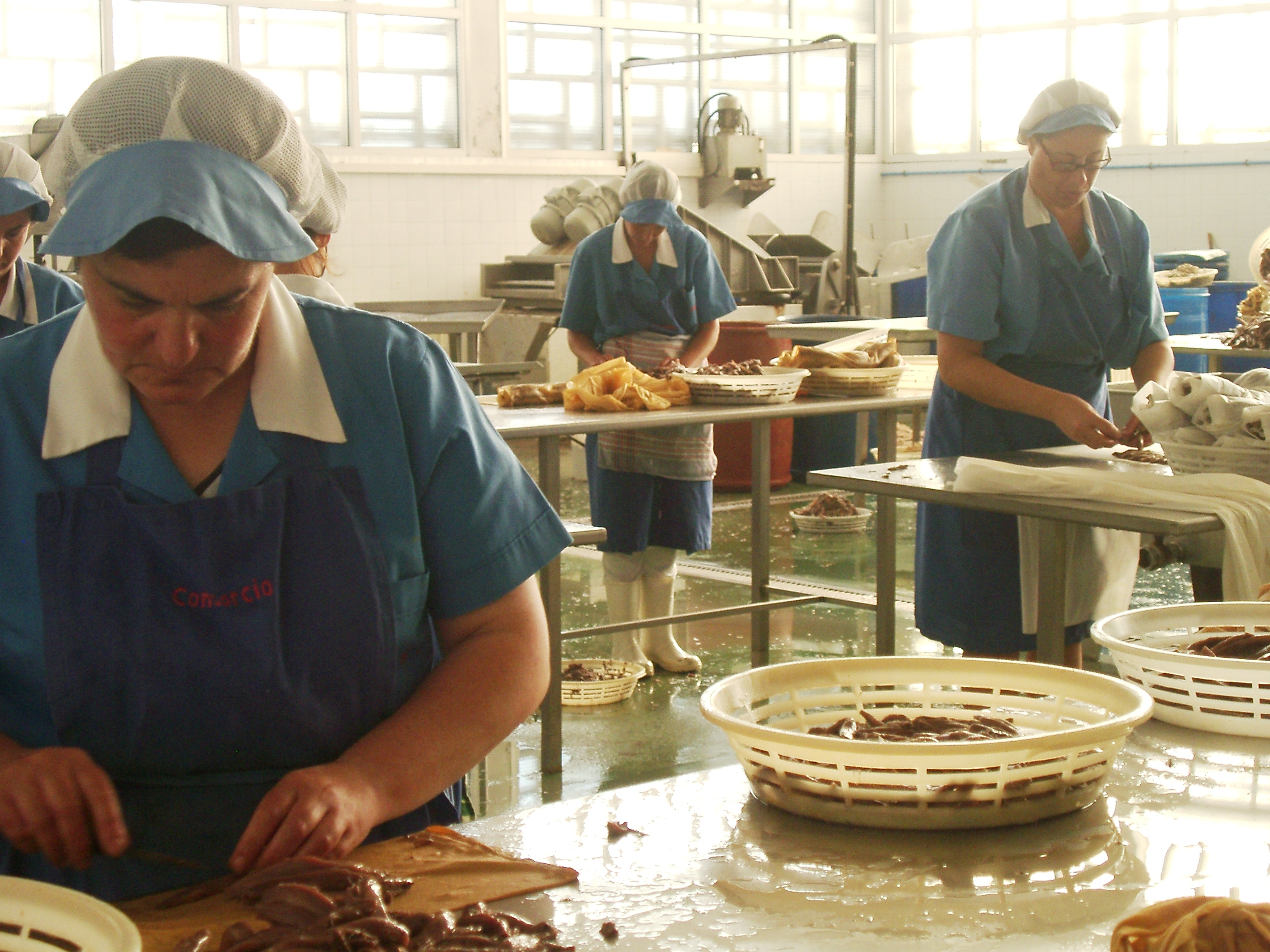
Workers handling anchovies in a canning company in Cantabria, Spain

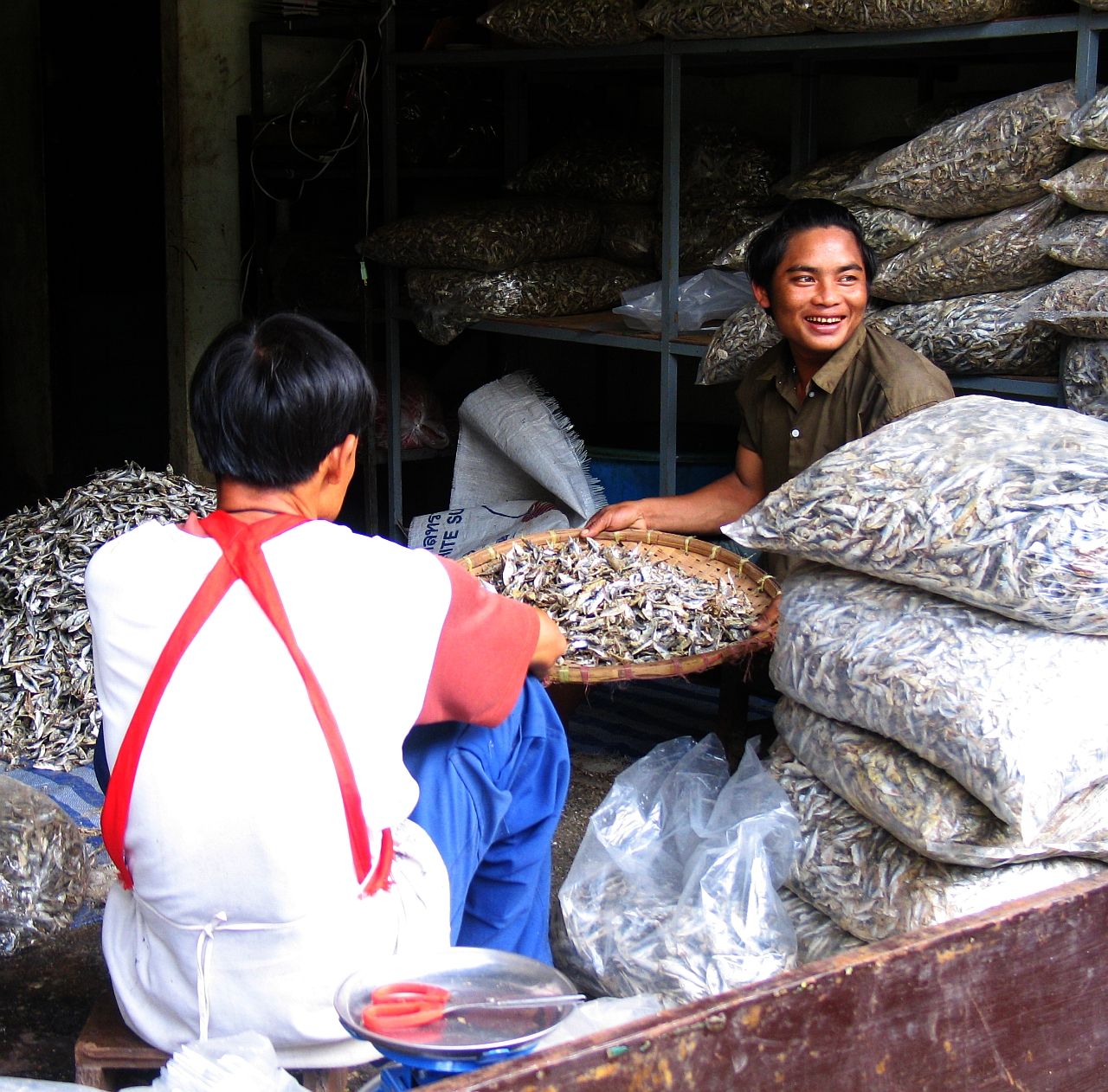
Workers cleaning dried anchovies at a market in Mae Sot, Thailand

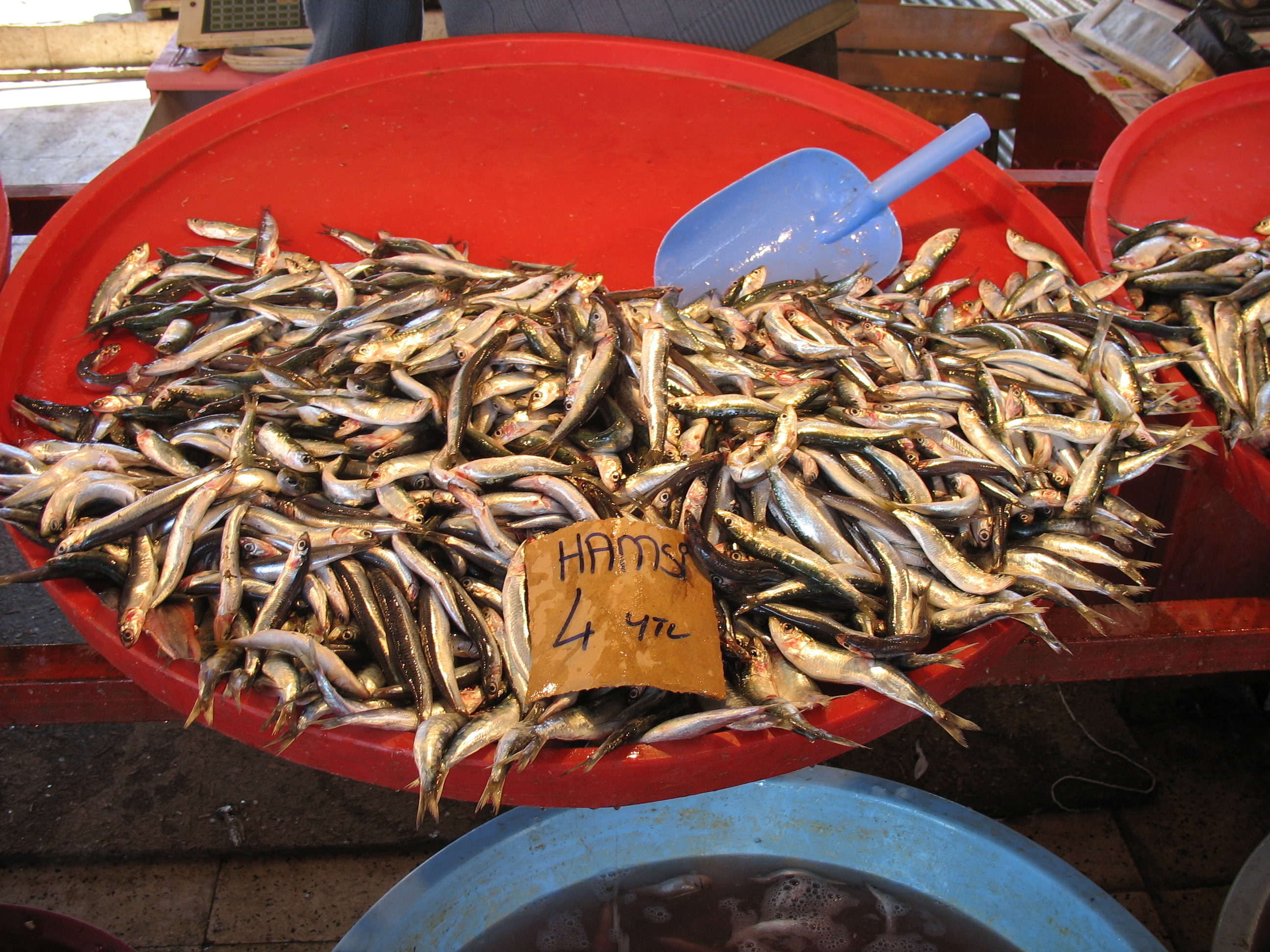
Anchovy at the market, Turkey

== Uses ==
In English-speaking countries, alici are sometimes called "white anchovies", and are often served in a weak vinegar marinade, a preservation method associated with the coastal town of Collioure in southwest France. The white fillets (a little like marinated herrings) are sold in heavy salt, or the more popular garlic or tomato oil and vinegar marinade packs.

In Spain they are called "bocarte" when consumed as freshly cooked fish, "anchoa" when salted and commonly sold in cans and "boquerón" when marinated in vinegar and very commonly consumed as snack or appetizer. (Engraulidae)

In Southeast Asian countries, anchovies are known as ikan teri in Indonesia, ikan bilis or setipinna taty in Malaysia (ikan being the Malay word for fish); and dilis, gurayan, monamon, guno or bolinaw in the Philippines. They are usually sold dried, but are also popularly used in fermented condiments like the Philippine bagoong and Malaysian budu. Ikan bilis is normally used in a similar way to dried shrimp in Malaysian cuisine. In Indonesia, Malaysia, the Philippines and Singapore anchovies are commonly used to make fish stock or are deep fried. Anchovies are also popular ingredients for the traditional Javanese sambal.

In Vietnam, anchovy is the main ingredient in the fish sauce – nước mắm – the unofficial national sauce of Vietnam. In Thai cuisine, dried anchovies are called pla katak haeng. They are used in a variety of dishes and especially popular deep-fried as a snack. Similarly to Vietnamese fish sauce, Thai fish sauce (nam pla) is also often made from anchovies. In other parts of Asia, such as Korea and Japan, sun-dried anchovies are used to produce a rich soup similar to setipinna taty. These anchovy stocks are usually used as a base for noodle soups or traditional Korean soups. There are many other variations on how anchovies are used in Korea.

Fresh and dried anchovies are a popular part of the cuisine in Kerala and other south Indian states, where they are referred to as netholi/chooda (and nethili in Tamil Nadu) and provide a cheap source of protein in the diet. Fresh anchovies are eaten fried or as in a spicy curry.

In Turkey, anchovies are known as hamsi and are eaten between November and March. They are generally consumed fried, grilled, steamed and pilav.

Anchovies are oftentimes used as a pizza topping.

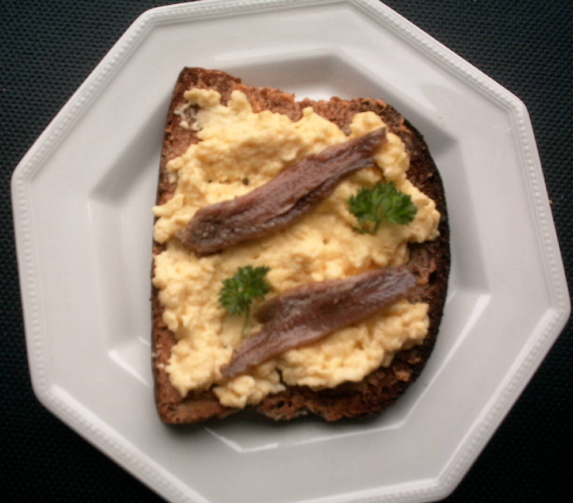
Scotch woodcock, scrambled eggs on toast spread with anchovy (United Kingdom)

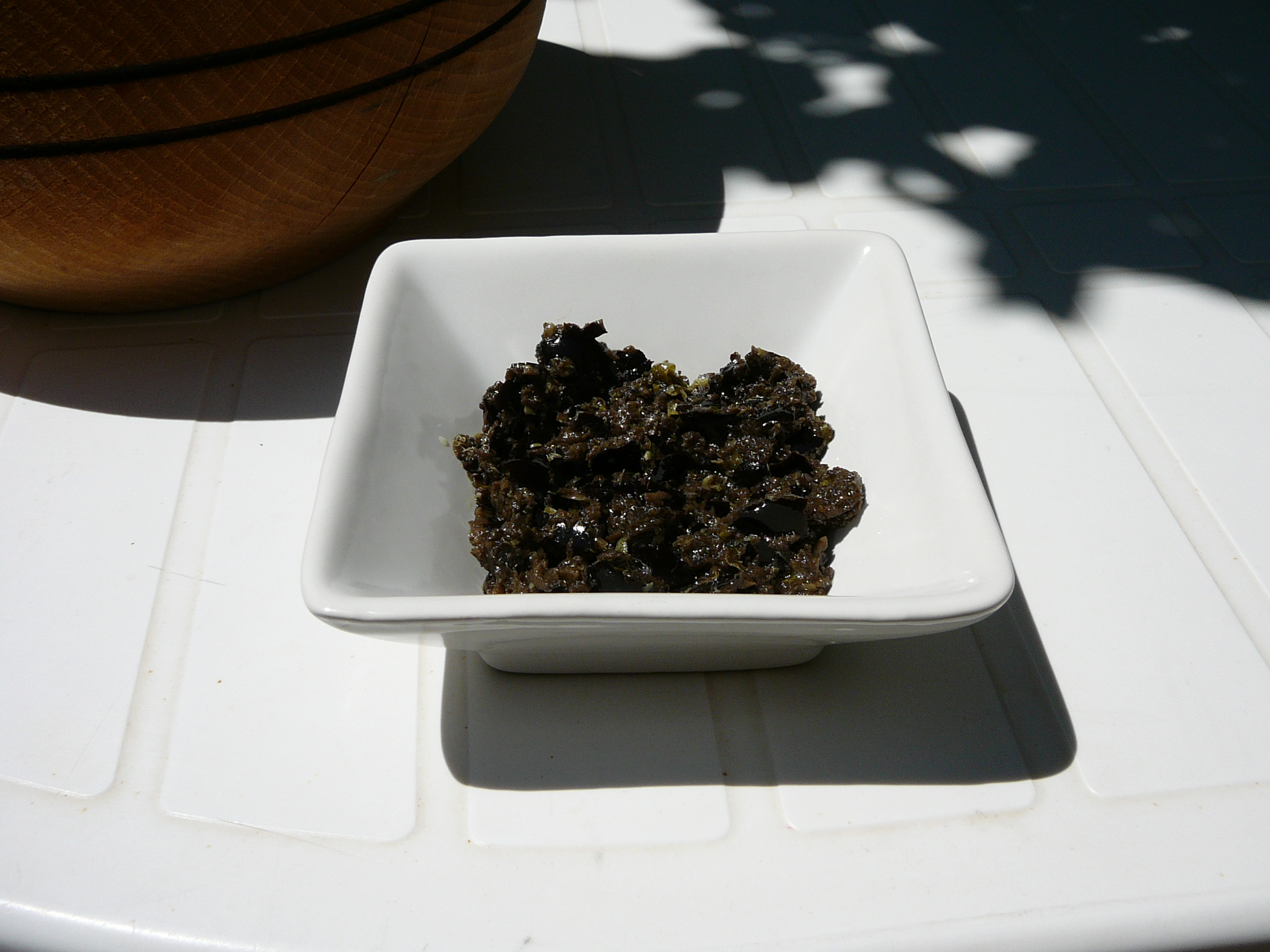
Tapenade, anchovies in olive oil with finely chopped black olives and capers (France)

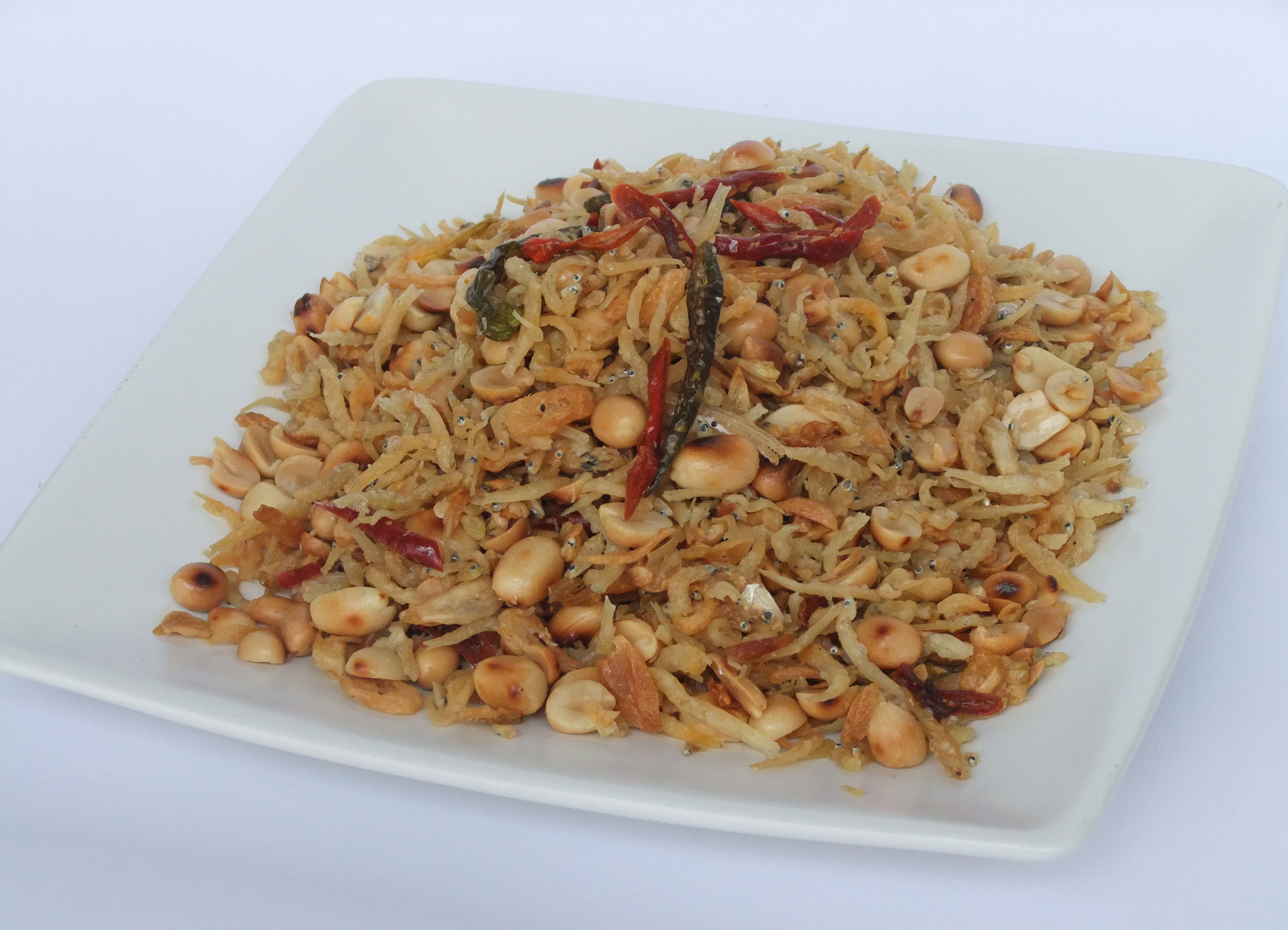
Sambal teri kacang, fried anchovies with peanuts and chili (Indonesia)

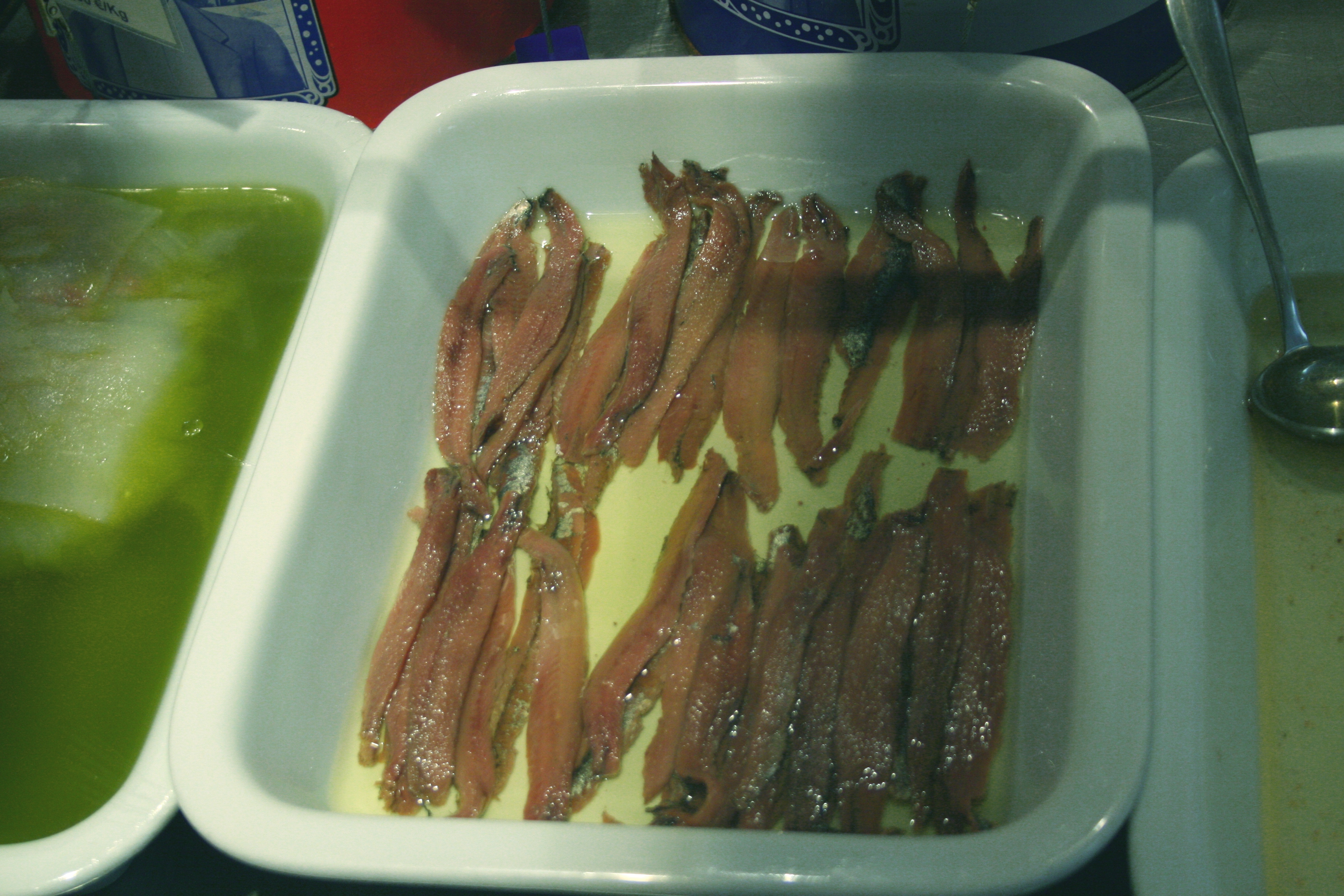
Anchoa en salazón, anchovy fillets in oil and salt (Spain)

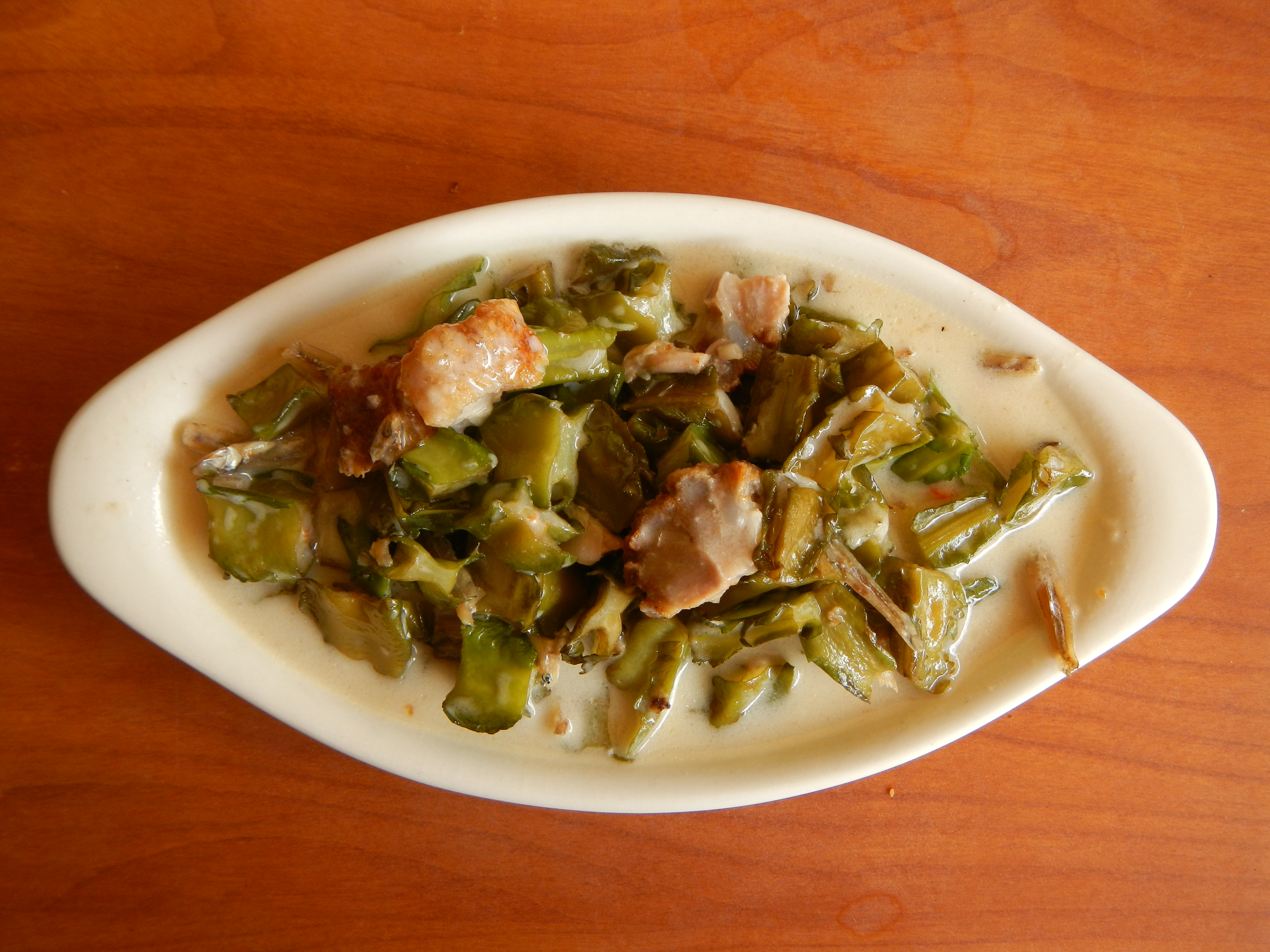
Ginataang dilis, anchovies with winged beans and pork stewed in coconut milk with spices (Philippines)

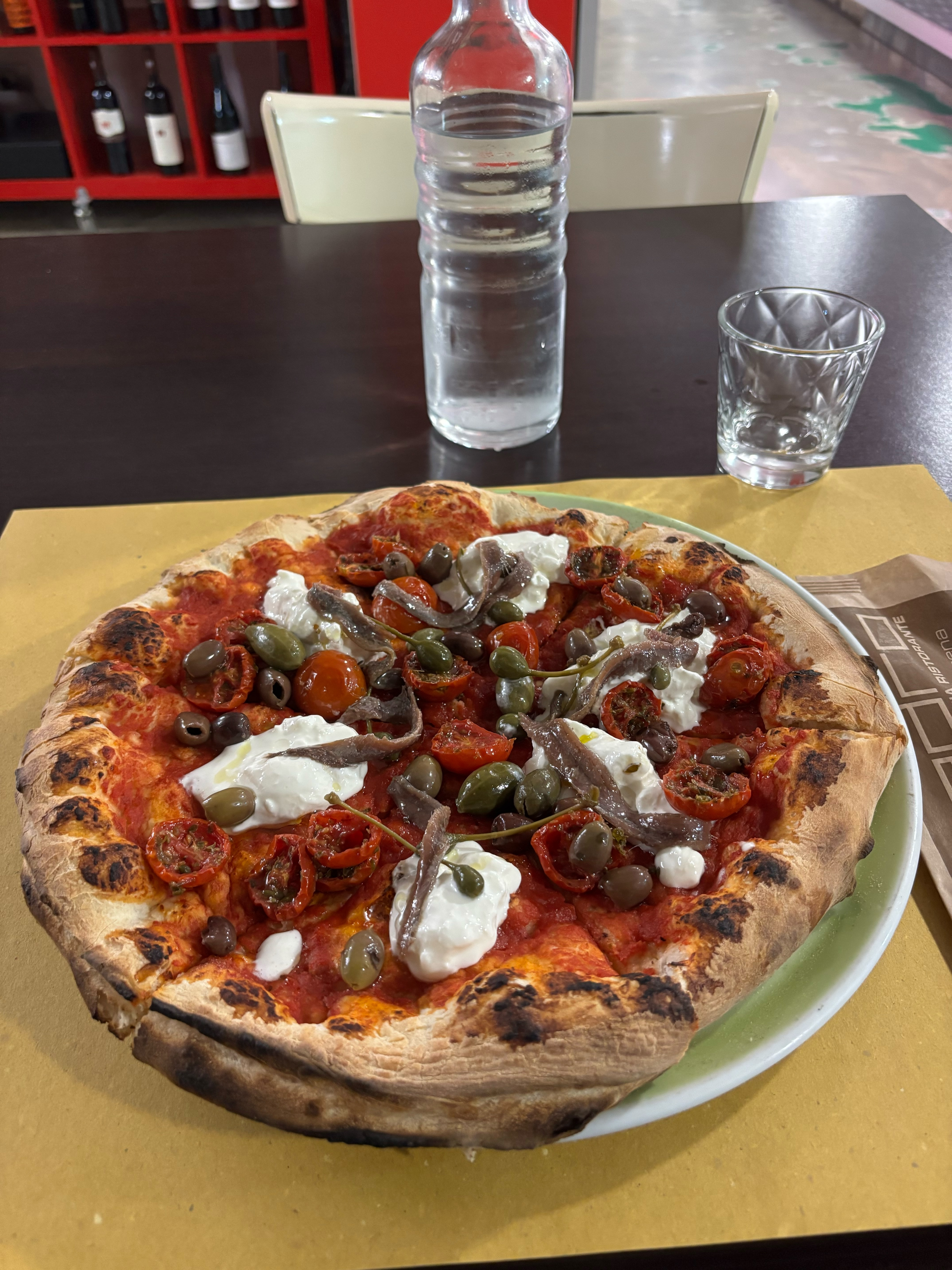
A pizza with, among other things, anchovies

== Health concerns ==
Anchovies can concentrate domoic acid in their gut which causes amnesic shellfish poisoning in humans when eaten whole. If suspected, medical attention should be sought.

== See also ==
- Bagnun
- Bagna càuda
