= Colatura di alici =

Italian fish sauce made from anchovies fermented in brine

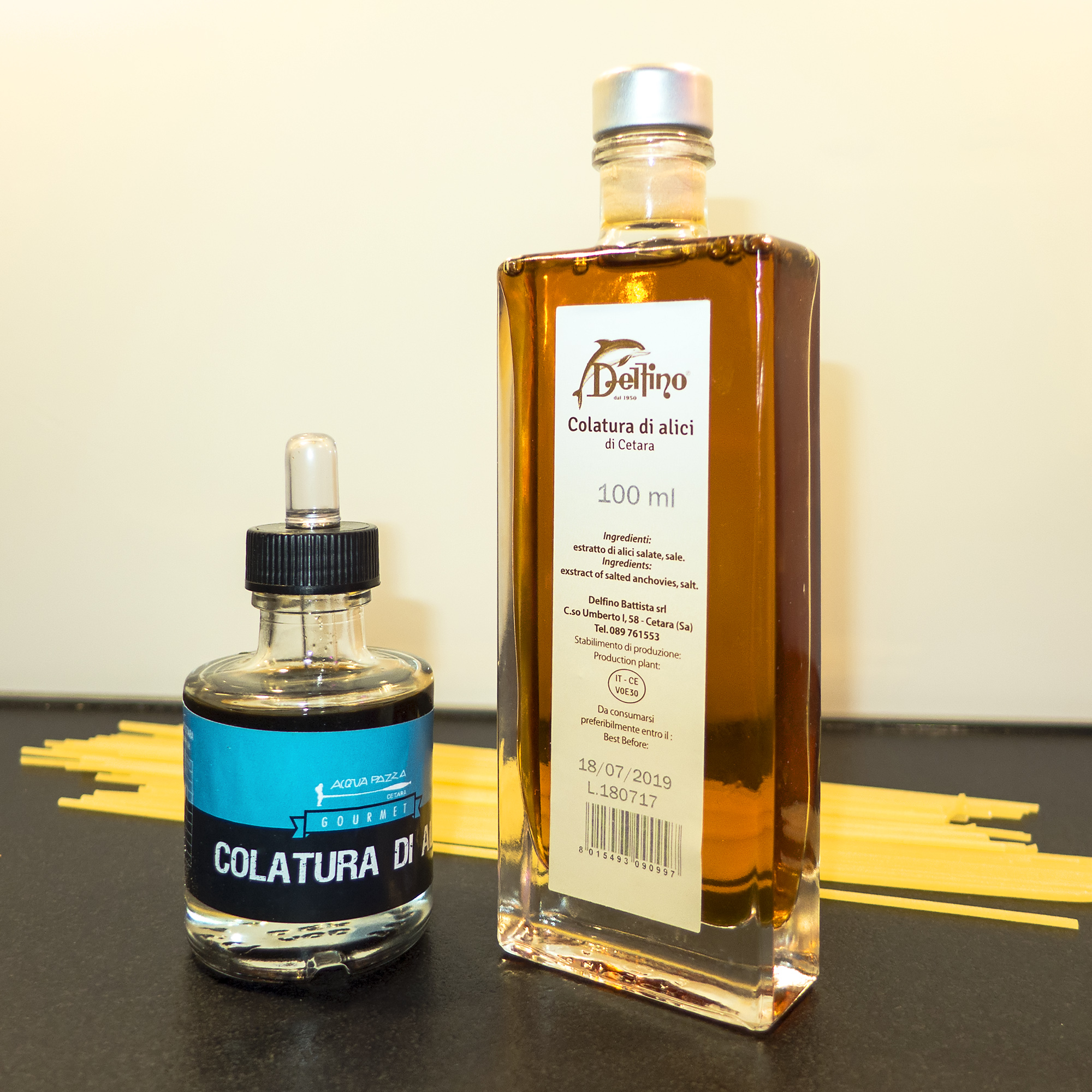
Colatura di alici

Colatura di alici (Italian: [kolaˈtuːra di aˈliːtʃi]; lit. 'anchovy drippings') is an Italian fish sauce made from anchovies, from the small fishing village of Cetara, Campania. The sauce is a transparent, amber-colored liquid produced by fermenting salted anchovies inside small chestnut barrels called terzigni. The fish used in the sauce are harvested from the Amalfi Coast between March 25 (Annunciation) and July 22 (Feast of Mary Magdalene). Colatura di alici was granted Protected Designation of Origin status in 2020.

== History ==
The origins of colatura di alici date back to ancient Rome, where a similar sauce known as garum was widely used as a condiment. The recipe for garum was recovered by a group of medieval monks, who would salt anchovies in wooden barrels every August, allowing the fish sauce to drip away through the cracks of the barrels over the course of the process. Eventually the process spread across the region and was perfected by using wool sheets to filter the fish sauce. One common way this fish sauce has been used is in a dish called spaghetti alla colatura di alici, which includes very small amounts of the fish sauce with spaghetti, garlic, and olive oil.

== See also ==
Media related to Colatura di alici di Cetara at Wikimedia Commons

- List of fish sauces
- Myeolchi-jeot – Korean salted and fermented anchovies
