= Anchovy essence =

Spiced fish sauce

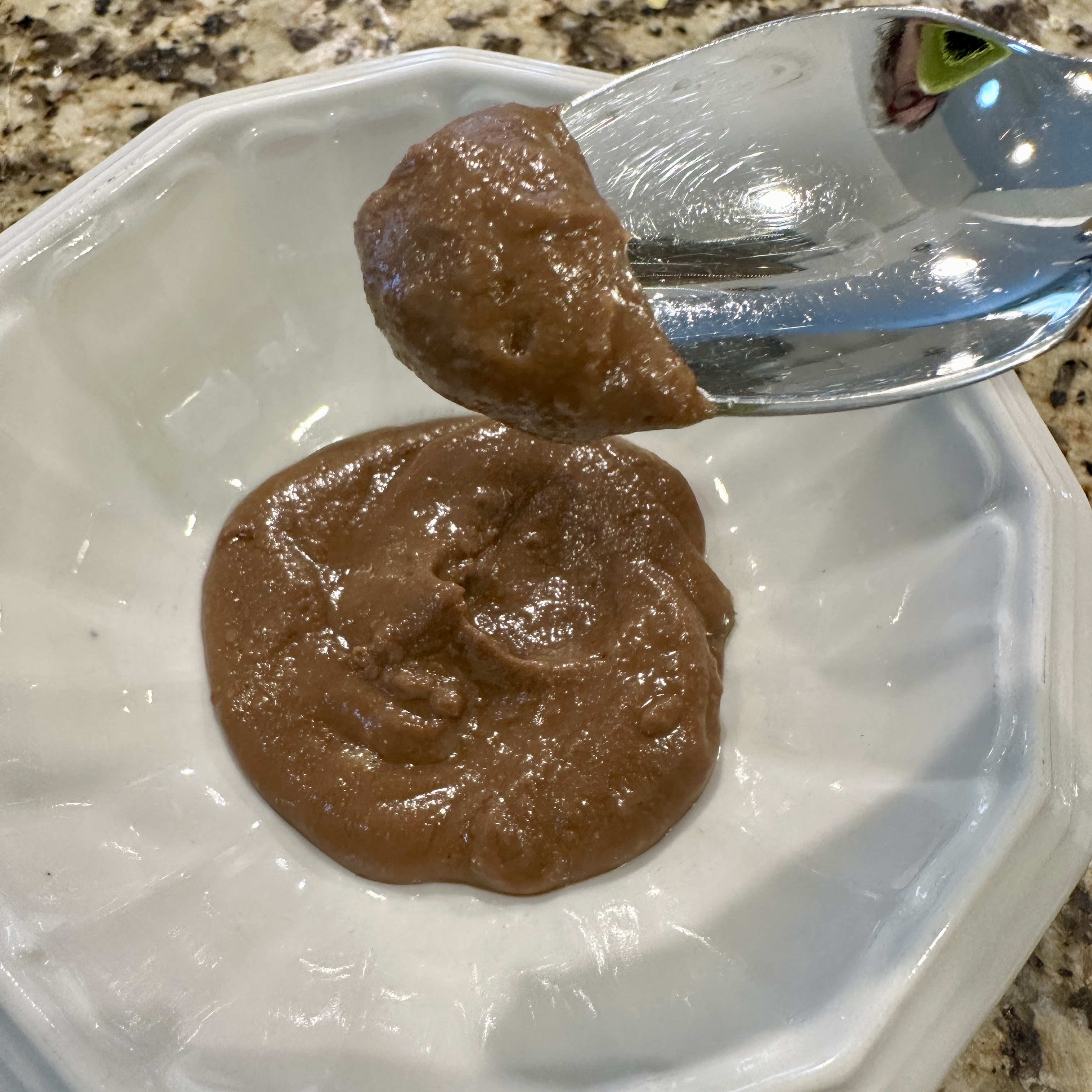
Homemade anchovy essence

Anchovy essence is a brown or pink, thick, oily sauce, consisting of pounded anchovies, spices such as black pepper or cayenne pepper, and sometimes wine. It is used as a flavoring for soups, sauces, and other dishes since at least the 19th century. It has been called a British equivalent of Asian fish sauce.

== See also ==
- Anchovy paste – Food product
- Myeolchi-jeot – Korean salted and fermented anchovies
- List of fish sauces
- List of sauces
- Gentleman's Relish
- British cuisine
