= Myeolchi-jeot =

Korean salted and fermented anchovies

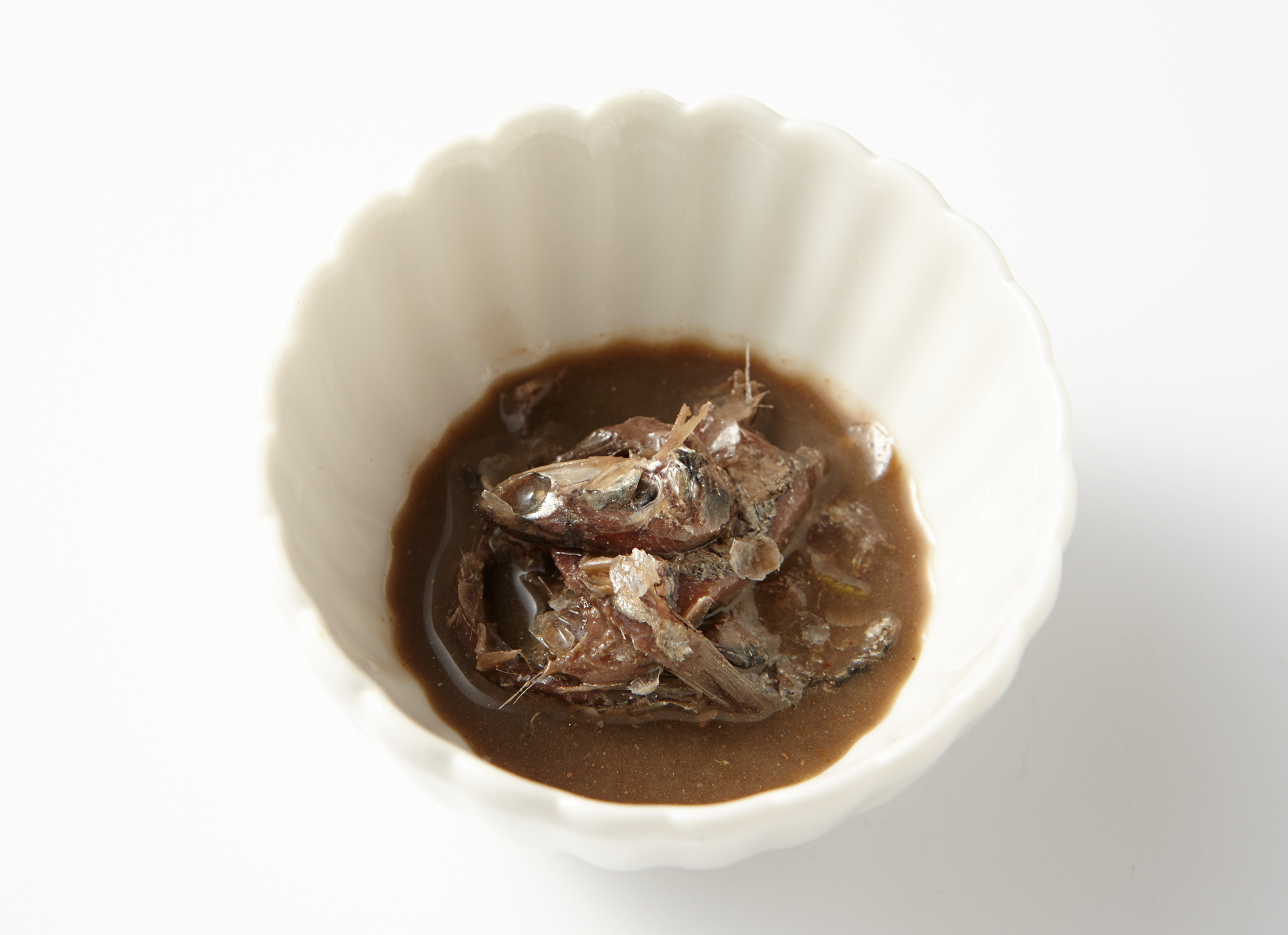
- Alternative names: Meljeot, salted anchovies
- Type: Jeotgal
- Place of origin: Korea
- Main ingredients: Anchovies

Korean name
- Hangul: 멸치젓
- RR: myeolchijeot
- MR: myŏlch'ijŏt
- IPA: [mjʌl.tɕʰi.dʑʌt̚]

Myeolchi-jeot (Korean: 멸치젓) or salted anchovies is a variety of jeotgal (salted seafood), made by salting and fermenting anchovies. Along with saeu-jeot (salted shrimps), it is one of the most commonly consumed jeotgal in Korean cuisine. In mainland Korea, myeolchi-jeot is primarily used to make kimchi, while in Jeju Island, meljeot (멜젓; myeolchi-jeot in Jeju language) is also used as a dipping sauce. The Chuja Islands, located between South Jeolla and Jeju, are famous for producing the highest quality myeolchi-jeot.

== Names and etymology ==
Myeolchi-jeot (멸치젓) is a compound of myeolchi (멸치), the Korean word for anchovy (Engraulis japonicus), and jeot (젓), the word meaning salted fermented seafood. Meljeot (멜젓) is also a compound, consisting of mel (멜), the Jeju name for anchovy, and jeot. The Jeju word mel is cognate with the first syllable myeol of the Korean word myeolchi, whose second syllable -chi is a suffix attached to fish names. Similar forms to meljeot also occur in mainland Korean dialects, including metjeot (멧젓) and mitjeot (밋젓) in Gyeongsang dialect.

== Preparation ==
The anchovies for Myeolchi-jeot are harvested along the southern coasts of the Korean Peninsula en masse. Myeolchi-jeot used in the process called gimjang are prepared with mature anchovies known as osari-myeolchi (flood tide anchovies), which are harvested in July and August. On Jeju Island, bigger anchovies harvested in the spring along the coasts of Seogwipo are made into meljeot.

Cleaned fresh anchovies are drained on sokuri (bamboo baskets), and salted with coarse salt weighing 15‒20% of the anchovies. In an onggi (earthenware jar), the anchovies and salt are put in layers, with the uppermost layer being a thick layer of salt, to prevent the anchovies from coming in contact with the air. The jar is sealed, and the salted anchovies are then allowed to ferment at 15–20 °C (59–68 °F) for two to three months in onggi (earthenware jars). Once the myeolchi-jeot has aged another couple of months, it becomes myeolchi-jeot-guk (anchovy extract).

== Culinary use ==
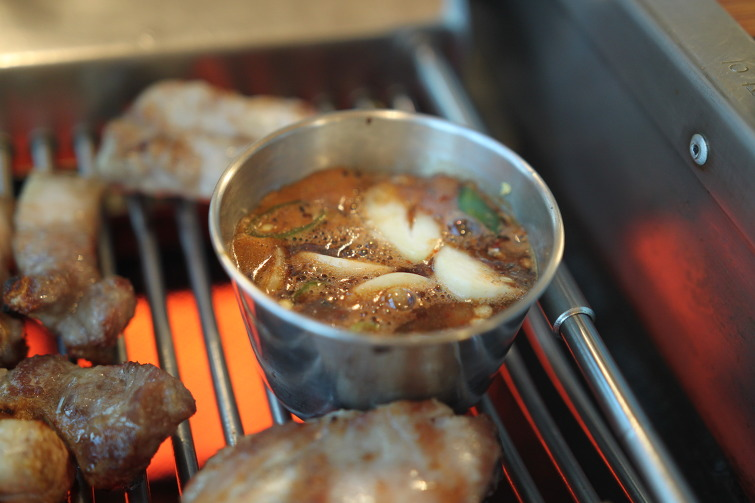
Meljeot (salted anchovies) as a dipping sauce for grilled ogyeopsal (pork belly)

The liquid extract, made after around six months of fermentation of myeolchi-jeot, is filtered and boiled to be used in kimchi. Alternatively, two parts myeolchi-jeot can be mixed with one part water, boiled over high heat, filtered, let set, and the upper, clear layer is used in kimchi. The boiled and filtered myeolchi-jeot liquid may also used to flavor seaweed dishes. Myeolchi-jeot made with boned anchovies are seasoned and eaten as banchan (side dish).

In Geomun Island, where it is difficult to grow soybeans, the remaining solids and cloudy lower layer of liquid after extracting the clear, upper liquid (anchovy extract) from myeolchi-jeot is used to make myeoljang (anchovy paste).

In Jeju Island, meljeot is used as dipping sauce for grilled pork. In summer, meljeot is used in blanched soybean leaf ssam (wrap), and in winter, napa cabbage leaves are dipped in meljeot. Meljeot may also be eaten as banchan (side dish), either as is or seasoned with garlic and chili peppers.

== Gallery ==
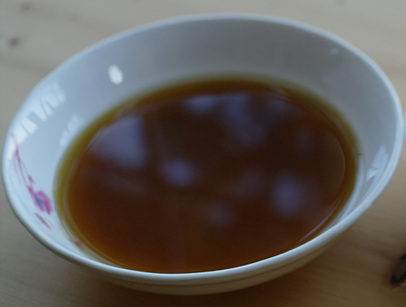
Myeolchi-aekjeot

== See also ==
- Anchovy essence – Spiced fish sauce
- Anchovy paste – Food product
- Bagoong monamon – Philippine food ingredient made by fermenting salted anchovies
- Budu – Fish sauce originating from east coast of Peninsular Malaysia
- Colatura di alici – Italian fish sauce made from anchovies fermented in brine
- Fish sauce – Condiment made from fish
