= Gentleman's Relish =

British anchovy paste

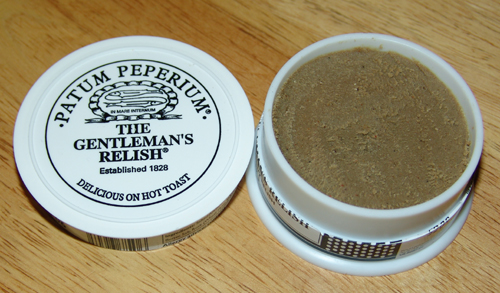
The Gentleman's Relish

Gentleman's Relish, officially Patum Peperium (a mock-Latin phrase that is supposed to mean "pepper pâté"), was a British brand of anchovy paste made to a secret recipe, created in 1828 by John Osborn. It was a savoury paste based on salted anchovies (minimum 60%) and butter, flavoured with herbs and spices. The product was manufactured by the Osborn family, then by Elsenham Quality Foods, and then by AB World Foods following a takeover. Production was discontinued in 2026 due to diminished sales. While the official recipe remained secret, recipes said to be very similar have been published, and some retailers sell their own versions.

== History ==
John Osborn, an Englishman who lived in Paris, created the paste in 1828, naming it Patum Peperium, mock Latin for "pepper pâté", which remained its official name. It was presented at the Paris Food Show in 1849, receiving the citation favorable, and brought to England by Osborn's son, where the nickname Gentleman's Relish was added to the label in the 20th century.

Patum Peperium was manufactured by the Osborn family until 1971, when the company was sold to Elsenham Quality Foods in Elsenham. They continued to use the original recipe, kept secret with no single company member knowing the full ingredients. Sales grew to approximately 750,000 pots in 2000.

Elsenham Quality Foods was taken over in 2001 by G. Costa, which was in turn acquired by AB World Foods, after which production was moved to Poland. In 2026 AB World Foods discontinued production due to dwindling sales, reportedly as low as 5% of their peak. After protests and requests to release the recipe from chefs and descendants of Osborn, AB World Foods announced that they were exploring the possibility of a third party continuing the brand.

== Recipe ==
Gentleman's Relish consisted primarily of butter and brined anchovy filets with rusk and a proprietary mix of herbs and spices. While the commercial recipe was secret, Simpson's in the Strand serves its own version which it produces in-house; Fortnum & Mason sells a version seasoned with dill, garlic and Sarawak pepper; and several recipes have been published, with flavourings including mace, cinnamon, white pepper, ginger, capers and lemon; cayenne pepper, cinnamon, white pepper, and nutmeg; and garlic, salt, chilli, and thyme.

== Uses ==
Gentleman's Relish was traditionally eaten very thinly spread on slices of hot buttered white-bread toast, either on its own or with cucumber or "mustard and cress" sprouts. It could also be added to minced meat for a different-tasting pie or to the mixture for fish cakes, potato cakes and croquettes. It could also be melted into scrambled eggs or used as a topping for jacket potatoes. It was traditionally an ingredient in Scotch woodcock. In the Victorian and Edwardian eras and later at gentlemen's clubs, its saltiness made it a standard ingredient in "savouries", small, salty dishes served as a palate cleanser and aid to digestion after dessert. Mrs. Beeton's Book of Household Management described it as "an excellent bonne bouche which enables gentlemen at wine-parties to enjoy their port with redoubled gusto".

== Variations ==
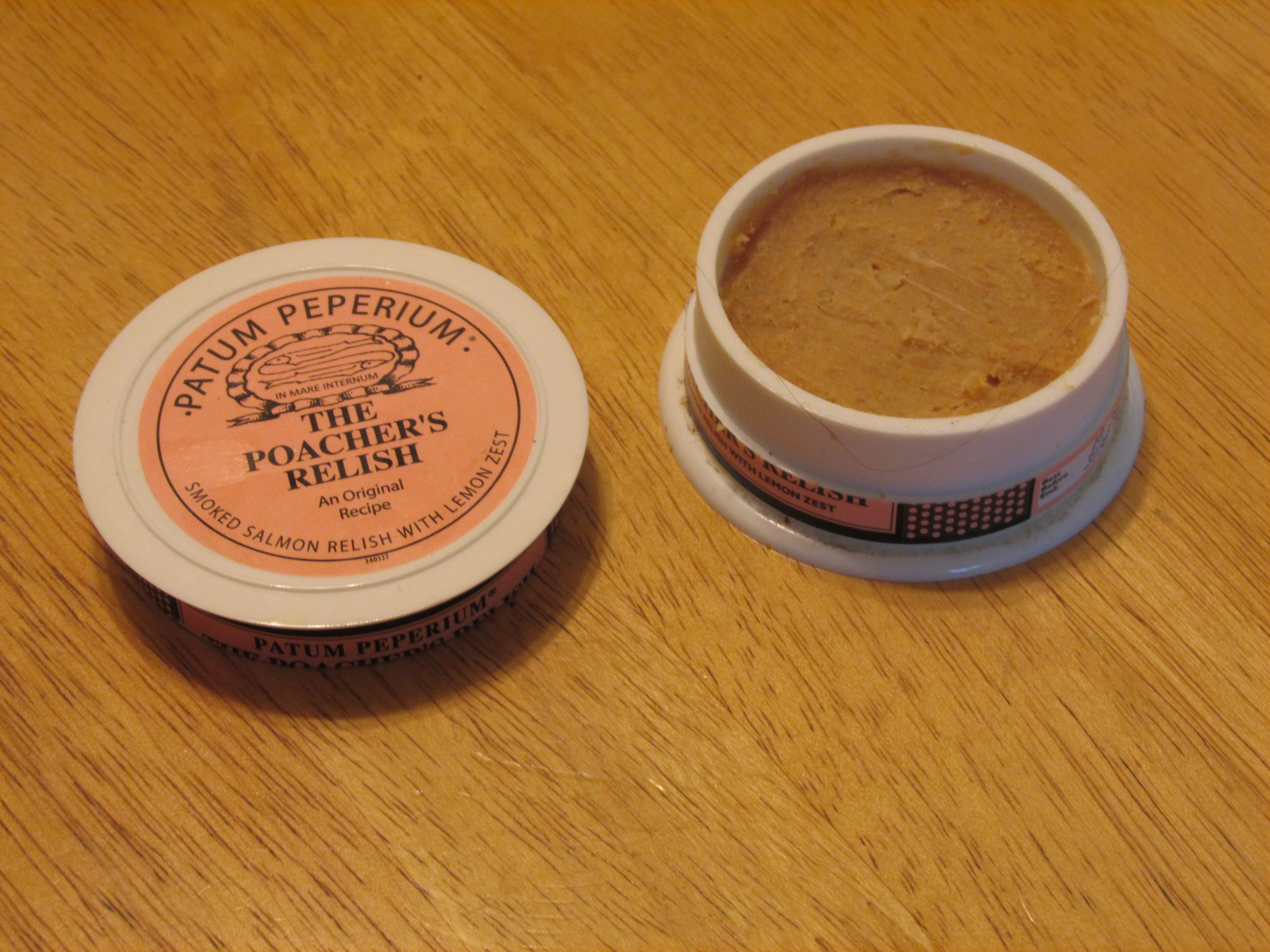
The Poacher's Relish

In 1998 Elsenham Quality Foods introduced Poacher's Relish, made from smoked salmon and butter seasoned with spices and lemon zest, and Angler's Relish, made from smoked mackerel, salted butter, lemon juice, vinegar, spices and other ingredients. These are packaged similarly to Gentleman's Relish, in plastic containers and alternatively in more expensive but reusable and decorative traditional ceramic pots.

== In popular culture ==
Gentleman's Relish is mentioned as part of a sumptuous breakfast in Evelyn Waugh's Vile Bodies, and is featured in Ian Fleming's For Your Eyes Only, where it is eaten by the Havelocks, an elderly British couple who are friends of M, and are living in Jamaica before they are murdered. It also appears in the Two Fat Ladies episode 'Afternoon Tea' where Jennifer Paterson uses Gentleman's Relish to make what she describes as "gentlemen's savoury delights".

== See also ==
- Garum
- List of brand name condiments
- Relish
