= Anchovy paste =

Food product

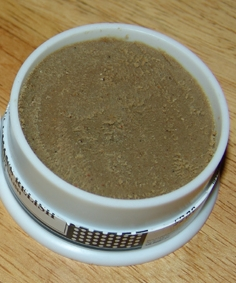
An open pot of Gentleman's Relish anchovy paste

Anchovy paste is a fish paste food product prepared using anchovies as a primary ingredient. It is used as a condiment and as an ingredient in various dishes, such as Scotch woodcock, and is a mass-produced product. It has been used for centuries to provide flavor to foods and as a source of nutrients, and it is a part of the cuisines of Great Britain, Italy, the Philippines and Vietnam. It is a major export product of Morocco.

== Overview ==
Anchovy is used as a condiment and as an ingredient in various dishes. Basic ingredients in its preparation include mashed anchovies, vinegar, spices and water, and some commercial preparations are produced using these ingredients. Butter is also sometimes used as a base ingredient, and the resultant product is sometimes referred to as "anchovy butter", and in French as beurre d'anchois.

== History ==
Anchovy paste has been used for centuries as a source of nutrients and to provide flavour to foods. Allec, a food byproduct used as a condiment that dates to the times of classical antiquity and Ancient Rome, is the paste left over from the preparation of liquamen (a predecessor to garum prepared using various oily fish, including anchovies) that has been described as a "precursor to anchovy paste". Anchovy paste has also been described as a "descendant of garum".

== Mass production ==
Anchovy paste is mass-produced, and is sometimes produced using leftover anchovies from anchovy packing facilities that are processed, mixed with additional ingredients, and packaged into tubes. Around the early 1900s, food colouring was sometimes used in commercial preparations of the paste. Today, anchovy paste is a major export product of Morocco.

=== Notable brands ===
Gentleman's Relish was a brand of mass-produced spiced anchovy paste that was introduced in England in 1828, which was discontinued in 2026 due to declining sales.

== Use in dishes ==
Uses of anchovy paste include a condiment or ingredient in egg dishes and on toast. It can be used as an ingredient in some hors d'oeuvre. Anchovy paste is a common food in Italy, where it is used served atop canapés and vegetables and as an ingredient in sauces and pasta dishes. It is also a part of the cuisine of the Philippines, where it is referred to as bagoong balayan, and of Vietnam, where it is referred to as mắm nêm. Anchovy paste can be used as an ingredient in the preparation of anchovy sauce.

Scotch woodcock is a British savoury dish prepared using scrambled eggs atop toast that has been spread with anchovy paste or Gentleman's Relish. Whole anchovies are also sometimes used in the dish.

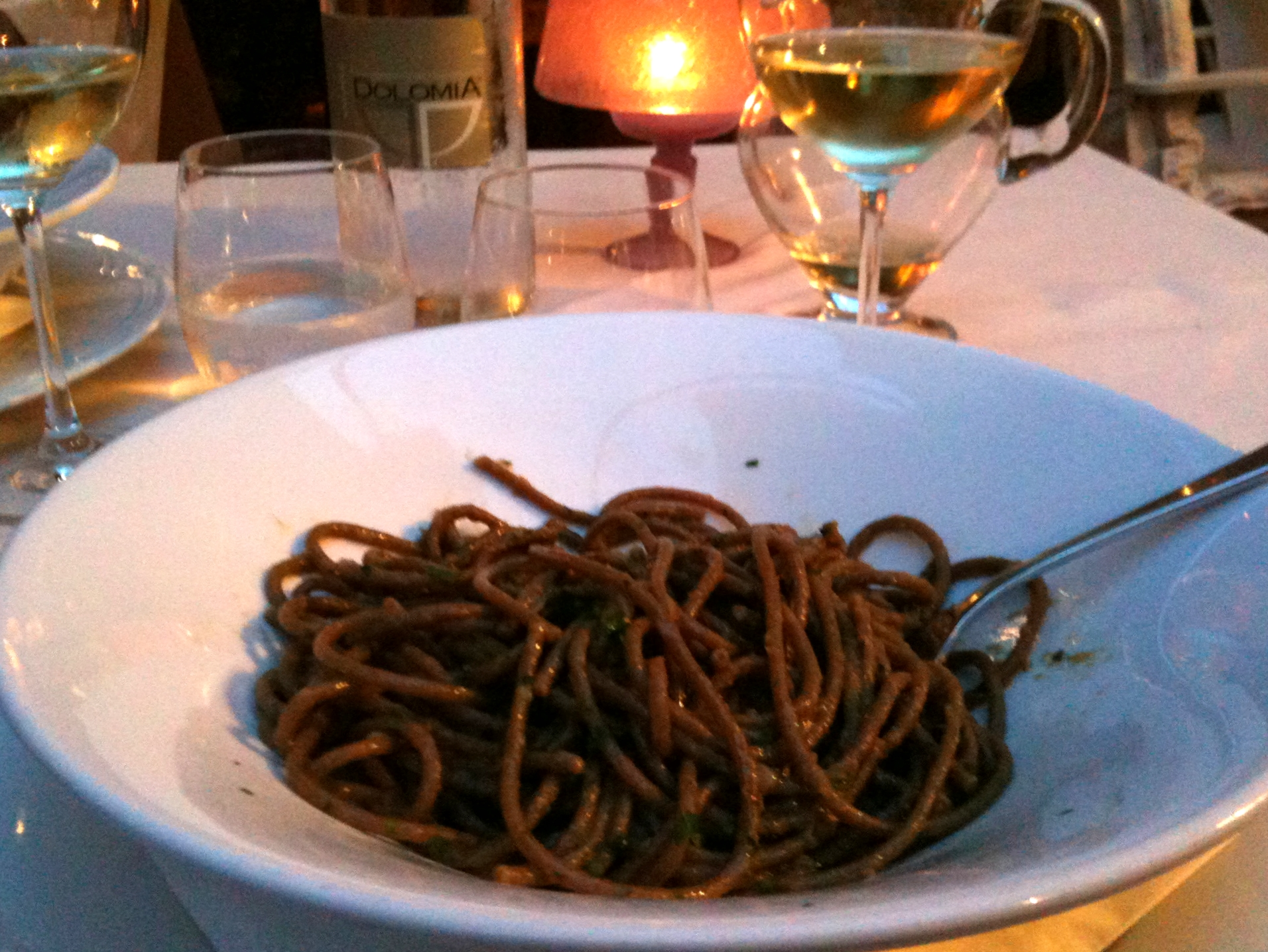
Bigoli in salsa (bigoli with anchovy sauce) at a restaurant in Venice, Italy

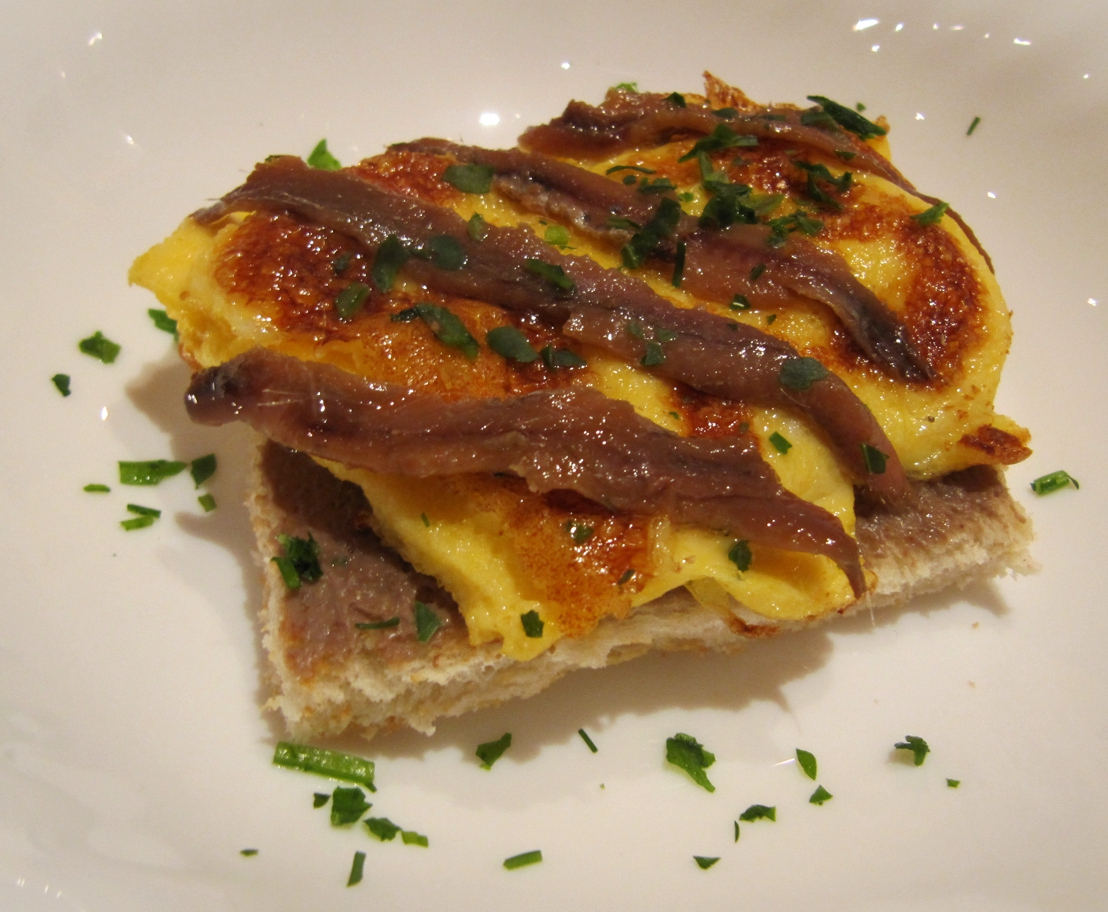
Scotch woodcock garnished with anchovy fillets and parsley. The anchovy paste is beneath the anchovy fillets.

== See also ==
- Anchovies as food – Preserved fish
- Anchovy essence – Spiced fish sauce
- Fish sauce – Condiment made from fish
- List of condiments
- Myeolchi-jeot – Korean salted and fermented anchovies
- Bagoong monamon – Philippine food ingredient made by fermenting salted anchovies
- Relish – Condiment made from cooked pickled vegetables, fruit or herbs
- Shrimp paste – Fermented condiment
