= Budu (sauce) =

Fish sauce originating from east coast of Peninsular Malaysia

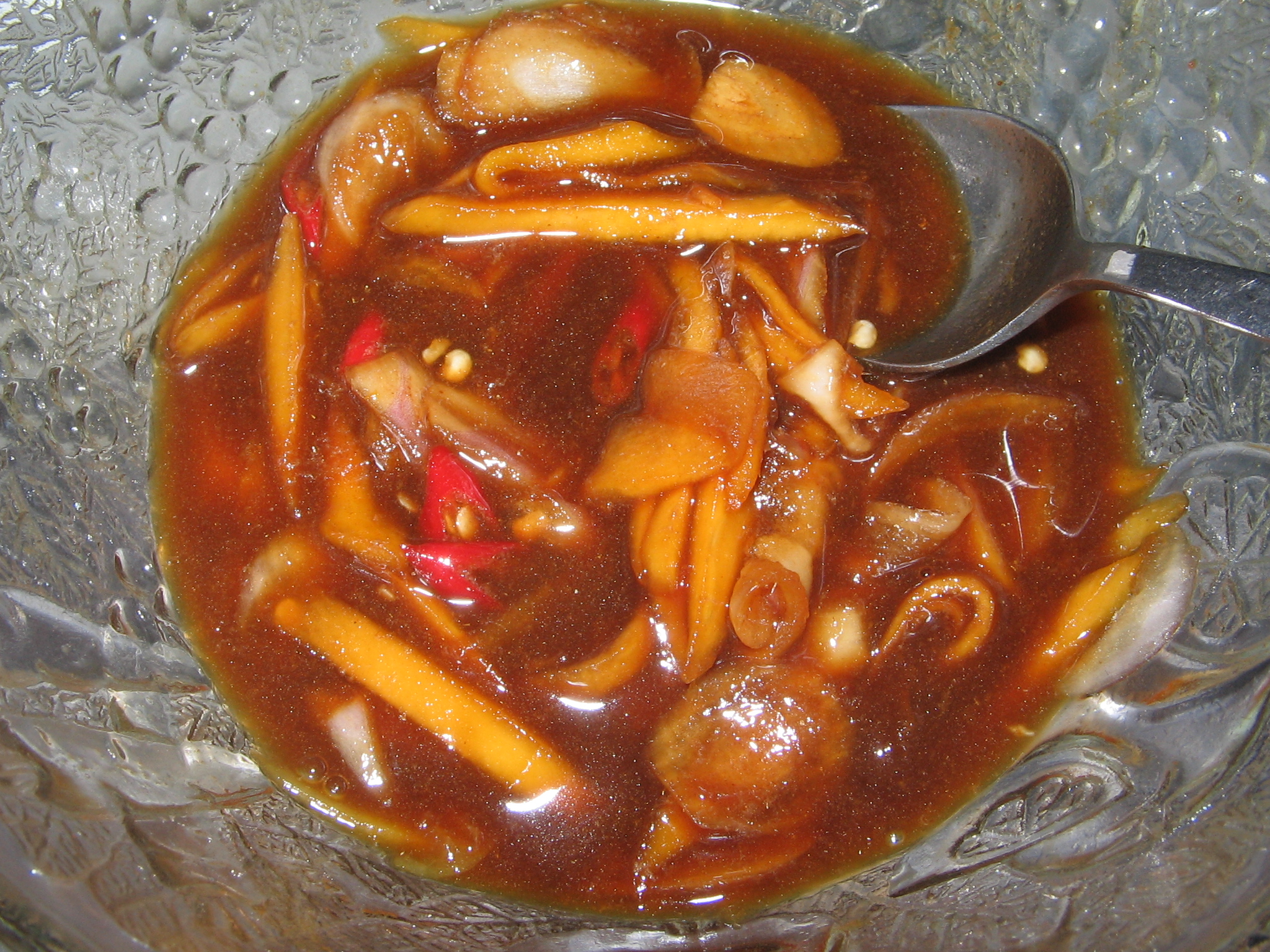
- Budu sauce
- Type: Condiment
- Region or state: Malay Peninsula (Southern Thailand and the Malaysian Pantai Timur)
- Main ingredients: Anchovy

Budu (Jawi: بودو; Thai: บูดู RTGS: budu pronounced [būːdūː], also known as น้ำบูดู nam budu) is a traditional anchovy sauce condiment made among ethnic Malays populating Thai provinces Yala, Narathiwat and Pattani plus Malaysian states of Kelantan and Terengganu altogether east coast of the Malay Peninsula, to the Natuna Islands (called pedek or pedok), South Sumatra, Bangka Island, and West Kalimantan (called rusip) in Borneo of Indonesia.

It is used as a flavouring and is normally eaten with fish, rice, and raw vegetables.

== Manufacturing ==
It is traditionally made by mixing anchovies and salt in a ratio ranging from 2:1 to 6:1 and allowing the mix to ferment for 140 to 200 days.

The fish product is the result of hydrolysis of fish and microbial proteases. The flavor and aroma of budu are produced by the action of proteolytic microorganisms surviving during the fermentation process: high amounts of glutamic acid and aspartic acid are produced contributing to its umaminess, while methylbutane compounds are responsible for its distinctive end product aroma. Palm sugar and tamarind are usually added to promote a browning reaction, resulting in a dark brown hue. The ratio of fish to salt is key to the final desired product. Different concentrations of salt influences the microbial and enzymatic activity, resulting in different flavours. The microorganisms found during budu production are generally classified as halophilic. The microorganisms play important roles in protein degradation and flavour and aroma development.

Budu has been declared a heritage food by Malaysia's Department of National Heritage. Though budu production has been a traditional profession among the Malays, some communities like the Hokkien in villages set along the Kelantan River (dubbed the 'Cina Kampung') also participate. Anchovy and its products like budu are high in protein and uric acid, thus not recommended for people with gout. The uric acid content in anchovies, however, is lower than that in tuna.

Budu made from anchovy sauce has shown potential as an anti-cancer agent. As a food sourced from fish it also has potential as brain food.

A powdered form of budu was developed by a Politeknik Kota Bharu (PKB) student in 2011. This allows for easier storage and transport as it is lighter and less prone to bottle breakage.

== History ==
It is mentioned in A Grammar and Dictionary of the Malay language, With a Preliminary Dissertation, Volume 2, By John Crawfurd, published in 1852.

It is similar to the patis in Philippines, ngapi in Burma, nuoc mam in Vietnam, ishiru or shottsuru in Japan, Colombo cure in the Indian subcontinent, yeesu in China, and aekjeot in Korea.

== See also ==
- List of dried foods
- List of fish sauces
- Myeolchi-jeot – Korean salted and fermented anchovies
