= Bagoong monamon =

Philippine food ingredient made by fermenting salted anchovies

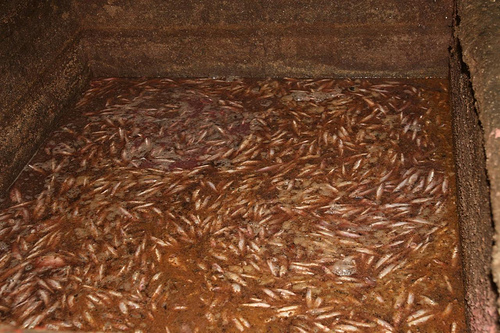
- Bagoong
- Alternative names: bagoong monamon-dilis, bagoong, and bugguong munamon
- Type: Condiment
- Region or state: Philippines
- Main ingredients: fermented anchovies

Bagoong monamon, bagoong monamon-dilis, or simply bagoong and bugguong munamon in Ilocano, is a common ingredient used in the Philippines and particularly in Northern Ilocano cuisine. It is made by fermenting salted anchovies ("monamon" or "munamon" in Ilocano) which is not designed, nor customarily used for immediate consumption since it is completely raw.

== Description ==
It is often used as a cooking ingredient, although it is also regularly used as an accompaniment to traditional food dishes. To most Westerners unfamiliar with this condiment, the smell can be repulsive. Bagoong is however, an essential ingredient in many curries and sauces.

This type of bagoong is smoother than bagoong terong, although they are similar in flavor. The odor is unique and smells strongly of fish. Fish sauce, common throughout Southeast Asian cuisine, is a by-product of the bagoong process. Known as patis, it is distinguished as the clear refined layer floating on the thicker bagoong, itself. Patis and bagoong can be interchanged in recipes, depending on personal taste and preference.

== Flavor enhancer ==
Bagoong is used as a flavor enhancing agent, in the place of salt, soy sauce, or monosodium glutamate. It is used in creating the fish stock that is the base for many Ilocano dishes, like pinakbet, or as a dressing to greens in the dish called kinilnat or ensalada.

Bagoong is also used as a condiment, in many cases, a dipping sauce for chicharon, green and ripe mangoes, or hard boiled eggs. It is similar in taste and smell to that of anchovy paste.

== Marketing ==
Bagoong munamon is marketed either with bits of fermented fish (which is often used to make flavorful soups, especially in the Ilocano "Dinengdeng;" or it can be fried for a quick meal) or without (marketed as "boneless" bagoong munamon, usually stored in bottles). Boneless bagoong, if left undisturbed for quite some time, will settle to the bottom of its container, separating the clear patis from the solids, as patis comes from bagoong.

In other areas of the Philippines, this type of bagoong can be named for the locale they came from, e.g. bagoong balayan (which is produced in the coastal town of Balayan in the Province of Batangas).

== See also ==
- Bagoong
- Bagoong terong
- Fish sauce
- Garum
- List of fermented foods
- List of fish sauces
- Myeolchi-jeot
- Mahyawa
- Padaek
- Shrimp paste
