= Bolinaw =

Bolinaw or bolinao is a common name for several species of very small fish in the Philippines, including:

- Anchovies, members of the family Engraulidae
- Neostethus thessa, a small fish endemic to Lake Mainit, Mindanao

== See also ==
- Bolinao
