= Scotch woodcock =

British savoury dish

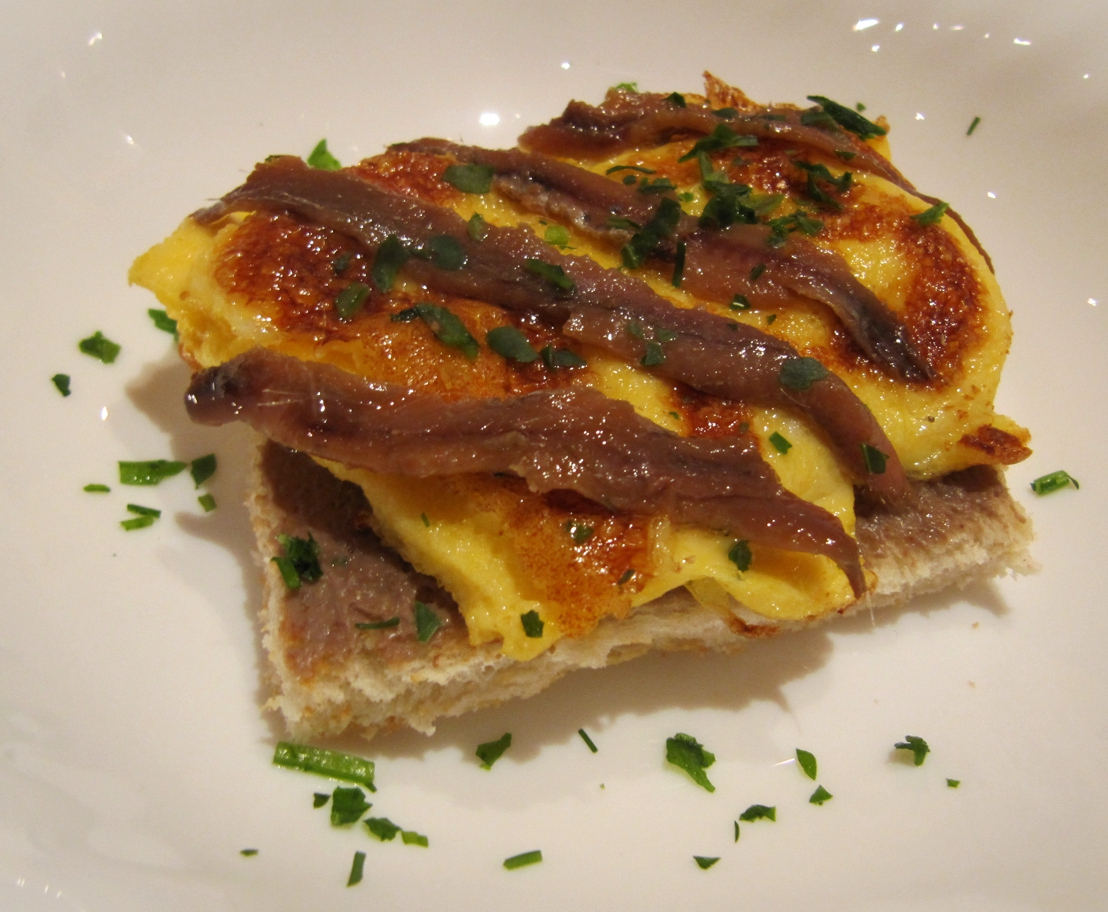
- Scotch woodcock garnished with anchovy fillets and parsley.
- Type: savoury, snack
- Place of origin: United Kingdom
- Created by: Unknown
- Main ingredients: Eggs, toast, anchovy paste

Scotch woodcock is a British savoury dish consisting of creamy, lightly-scrambled eggs served on toast that has been spread with anchovy paste or Gentleman's Relish, and sometimes topped with chopped herbs and black pepper.

Scotch woodcock was served in the refreshment rooms of the House of Commons of the United Kingdom till late 1949. It was also served historically at the colleges of the University of Cambridge and the University of Oxford, and it continues to be served at the Oxford and Cambridge Club as an alternative to sweet desserts or a cheeseboard.

It was a well-known dish in the Victorian era, and is mentioned in Mrs. Beeton's Book of Household Management.

The name is modelled on Welsh rabbit. Similar to Welsh rabbit, which contains no rabbit meat, the dish has no woodcock, a type of bird, in its ingredients at all.
