= Eliza F. Morris =

English hymnwriter

- Born: Eliza Fanny Goffe; 1821; London
- Died: 1874 (aged 52–53); Malvern Link, Worcestershire, England
- Resting place: St Mathias Church
- Occupation: hymnwriter
- Spouse: Josiah Joseph Morris (m. 1849)
- Writing career
- Genre: 19th-century British hymnody
- Notable works: "God of pity, God of grace" ("The Prayer in the Temple")
- Notable awards: prize, Band of Hope

Eliza F. Morris (née Goffe; 1821–1874) was a 19th-century English hymnwriter. She wrote several hymns, but the one in more general use than the others begins "God of pity, God of grace". Written on 4 September 1857, it was named "The Prayer in the Temple". The reference is to the prayer of Solomon at the dedication of the temple, 2 Chronicles 6, and almost his very words are used in the refrain at the end of each stanza. It was published in 1858 in The Voice and the Reply, Part II.

== Early life ==
Eliza Fanny Goffe was born in London at 10 Primrose Street, Bishopgate Street, in 1821. Her parents were Timothy Goffe (d. 1842), a tailor, and Elizabeth Jane (Judd) (b. 1797). Eliza's siblings included William, Frederick, Annie, William, Clara, Henry, and Elizabeth. Owing to delicate health, she was brought up in the country, the family having moved to Banbury, Oxfordshire.

In Banbury, in 1849, she married Josiah Joseph Morris (1821–1883), an assistant editor of a provincial paper.

== Career ==
She received a prize from the Band of Hope for a poem on "Kindness to Animals." This recognition of ability encouraged her to continue writing.

In 1858, Morris published a volume called, The Voice and the Reply (Worcester, 1858). The pieces in this volume are easy in versification, and religious in sentiment. The volume is in two parts. The first part consists of 18 pieces and gives "expression to God's utterances, whether in the still small voice of conscience, or in invitation, warning, or pity." The second part consists of 68 pieces and expresses a person's reply, and it is to this portion of the poem that the notable hymn, "The Prayer in the Temple", was included. "God of pity, God of grace." is found in the second part, entitled "The Prayer in the Temple". In the New Congregational, one verse of this is omitted, and another is changed in position. Of the hymn, Morris said:-

"There is a regular progression of Christian experience running through the volume. The Prayer in the Temple' came in due course, as one of the noblest circumstances of the godly life; it was written on the 4th September, 1857."

In 1866, Morris published Life lyrics, consisting of pieces on secular subjects treated religiously. She edited a Bible Class Hymn Book, which gained the approval of the Sunday School Union. She also wrote the words to School Harmonies, by J. Morris, published by her husband. She contributed to periodicals.

In Julian's A Dictionary of Hymnology, Rev. William Garrett Horder includes the following hymns by Morris as being in common use during her era:

1. "Come unto Me and rest" (Christ's Invitation). From The Voice and the Reply, 1858, into the 1874 Supplement to the New Congress in an altered form.
2. "God of pity, God of grace" (Lent). This hymn in Litany form appeared in Part II of The Voice and the Reply, 1858, entitled "The Prayer in the Temple." From Miller's Singers and Songs of the Church, 1869, there is a record that this hymn was written on 4 September 1857. It was in extensive use.
3. "O Thou, blest Lamb of God" (Love for and Trust in Jesus desired). From The Voice and the Reply, 1858, into the Anglican Hymn Book, 2nd edition, 1871.

== Death and legacy ==
Eliza Fanny Goffe Morris died in 1874 and Malvern Link, Worcestershire, and was buried in that town's St Mathias Church.

Two years after his wife's death, Mr. Morris wrote and edited The life and poems of Eliza F. Morris (1876). The volume contains, in addition to biographical notes and correspondence, a selection of Mrs. Morris's poems and hymns, never before published.

== Selected works ==
=== Poetry collections ===
- The Voice and the Reply, 1858 (text)
- Life lyrics, 1866

=== Editor ===
- Bible Class Hymn Book

=== Contributor ===
- School Harmonies
