= North Malvern =

Area of Malvern, Worcestershire, England

Coordinates: 52.12083°N 2.33734°W

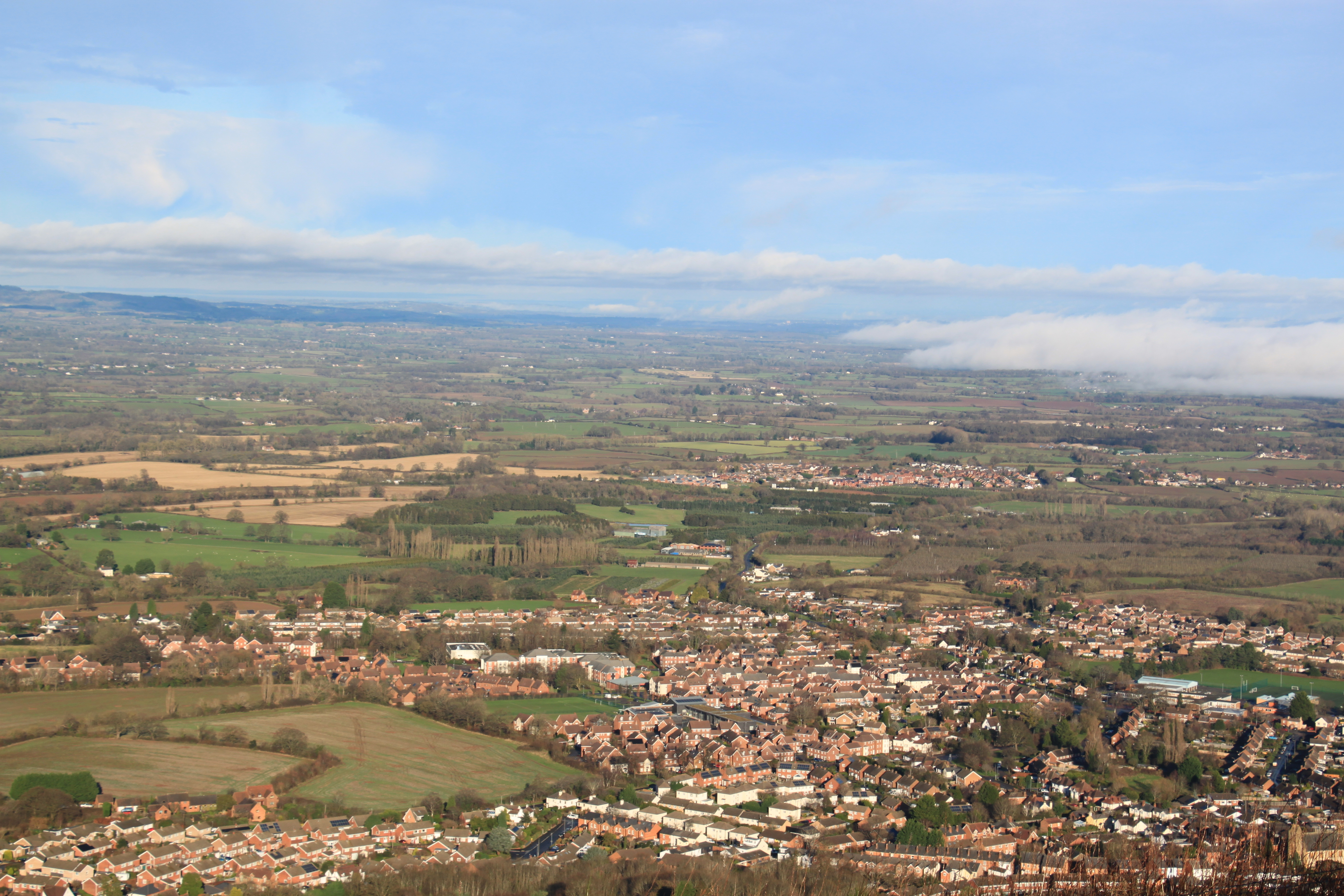
- North Malvern.
- OS grid reference: SO7747
- Civil parish: Malvern
- District: Malvern Hills
- Shire county: Worcestershire
- Region: West Midlands
- Country: England
- Sovereign state: United Kingdom
- Post town: MALVERN
- Postcode district: WR14
- Police: West Mercia
- Fire: Hereford and Worcester
- Ambulance: West Midlands
- UK Parliament: West Worcestershire

North Malvern is a suburb of Malvern, Worcestershire, England. It nestles on the northern slopes of the Malvern Hills. It is a contiguous urban extension of Link Top, and other neighbouring centres of population are Great Malvern, Malvern Link, West Malvern and the former village of Cowleigh. It is part of the civil parish of Malvern, administered by the Malvern Hills District, and is included in the informal region known as The Malverns.

== Architecture ==
Historic buildings include the Clock Tower near Tank Quarry, with its modern work of art the Cascade Gates (2007) in welded steel, by artist and sculptor Rose Garrard, the 18th century North Malvern House (formerly a public house now flats) and the Victorian building of the former North Malvern school.

Religious buildings in the North Malvern area include: Holy Trinity Church (CofE), St. Peters church (CoE) and St. Joseph's (RC). Above North Malvern lie the now defunct quarries of Tank Quarry, North Quarry, and Scar Quarry that were a major feature of local industry until about 1960. The dynamite detonations and the accompanying rock fall that could be heard for miles around were a familiar sound backdrop in the area.

== Education ==
Northleigh primary school is a Church of England (CofE) voluntary aided school.

== Notable people ==
Haile Selassie, Emperor of Ethiopia, lived in Malvern for a while after being forced out of Ethiopia by the Italian invasion in the late 1930s. During this time he attended services at Holy Trinity Church in Link Top and his granddaughters and daughters of court officials were educated at Clarendon School for Girls in North Malvern.

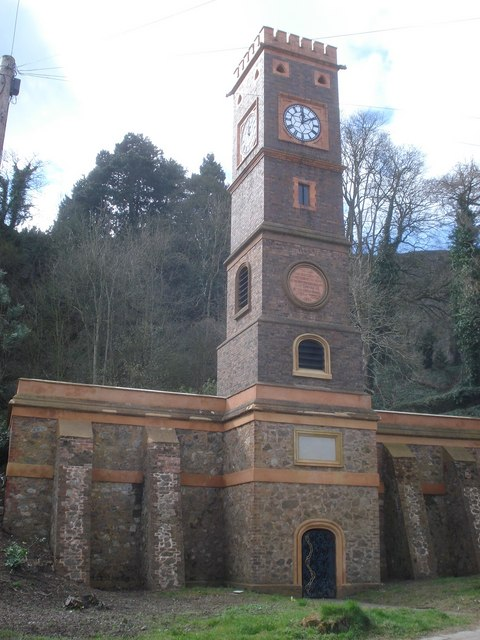
The Clock Tower, North Malvern.

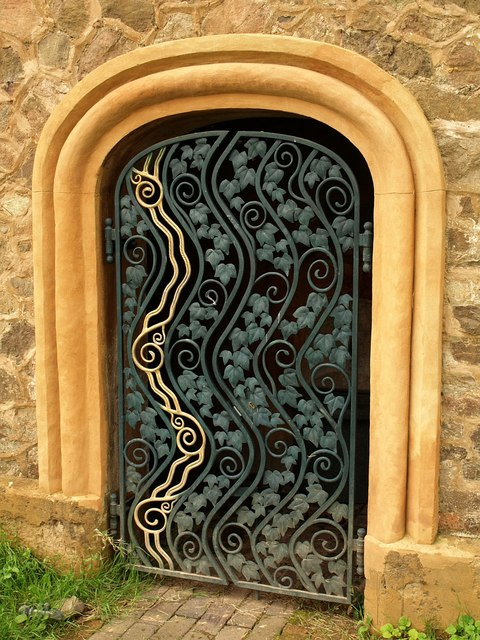
The Cascade Gates (2007) by Rose Garrard, at the Clock Tower, North Malvern.

== North Malvern in cultural life ==
The Tank Quarry on North Hill was used as a location in the Doctor Who serial The Krotons, which was broadcast in four weekly parts from 28 December 1968 to 18 January 1969.

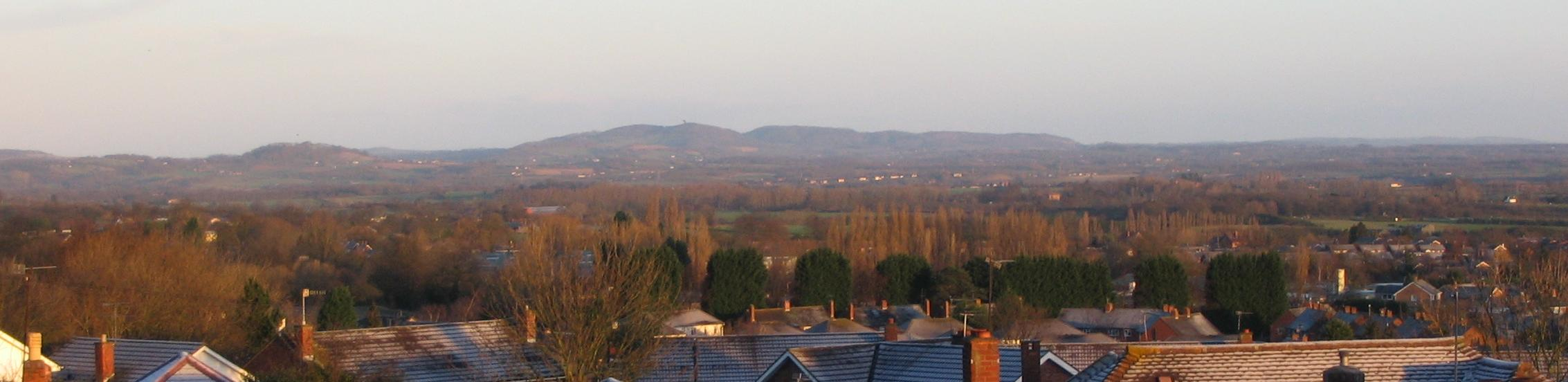
View from North Malvern, looking to the North

== Transport ==
=== Rail ===
North Malvern is served by two stations about one mile apart on the same line. The Great Malvern railway station is located in Avenue Road, Malvern and Malvern Link railway station on the Worcester Road. Direct services are provided to Worcester, Hereford, Birmingham, Oxford and London.

=== Bus ===
Local bus services connect North malvern with the surrounding area including the 42, S42 circular local routes. Serving areas further afield are: the Malvern to Worcester route 44, 44A, 44B operated by First Diamond serving stops at the Barnards Green bus shelter and Pound Bank; The Worcester - Upton-upon-Severn - Malvern route 362/363 operated by Diamond serves that stops at the Barnards Green bus shelter and the Malvern - Gloucester - Cheltenham route 377 (Saturdays only) operated by Diamond, stopping at the Court Road shops and the Barnards Green bus shelter.

=== Air ===
The nearest major airport is Birmingham approximately one hour by road via the M5 and M42 motorways. Gloucestershire Airport located at Staverton, in the Borough of Tewkesbury near Malvern is a busy General Aviation airport used mainly for private charter and scheduled flights to destinations such as the islands of Jersey, Guernsey, and the Isle of Man, pilot training, and by the aircraft of emergency services.
