= Link Top =

Area of Malvern, Worcestershire, England

Coordinates: 52.1206°N 2.3301°W

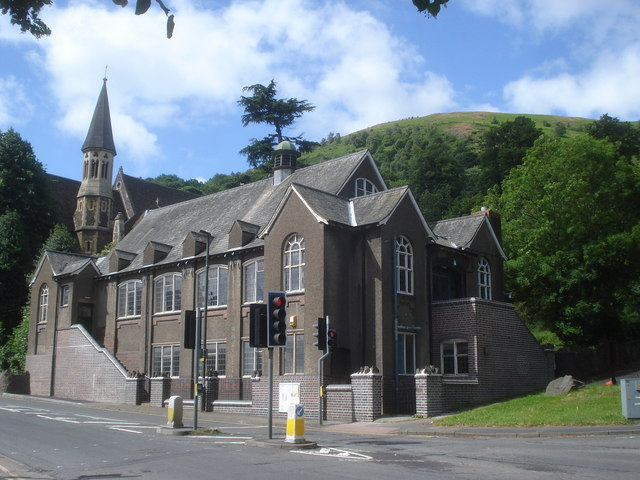
- Holy Trinity Church Hall

- Location within Worcestershire
- Civil parish: Malvern
- District: Malvern Hills
- Shire county: Worcestershire
- Region: West Midlands
- Country: England
- Sovereign state: United Kingdom
- Post town: MALVERN
- Postcode district: WR14
- Dialling code: 01684
- Police: West Mercia
- Fire: Hereford and Worcester
- Ambulance: West Midlands
- UK Parliament: West Worcestershire

Link Top is a locality of Malvern Link, a major population area of the town of Malvern, Worcestershire, England. It is situated at the western extremity of Malvern Link at its boundary with Great Malvern and North Malvern. It is centred on a sharp left hand bend in the Worcester Road (A449) that forms a complex junction with the North Malvern Road, Hornyold Road, Newtown Road, and Lygon Bank.

The main shopping area of Link Top stretches along the Worcester Road and Newtown Road and contains most of the retail outlets and amenities common to a village including pharmacies, dry goods stores, electrical and TV shops, hairdressers, hardware stores, fast-food, a post office, and a number of pubs. The centre of the area is dominated by the Church of the Holy Trinity, the Anglican parish church of North Malvern, built in 1851, and its large parish hall.

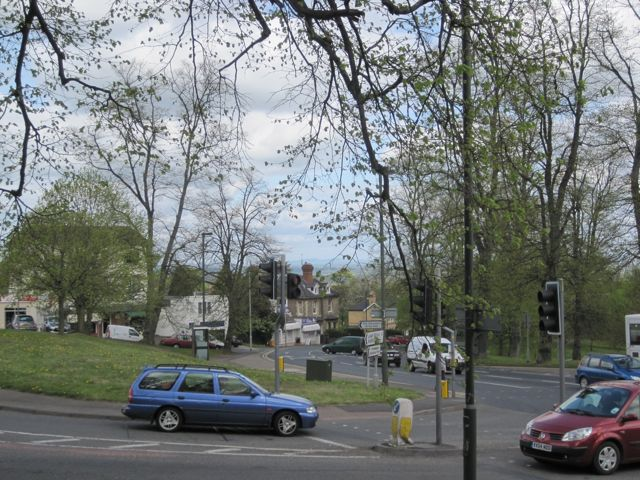
The main road junction at Link Top

== Notable people ==
Haile Selassie, Emperor of Ethiopia, lived in Malvern for a while after being forced out of Ethiopia by the Italian invasion in the late 1930s. During this time he attended services at Holy Trinity Church.

== Transport ==
=== Rail ===
Malvern Link railway station is located in Worcester Road near the centre of Malvern Link and provides direct services to Worcester, Hereford, Gloucester, Birmingham, Oxford and London Paddington.

=== Bus ===
Several local bus services connect Link Top with the surrounding area including the 42, S42 operated by Astons Coaches stopping in Barnards Green bus shelter. Serving areas further afield are: the Malvern to Worcester route 44, 44A, 44B operated by First Midland Red serving stops at the Barnards Green bus shelter and Pound Bank; The Worcester - Upton-upon-Severn - Malvern route 362/363 operated by Diamond West Midlands serves that stops at the Barnards Green bus shelter and the Malvern - Gloucester - Cheltenham route 377 (Saturdays only) operated by Diamond West Midlands, stopping at the Court Road shops and the Barnards Green bus shelter.

=== Air ===
The nearest major airport is Birmingham Airport approximately one hour by road via the M5 and M42 motorways. Gloucestershire Airport located at Staverton, in the Borough of Tewkesbury near Malvern is a busy General Aviation airport used mainly for private charter and scheduled flights to destinations such as the islands of Jersey, Guernsey, and the Isle of Man, pilot training, and by the aircraft of emergency services.
