= Church of St Peter, Cowleigh =

St Peter's Church
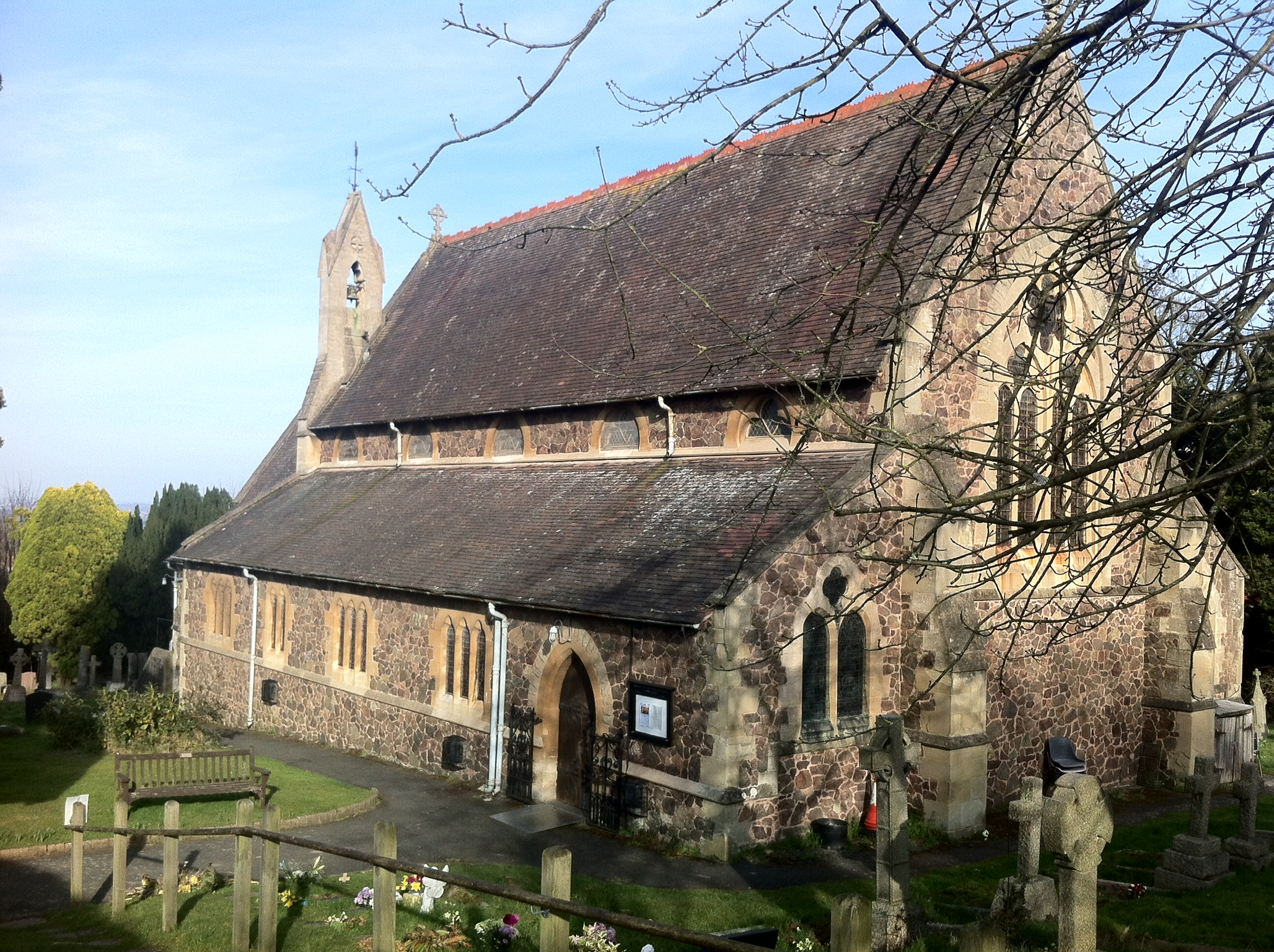
- St Peter's Church, Cowleigh
- St Peter's Church
- 52.125879°N 2.338140°W
- Location: Cowleigh, Malvern, Worcestershire
- Country: England
- Denomination: Anglicanism
- Churchmanship: Anglo-Catholicism
- Website: mlwc.church

History
- Founded: 29 June 1863 (St. Peter's Day)
- Consecrated: 29 June 1866 (St. Peter's Day)

Architecture
- Functional status: Active
- Heritage designation: Grade II Listed
- Designated: 1 January 1970
- Architect: George Edmund Street
- Style: Early English and Geometrical
- Years built: 1865

Administration
- Diocese: Worcester
- Archdeaconry: Worcester
- Deanery: Malvern
- Parish: Malvern Link with Cowleigh

The Church of St Peter, Cowleigh, is a Grade II listed Anglican church in the parish of Malvern Link and Cowleigh. It was built in 1865, and was designed by George Edmund Street.

== Gallery ==
Church of St Peter, Cowleigh
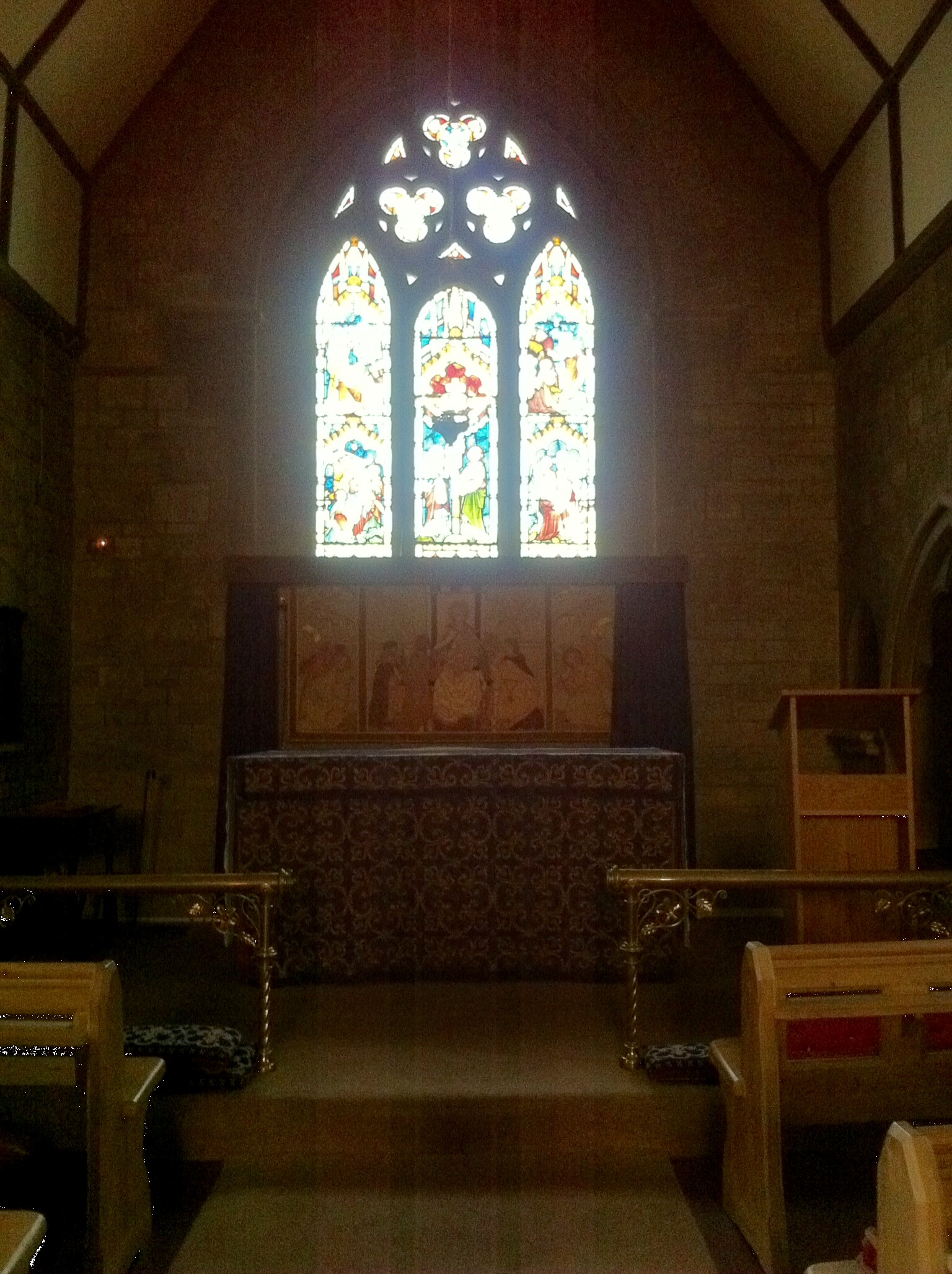
The Altar

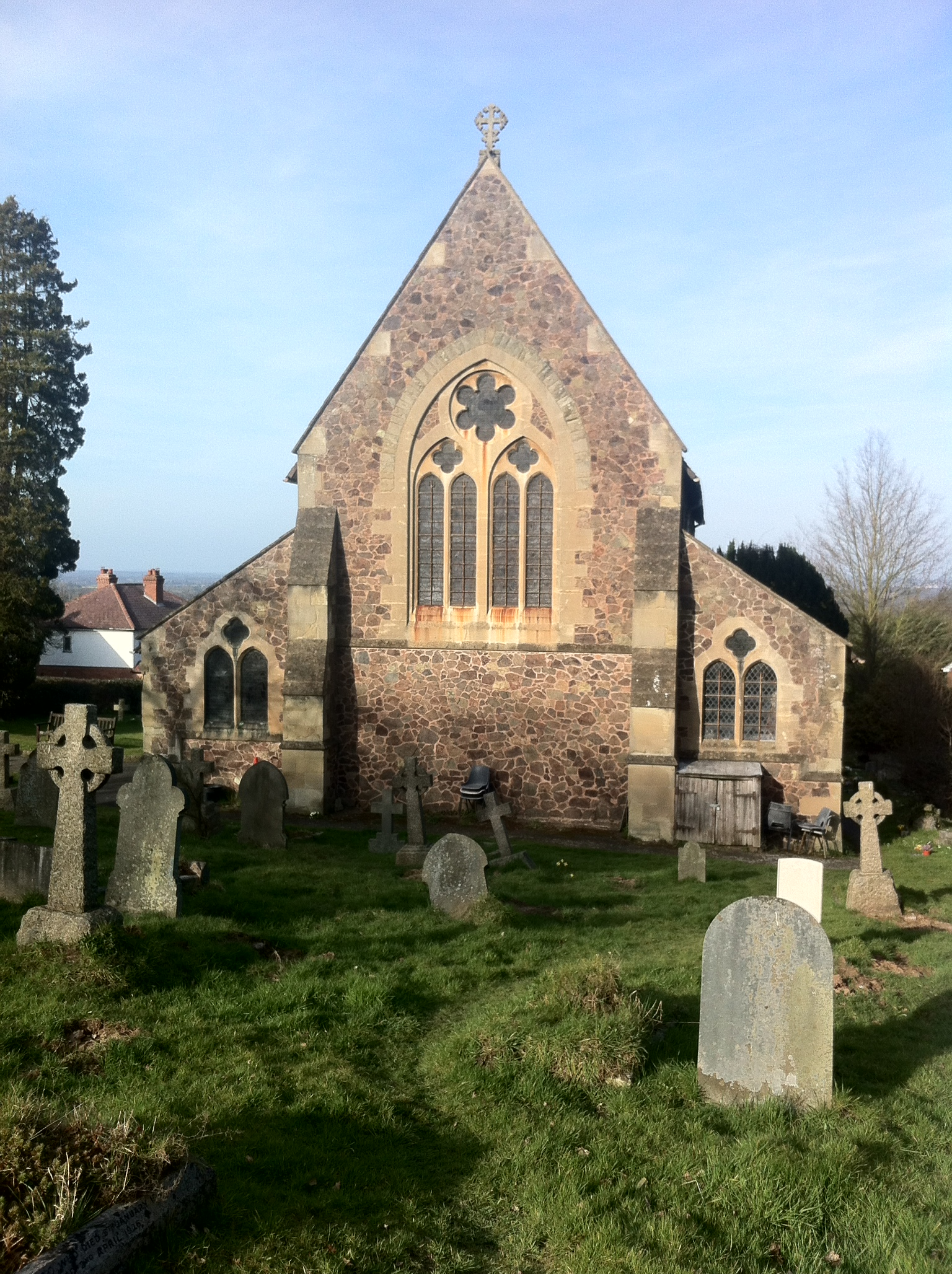
Exterior, East

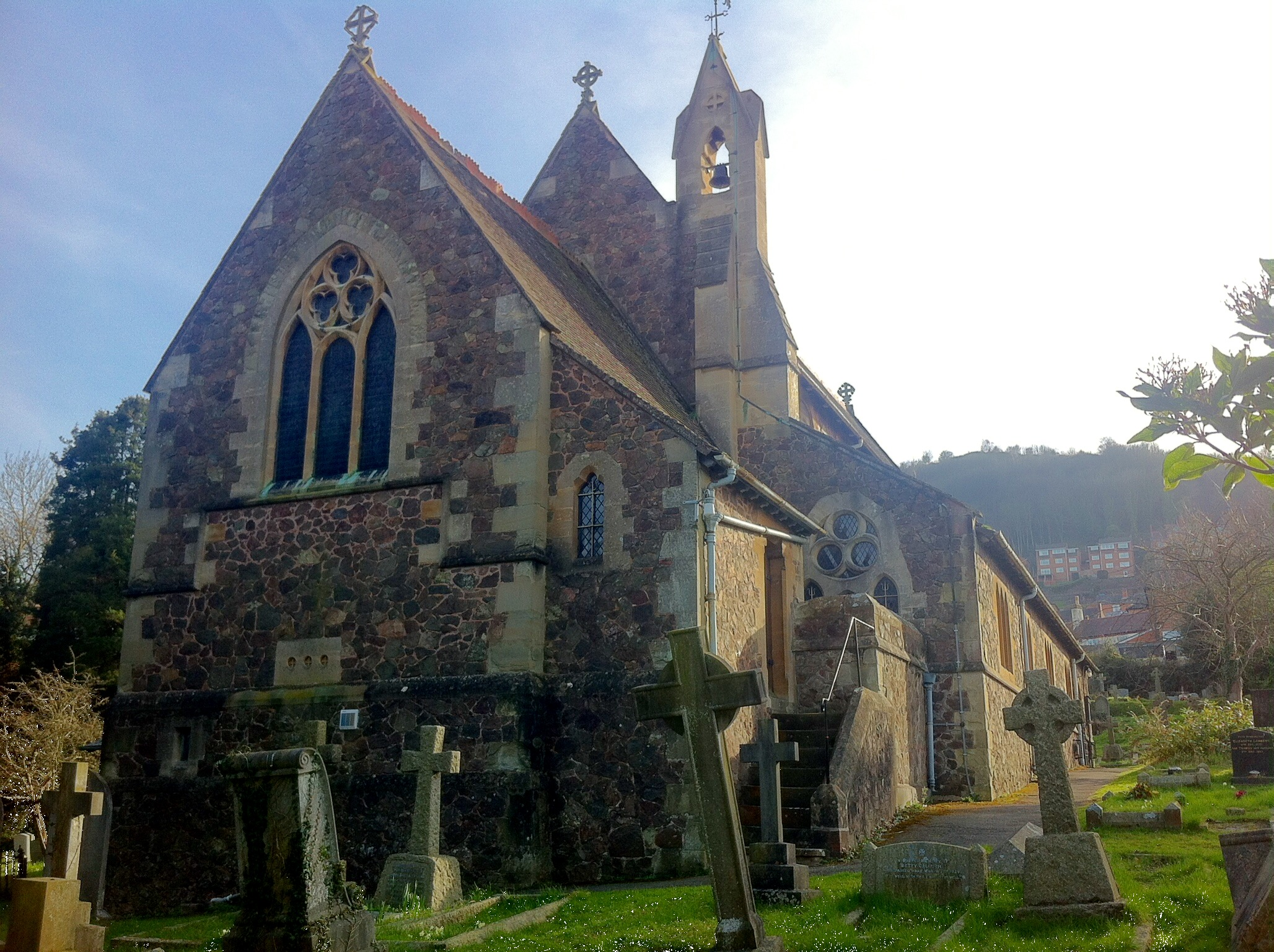
Exterior South West

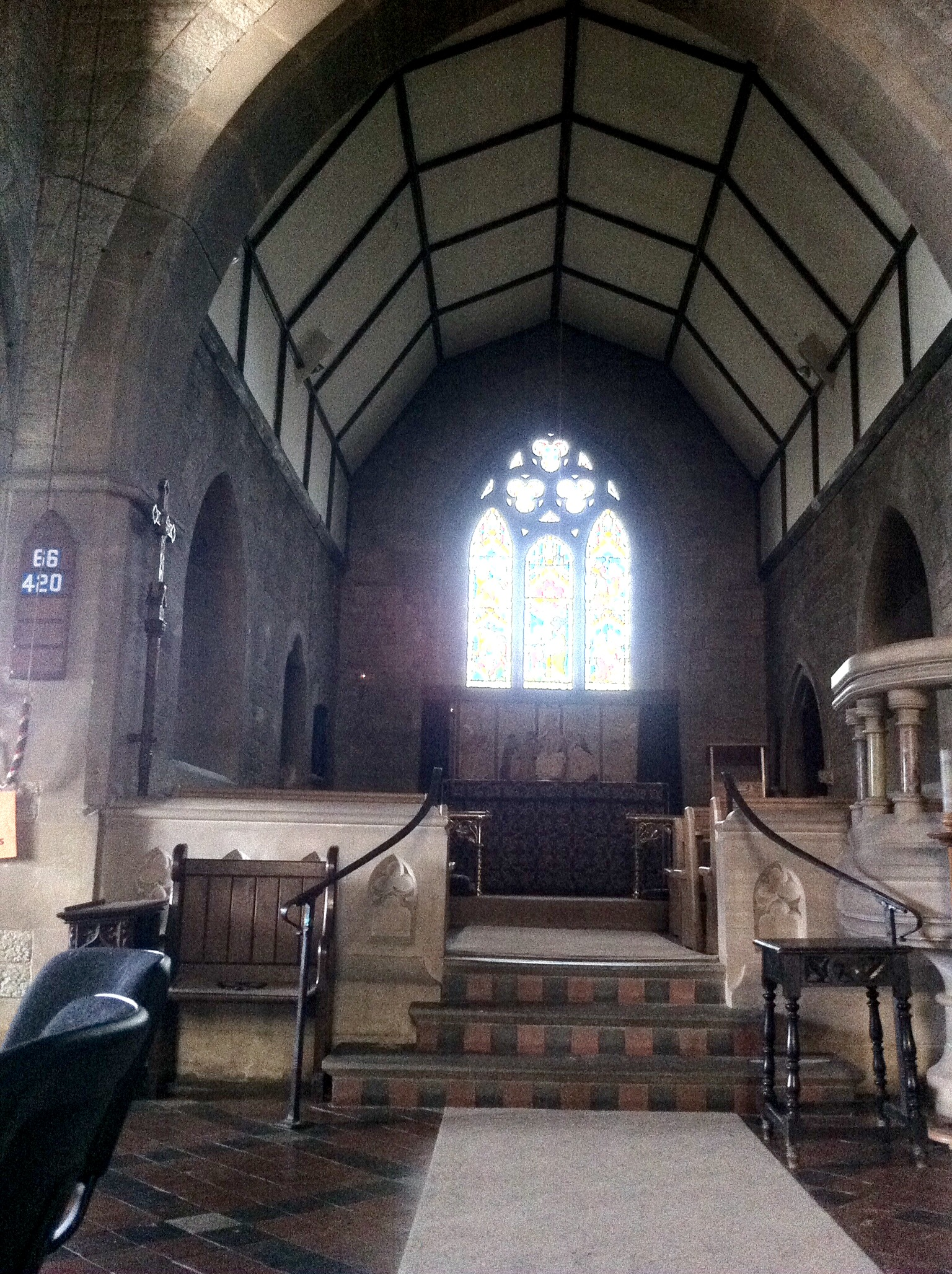
Interior East

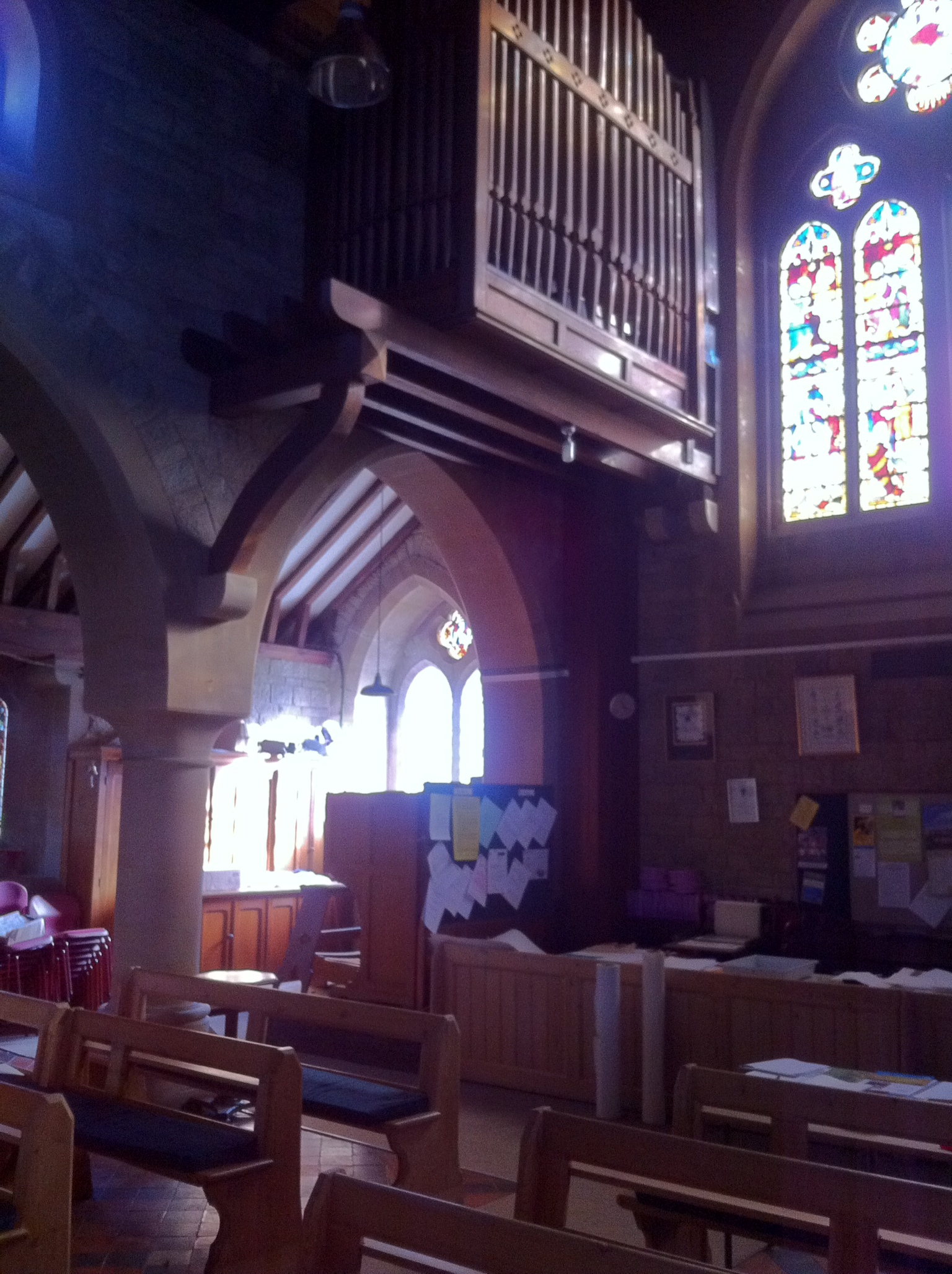
Organ

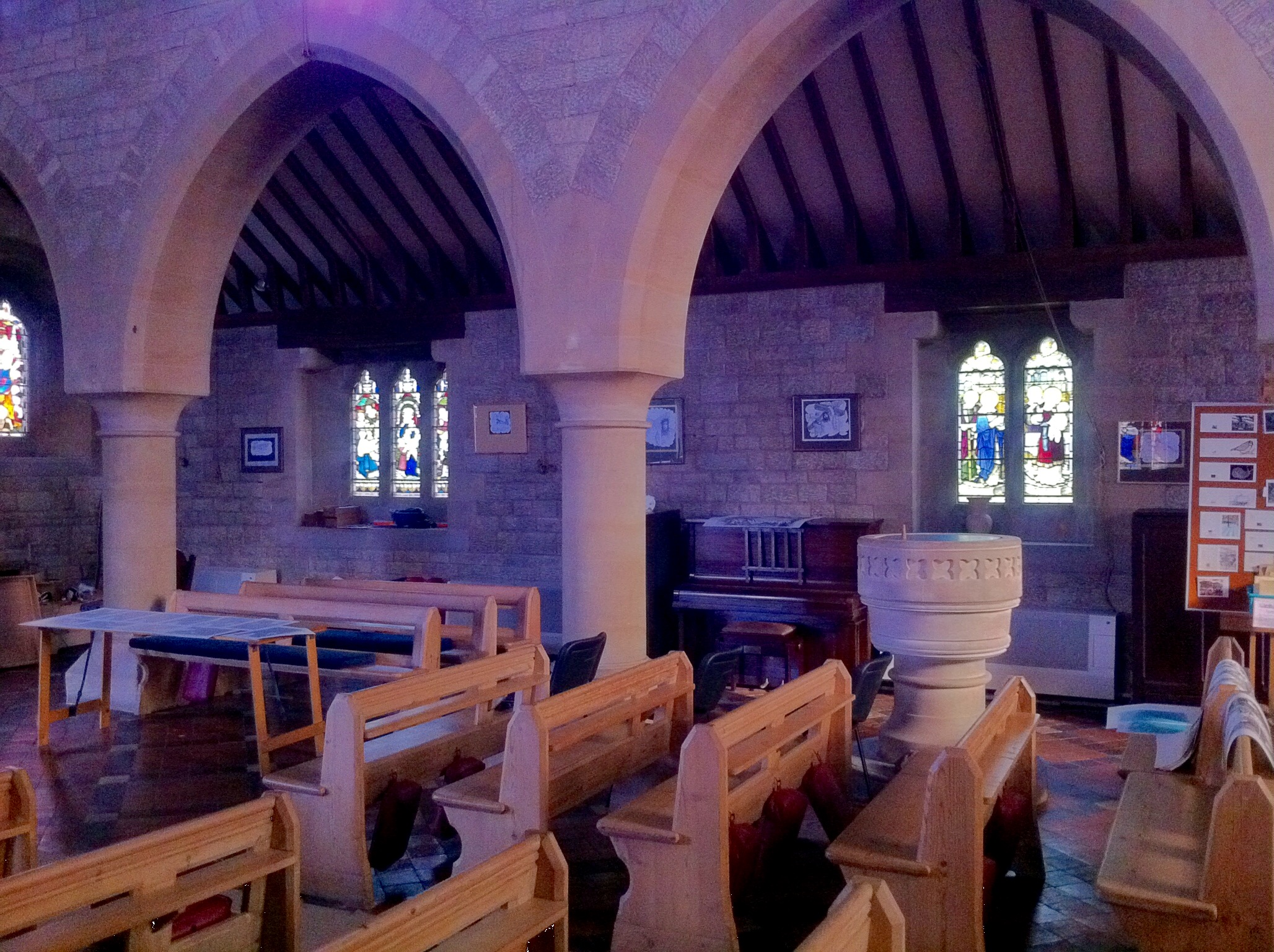
Interior South

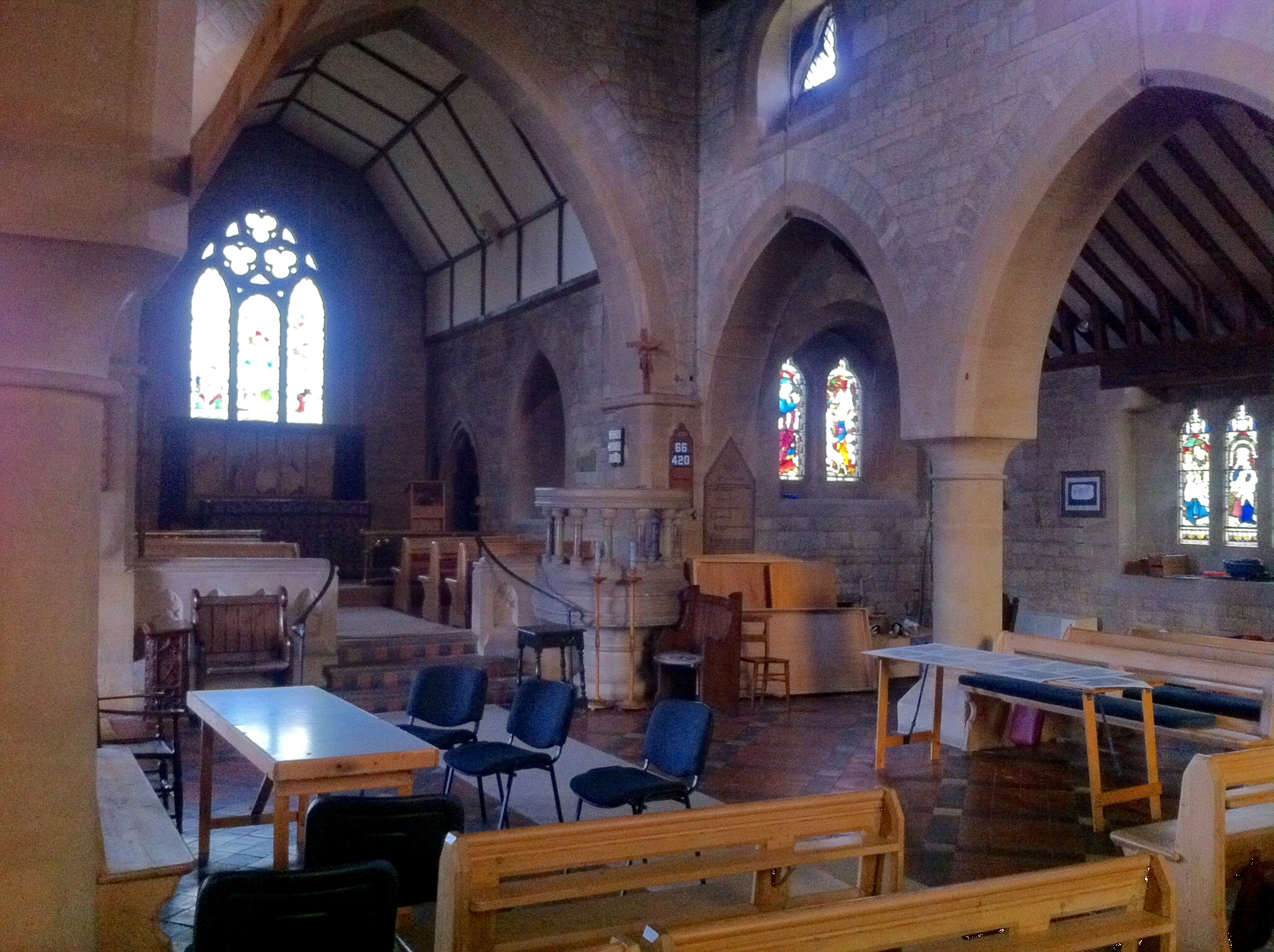
Interior South East

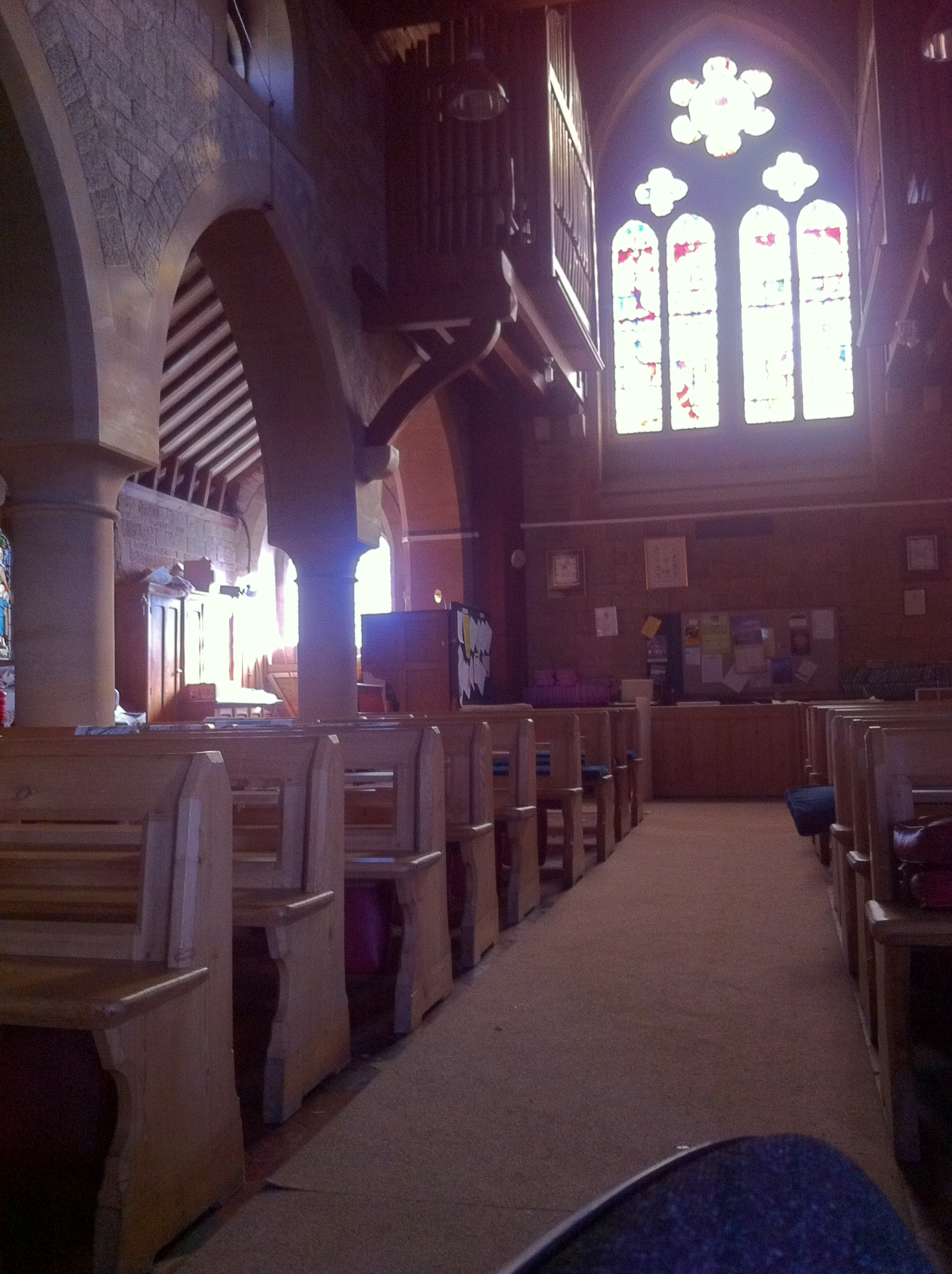
Interior West

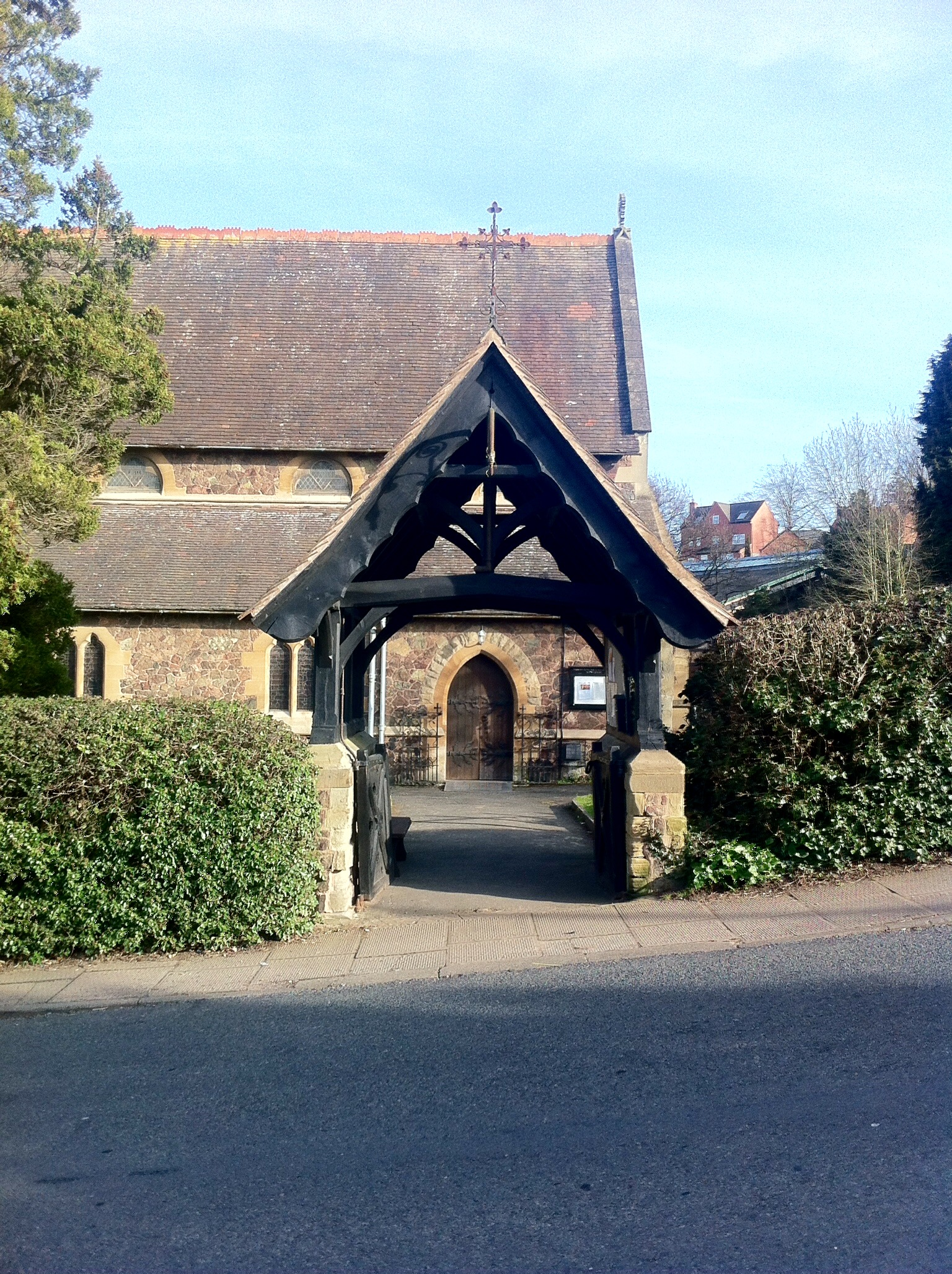
Lych Gate
