= Holy Trinity Church, Malvern Link =

Holy Trinity Church
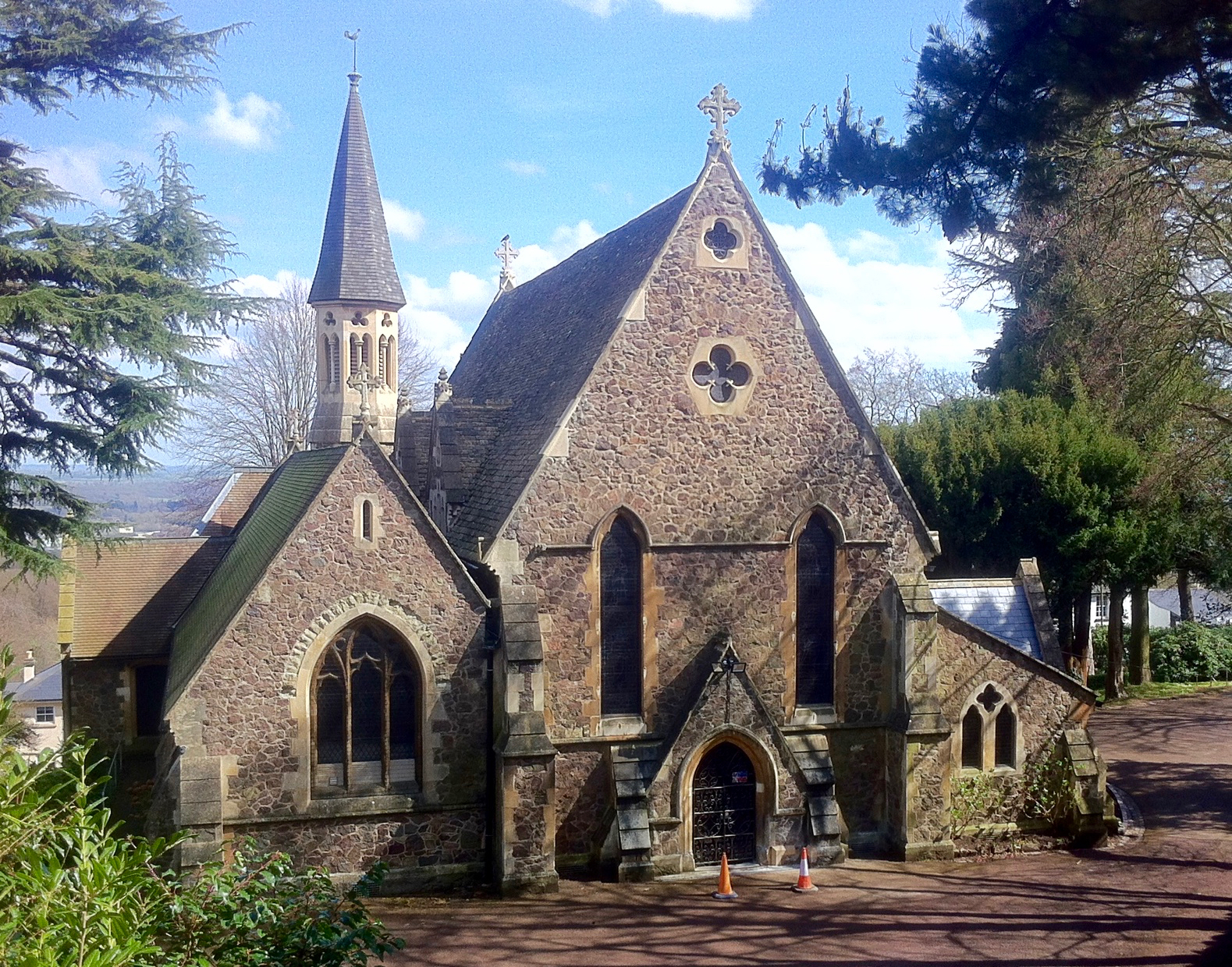
- Holy Trinity Church, North Malvern
- Holy Trinity Church
- 52.119945°N 2.330215°W
- Location: North Malvern, Worcestershire
- Country: England
- Denomination: Anglican
- Website: http://www.holytrinitymalvern.org.uk

History
- Consecrated: 9 September 1851

Architecture
- Functional status: Active
- Heritage designation: Grade II Listed
- Designated: 3 April 2008
- Architect: Samuel Daukes
- Years built: 1850-51, 1872, 1896-7, 1908-9

Administration
- Diocese: Worcester
- Archdeaconry: Worcester
- Deanery: Malvern
- Parish: The Holy Trinity, Great Malvern

Clergy
- Vicar(s): As of 2015, The Revd William (David) Nichol

The Church of the Holy Trinity in North Malvern, Worcestershire, England is an Anglican church built in 1850–51 with money raised by subscription. Designed by the Victorian architect Samuel Daukes, with a number of additions made between 1872 and 1909, the church was given a Grade II heritage listing in 2008. Holy Trinity Church remains a functioning place of worship.

== History ==
As the population of Malvern increased during the 19th century, a need was felt for residents of North Malvern to be able to worship closer to their homes. A fund was created in 1841 which sought subscriptions for the building of a new church.

Charles Morris donated £2000, Lady Emily Foley £1000, and £800 was raised from public subscribers. The Diocesan Church Building Society granted £300, with a further £225 coming from the Incorporated Church Building Society. Of these funds, £3,500 provided for the building.

The architect, Samuel Daukes (or Dawkes), was a member of the Ecclesiological Society, and many of the influences of the Oxford Movement can be detected in the layout of the interior. The altar is raised in the chancel, and the chancel itself is richly decorated, and is a step or two above the nave.

The church was enlarged in 1872 by George and Henry Haddon (who also designed the boarding houses at Malvern College) by the addition of a north aisle. This was dedicated on 17 July 1873. The vestry and dormer windows were added to the nave in 1897.

In 2008, the building was given a Grade II heritage listing. It remains a functioning place of worship within the Church of England.

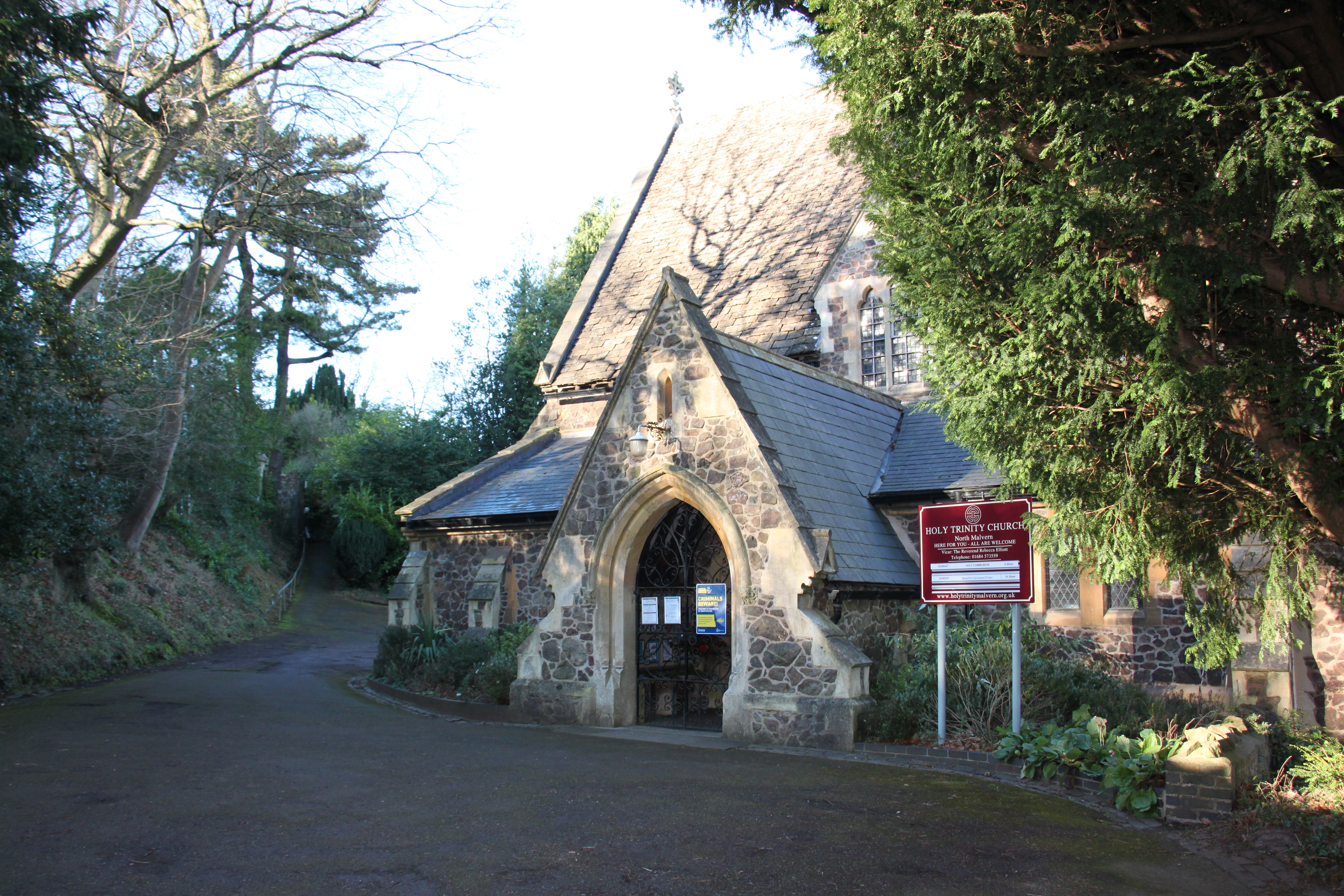
