= Church of St Matthias, Malvern Link =

Church of Saint Matthias
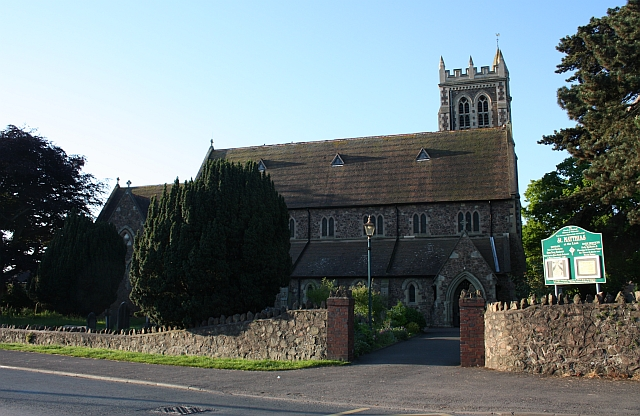
- Church of Saint Matthias
- 52.129366°N 2.317715°W
- OS grid reference: SO 78370 47904
- Location: Malvern Link, Worcestershire
- Country: England
- Denomination: Anglicanism
- Churchmanship: Anglo-Catholicism
- Website: mlwc.church

History
- Founded: March 1844
- Consecrated: 13 January 1886

Architecture
- Functional status: Active
- Heritage designation: Grade II Listed
- Designated: 11 May 1979
- Architect: George Gilbert Scott
- Years built: 1844-46, 1858, 1862, 1880-1881, 1899

Administration
- Diocese: Worcester
- Archdeaconry: Worcester
- Deanery: Malvern
- Parish: Malvern Link with Cowleigh

The Church of St Matthias is an Anglican place of worship in Malvern Link, England. Prior to the establishment of this church, the residents of Malvern Link had to walk 3 miles to their parish church, St. Edburga's Church in Leigh. The Rector of Leigh, Henry Somers-Cocks, requested Earl Somers to provide some land for a new church, which he did on 27 December 1843, the form of Link Meadow.

The initial church was designed by Sir George Gilbert Scott. It seated 300 people, and cost £1,900 to build. It was completed in 1846 and consecrated by Bishop Pepys of Worcester on 13 January.

In 1858, the church was extended to the south, and a new tower was added in 1862.

In 1880, the church was found to be too small, and the decision was made to extend it eastwards. Tenders were invited, and Thomas Collins of Tewkesbury, who estimated the costs to be £2,400. The costs of this extension were principally met by Earl Beauchamp. The architect for the new church was Frederick William Hunt of London.

The present tower was added in 1889. The tower holds a ring of ten bells cast by John Taylor & Co, the world's largest working bell foundry. Bell #10 was cast in 1899, #1 and 2 in 1993, and #3 to 9 in 1900. The Tenor, the heaviest, weighs 16 cwt and is tuned to F#. The first full peal at St Matthias was of Grandsire Triples, and was rung on 1 June 1901.

The chapel screens are the work of Robert Thompson, the 'mouseman' of Kilburn in Yorkshire.

== See also ==
- Places of worship in Malvern, Worcestershire
- Stedman triples rung at St Mathias
