= Malvern Link =

Area of Malvern, Worcestershire, England

Coordinates: 52.12553°N 2.3161°W

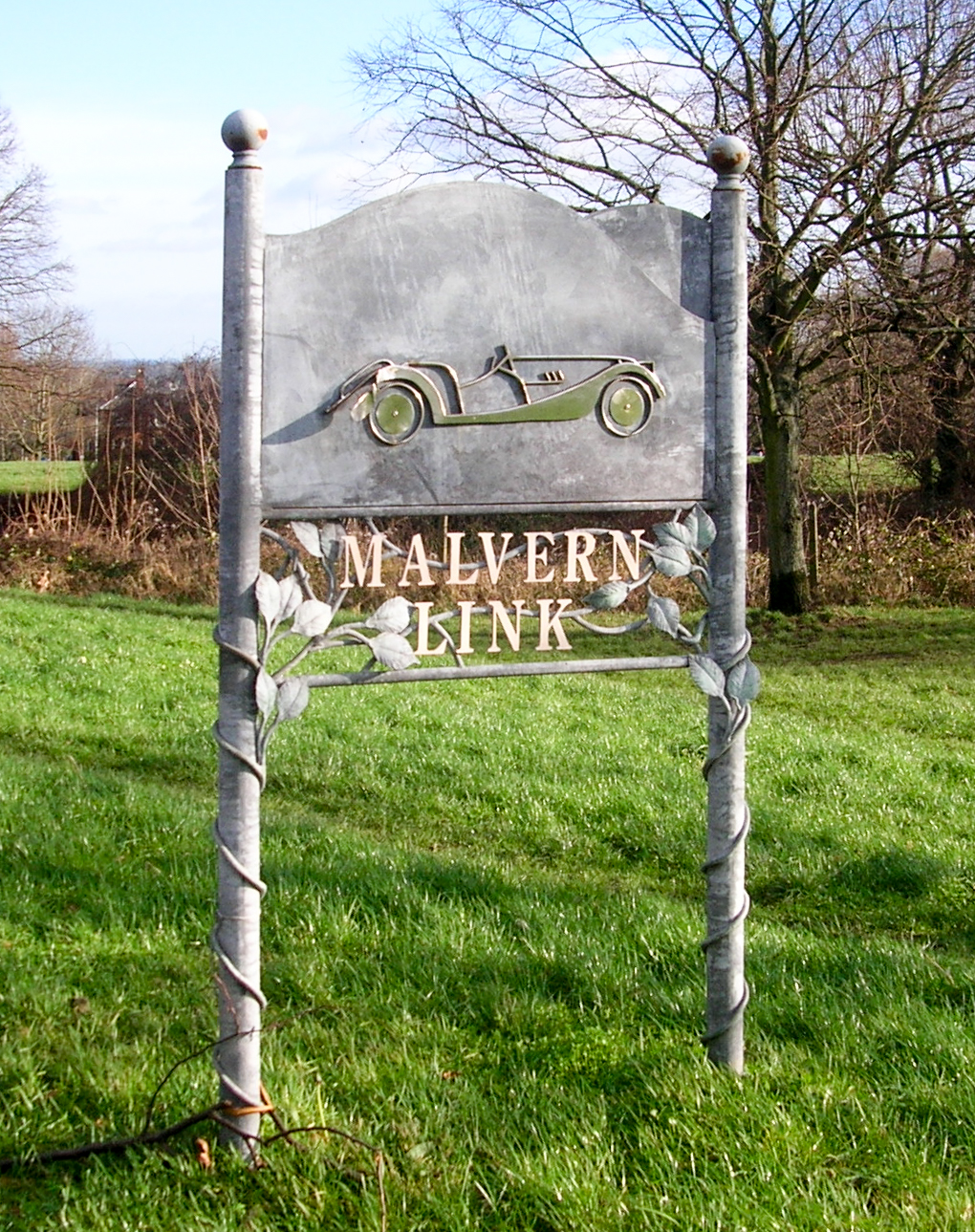
- Sign on the Worcester Road entering the area depicting a Morgan car

- Location within Worcestershire
- Population: 6,155
- Civil parish: Malvern
- District: Malvern Hills
- Shire county: Worcestershire
- Region: West Midlands
- Country: England
- Sovereign state: United Kingdom
- Post town: MALVERN
- Postcode district: WR14
- Dialling code: 01684
- Police: West Mercia
- Fire: Hereford and Worcester
- Ambulance: West Midlands
- UK Parliament: West Worcestershire

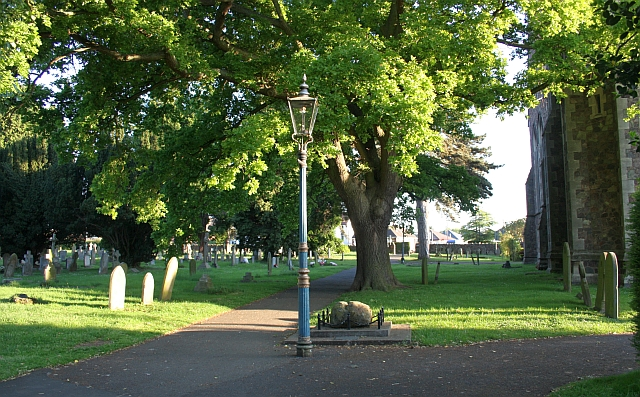
St Matthias Churchyard and the Link Stone

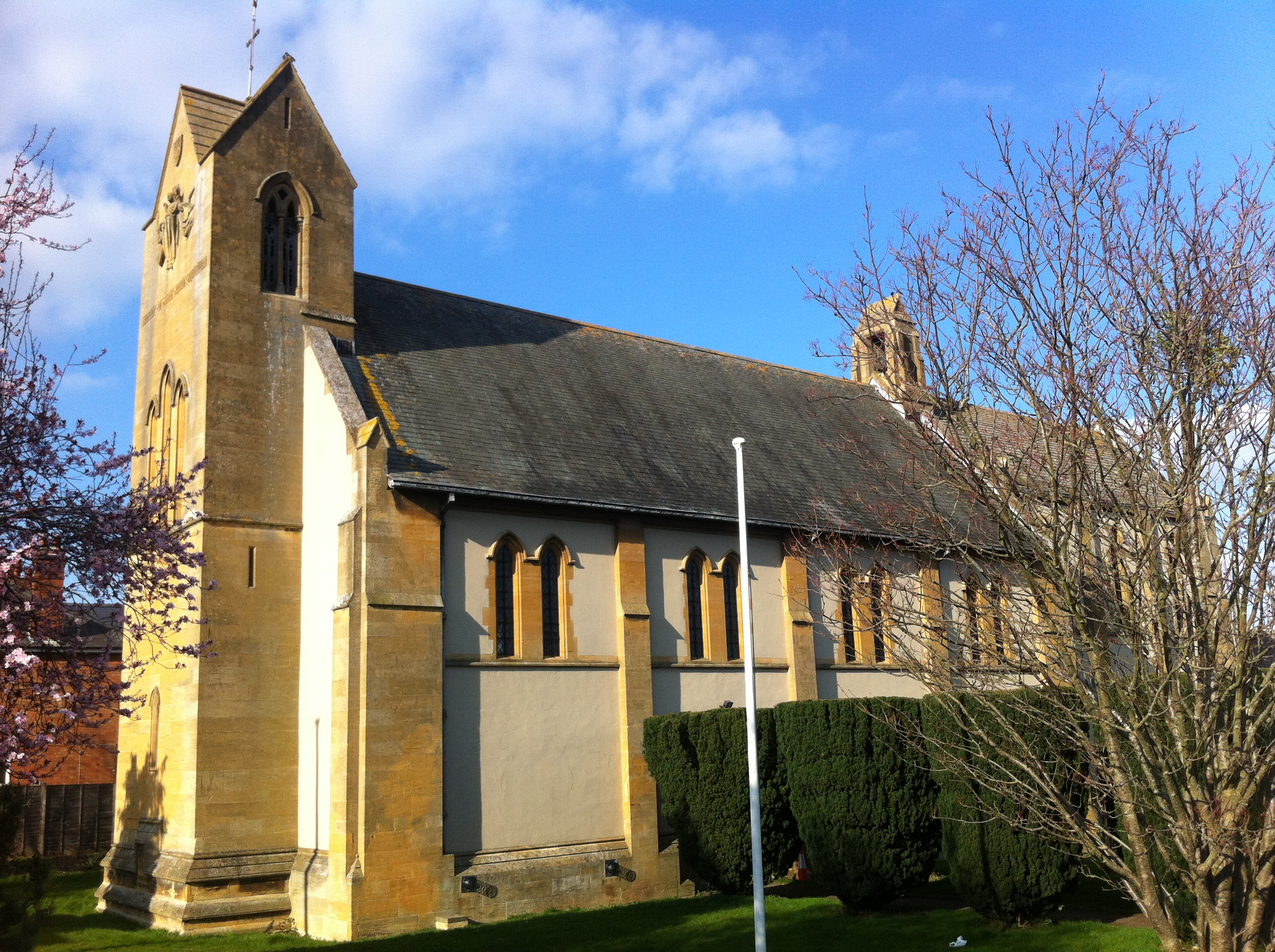
The Church of the Ascension

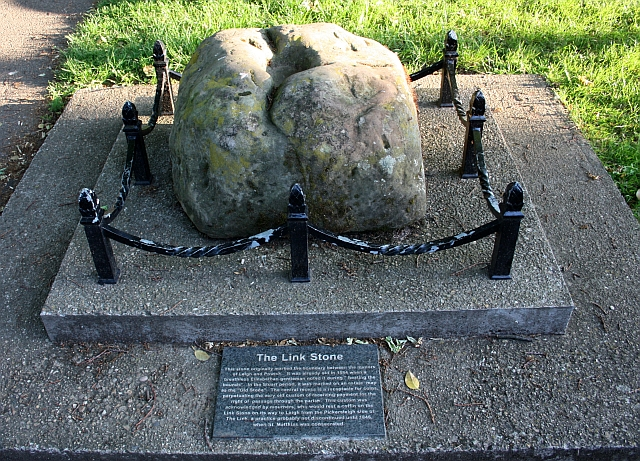
The Link Stone

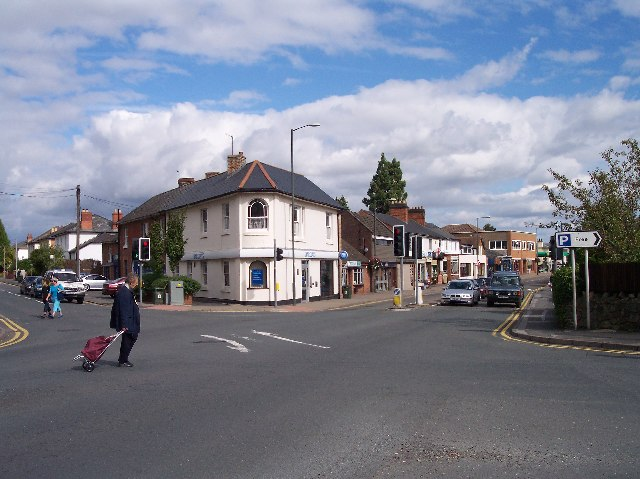
Malvern Link crossroads

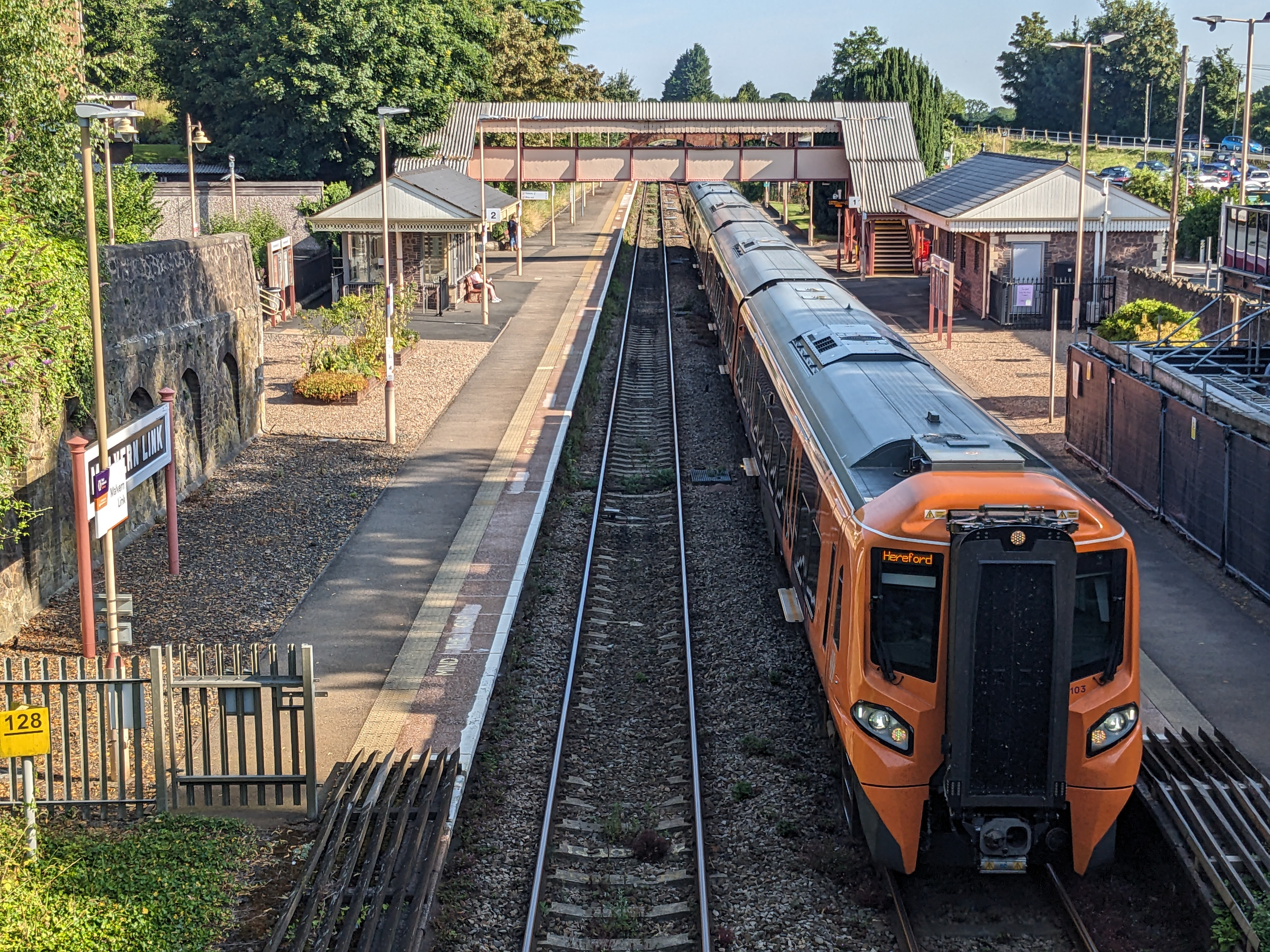
Malvern Link railway station

Malvern Link is an area in the civil parish of Malvern, in the Malvern Hills District, in Worcestershire, England to the north and east of Great Malvern. The centres of Malvern Link and Great Malvern are separated by Link Common, an area of open land that is statutorily protected by the Malvern Hills Conservators. The population of Link ward in 2022 was 6,301.

== Etymology ==
The place-name Link is first attested in 1215, in forms such as Link and Linche, and the partly French forms La Lynke and La Lynche. The name derives from the Old English word hlinc ("a ridge of land, bank") and must previously have denoted the outlying ridge of the Malvern Hills on which it is situated.

A popular folk tale about the origin of the name is that it arose because the Victorians used to link up more horses to the carriages so that they could be pulled up the hill on the A449, which runs through the centre of Malvern Link to the small urban centre of Link Top at its western end before arriving in the town centre of Great Malvern. At the point where the A449 road passes through Malvern Link it is called Worcester Road, as it leads directly into the centre of the city of Worcester about six miles to the north east.

== Location ==
The main urban area is to the north of the Worcester Road and the Link Common that marks a sharply defined boundary on the south of the settlement between the railway station and the area's western limit at Newtown Road in Link Top. The urban development takes a gentle transition through the neighbourhoods of Upper Howsell and Lower Howsell to the farms and communities of Leigh Sinton in the north and Newland and Madresfield in the west. To the south along the main axis of Pickersleigh Road, an unbroken built up area merges seamlessly into Barnards Green, a suburb of the former independent town of Great Malvern.

== History ==
=== Ancient and medieval ===
Malvern Link was the key site of the Romano-British pottery industry that produced Severn Valley Ware. There are several kilns in the Malvern Link-Newland area and numerous water-filled clay pits, now lined with trees.

According to Brian S. Smith, "The many local placenames ... which first appear in thirteenth century records were probably current a full century earlier. ... By 1276 ... there was, therefore, a probable population of at least 200 scattered in the old hamlets of Baldenhall, Guarlford, Poolbrook and the Link ..."

=== The Link Stone ===
A perambulation of the boundaries of the Malvern Chase in 1584 describes "a great Stone in a Tufte of bushes" at Link Top which was recorded on a Stuart map as the "Whore Stone" (meaning hoar or ancient stone). In 1744 the Link Stone was located at the beginning of Pickersleigh road. It has since been relocated to the St Matthias churchyard.

An inscription on a plaque near the stone reads:

This stone originally marked the boundary between the Manors of Leigh and Powick. It was already old in 1584 when a breathless Elizabethan gentleman noted it during "beating the bounds". In the Stuart period it was marked on an estate map as the "Old Stone". The central recess is a receptacle for coins perpetuating the very old custom of receiving payment for the right of passage through the parish. This custom was acknowledged by mourners, who would rest a coffin on the Link Stone on its way to Leigh from the Pickersleigh side of the Link, a practice probably not discontinued until 1846 when St Matthias was consecrated.

=== Twentieth-century development ===
Malvern Link is the location of the majority of Malvern's council and private housing estates, and retail parks and factory centres that have emerged since the 1950s. The expansion in the second half of the 19th century began essentially as ribbon development along the Worcester Road, the eastern approach to Malvern, at the same time as Malvern's rise to popularity as a Spa Town. When the railway arrived in the mid 19th century, the settlement had reached sufficient dimensions to justify its own fully featured station although the Great Malvern station is only about one mile further down the line. Large villas and small hotels were constructed along the entire length of the northern side of the Worcester Road, from the railway station to Link Top affording them an unhindered view over the Malvern Common and many of them were converted to boarding schools following the decline of the spa industry, and major middle class residential areas developed northwards during the inter-war years of the 1920s and 1930s.

== Population ==
As with the rest of Malvern, the Link owes much of its development to the area's rapid expansion from a cluster of hamlets and manors to a busy spa town during the mid 19th century. In 1942 the population swelled again when the Telecommunications Research Establishment (TRE) relocated to Malvern to occupy a site at Barnards Green, and a further site of the RAF Radio Training School on the location of the former Pale Manor Farm in Leigh Sinton Road in Malvern Link, that came to be known as RRE North Site.

A new community hospital for Malvern on the site of Seaford Court, a former private prep school in Malvern Link, close to the station, was opened in 2011. As of 2011, further development was planned for the second decade of the 21st century, with approximately 700 new houses, 10 hectares of employment land, a primary school and community centre destined for former farm land between Malvern Link and Newland. This would effectively merge the two villages into a conurbation with Malvern Link, creating new neighbourhoods that had yet to be named.

== Governance ==
Malvern Link constitutes the major part of the Link ward of the civil parish governed by Malvern Town Council (returning 4 councillors to the Town Council) and the same ward is also used to return 3 councillors to Malvern Hills District Council. The ward includes all of Malvern Link from Link Top in the west to the Newland roundabout in the east except a small part of the Malvern Link area in the west that is allocated to Dyson Perrins ward. The area of Malvern Link also includes part of the Pickersleigh ward to the south and also includes the former settlements of Upper Howsell and Lower Howsell.

Malvern Link was formerly a chapelry in the parish of Leigh, in 1894 Malvern Link became a separate civil parish and an urban district, in 1898 the urban district was abolished on 1 April 1974 the parish was abolished and became part of Malvern unparished area. In 1951 the parish had a population of 7950.

== Industry and commerce ==
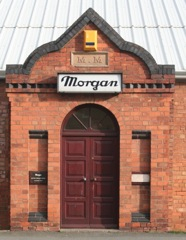
Morgan car factory main entrance

Malvern Link is home to the Morgan Motor Company, a manufacturer of luxury sports roadsters, and Chance Brothers, the remaining factory of what was once the largest manufacturer of glassware in the United Kingdom. Malvern's fire station is on Worcester Road in Malvern Link.

The main shopping area of Malvern Link stretches along the Worcester Road in from the junction of Spring Lane to the junction of Pickersleigh Road at the Malvern Link railway station. It contains all the retail outlets common to a small town including pharmacies, furniture and dry goods stores, supermarkets, hardware stores, gardening centres, banks, betting shops, groceries, butchers, and cafés and fast-food, and a former cinema that is now a furniture warehouse. A mural on the Pickersleigh Road wall of the Victoria pharmacy depicts many of Malvern's landmarks, including the hills, Edward Elgar and Link Stone, which now resides in the churchyard of nearby St Matthias Church. It also contains the opening line (in Latin) of Psalm 121, 'I will lift up mine eyes unto the hills', the so-called 'Malvern Psalm'.

A retail park (the Malvern Hills Retail Park) has been in constant development of Malvern Link since the mid-1990s, with stores that include the branches of national chains such as Boots, Morrisons, Marks & Spencer, Matalan, Next and Halfords. The retail park is an extension of the Spring Lane trading estate, a commercial park of small modern factories, warehouses and service providers, that began its development in the early 1960s.

== Transport ==
=== Rail ===
Malvern Link railway station is located in Worcester Road, and provides direct services to Worcester, Hereford, Gloucester, Birmingham, Oxford, London Paddington and Bristol.

=== Bus ===
Several local bus services connect Malvern Link with the surrounding area including the 42, S42 operated by LMS Travel stopping in Barnards Green bus shelter. Serving areas further afield are: the Malvern to Worcester route 44 operated by First Midland Red serving stops at the Barnards Green bus shelter and Pound Bank; The Worcester - Upton-upon-Severn - Malvern route 362/363 operated by Diamond serves that stops at the Barnards Green bus shelter and the Malvern - Gloucester - Cheltenham route 377 (Saturdays only) operated by Diamond, stopping at the Court Road shops and the Barnards Green bus shelter.

=== Sport ===
The playing fields at Victoria Park provide children's "safe" play areas. The main football pitch was replaced in 2021 by a state of the art Basketball Court. One football pitch remains and both Malvern Rugby Club and Barnards Green Cricket Club are a very short distance away.

=== Air ===
The nearest major airport is Birmingham which is accessible by train via Birmingham New Street and then 10 minutes further on a London Euston train, or trains travelling in the Coventry direction.

Birmingham International Airport is assumed to be approximately one hour by road via the M5 and M42 motorways. Gloucestershire Airport located at Staverton, in the Borough of Tewkesbury near Malvern is a busy General Aviation airport used mainly for private charter and scheduled flights to destinations such as the islands of Jersey, Guernsey and the Isle of Man, pilot training, and by the aircraft of emergency services.

== Education ==
One of Malvern's two secondary schools, Dyson Perrins CE Sports College, is located in Malvern Link. The school was endowed by and is named after Charles William Dyson Perrins, grandson of the co-founder of Lea and Perrins, the manufacturer of the local product Worcestershire sauce that is sold worldwide. The area also has several primary schools (such as Somers Park Primary School and St. Matthias C of E Primary School). The location of the former independent boys boarding school Seaford Court, is the site of a new Malvern community hospital that was opened in 2010.

== Notable residents ==
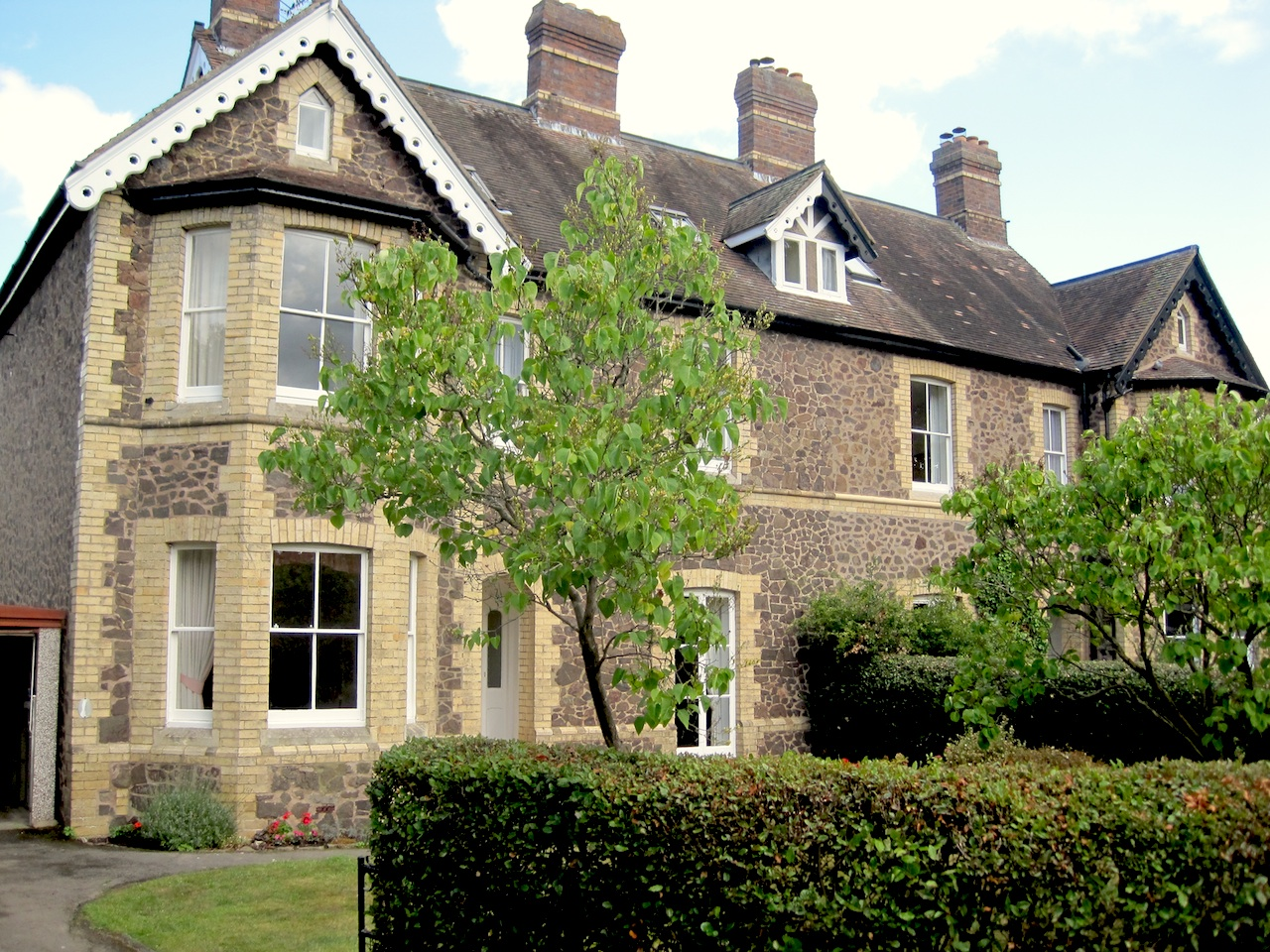
"Forli", a house in Malvern Link where Elgar lived

Edward Elgar, composer, lived here. On returning from London to settle in the Malverns, in 1891 Elgar and his wife leased a semi-detached house at 37 Alexandra Road, Malvern Link, which they named "Forli". They lived in the house until 1898, when the Elgars moved to Storridge. It was during the "Forli" years that Elgar composed many of his works, including The Black Knight (1892), Sursum Corda (1894) and the Variations on an Original Theme (1898) that gained him his international reputation.

The hymnwriter Eliza F. Morris also lived in Malvern Link, where she died in 1874.
