= Bromsgrove =

Town in Worcestershire, England

Coordinates: 52°20′07″N 2°03′33″W

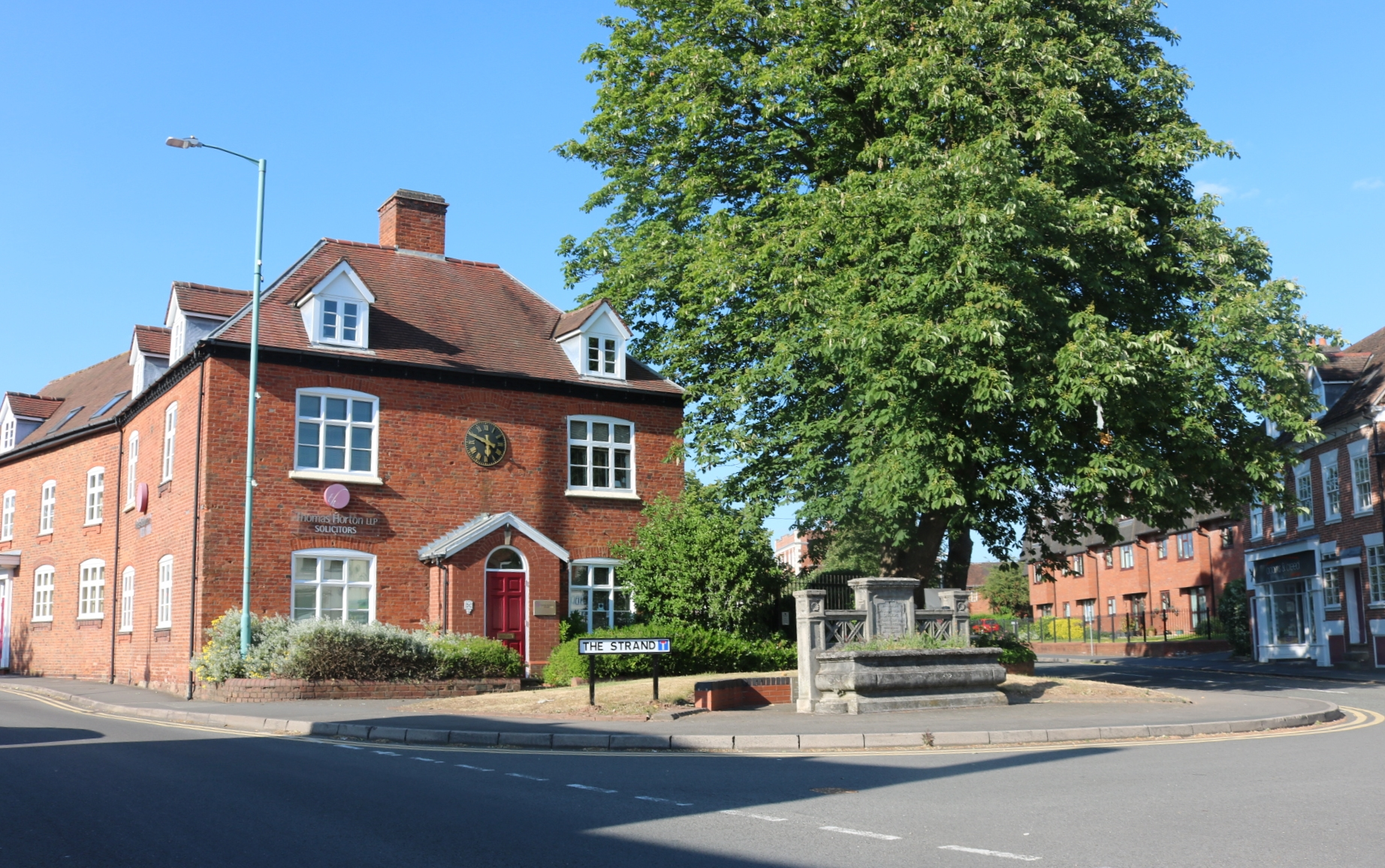
- The Strand, Bromsgrove

- Location within Worcestershire
- Population: 34,755 (Built-up area, 2021)
- OS grid reference: SO960708
  - London: 119 miles (192 km) SE
- District: Bromsgrove
- Shire county: Worcestershire
- Region: West Midlands
- Country: England
- Sovereign state: United Kingdom
- Post town: BROMSGROVE
- Postcode district: B60, B61
- Dialling code: 01527
- Police: West Mercia
- Fire: Hereford and Worcester
- Ambulance: West Midlands
- UK Parliament: Bromsgrove

Bromsgrove is a town in Worcestershire, England, about 16 miles (26 km) north-east of Worcester and 13 miles (21 km) south-west of Birmingham city centre. It had a population of 34,755 in at the 2021 census. It gives its name to the wider Bromsgrove District, of which it is the largest town and administrative centre. In the Middle Ages, it was a small market town, primarily producing cloth through the early modern period. In the eighteenth and nineteenth centuries, it became a major centre for nail making.

== History ==
=== Anglo-Saxon ===
Bromsgrove is first documented in the early ninth century as Bremesgraf. An Anglo-Saxon Chronicle entry for 909 AD mentions a Bremesburh; possibly also referring to Bromsgrove. The Domesday Book of 1086 references Bremesgrave. The name means Bremi's grove. (Note: Bremi being an Anglo-Saxon personal name) The grove element may refer to the supply of wood to Droitwich for the salt pans.

During the Anglo-Saxon period, the Bromsgrove area had a woodland economy; including hunting, maintenance of haies and pig farming. At the time of Edward the Confessor, the manor of Bromsgrove is known to have been held by Earl Edwin, who became Earl of Mercia in 1062.

=== Norman and medieval ===
After the Norman conquest, the manor that later held the town of Bromsgrove was held by the King. The royal manor of Bromsgrove and King's Norton covered 23,000 acres (9,300 ha) from Woodcote to Deritend. Among the manor's possessions were thirteen salt pans at Droitwich, with three workers, producing 300 mits. The king had the right to sell the salt from his pans before any other salt in the town.

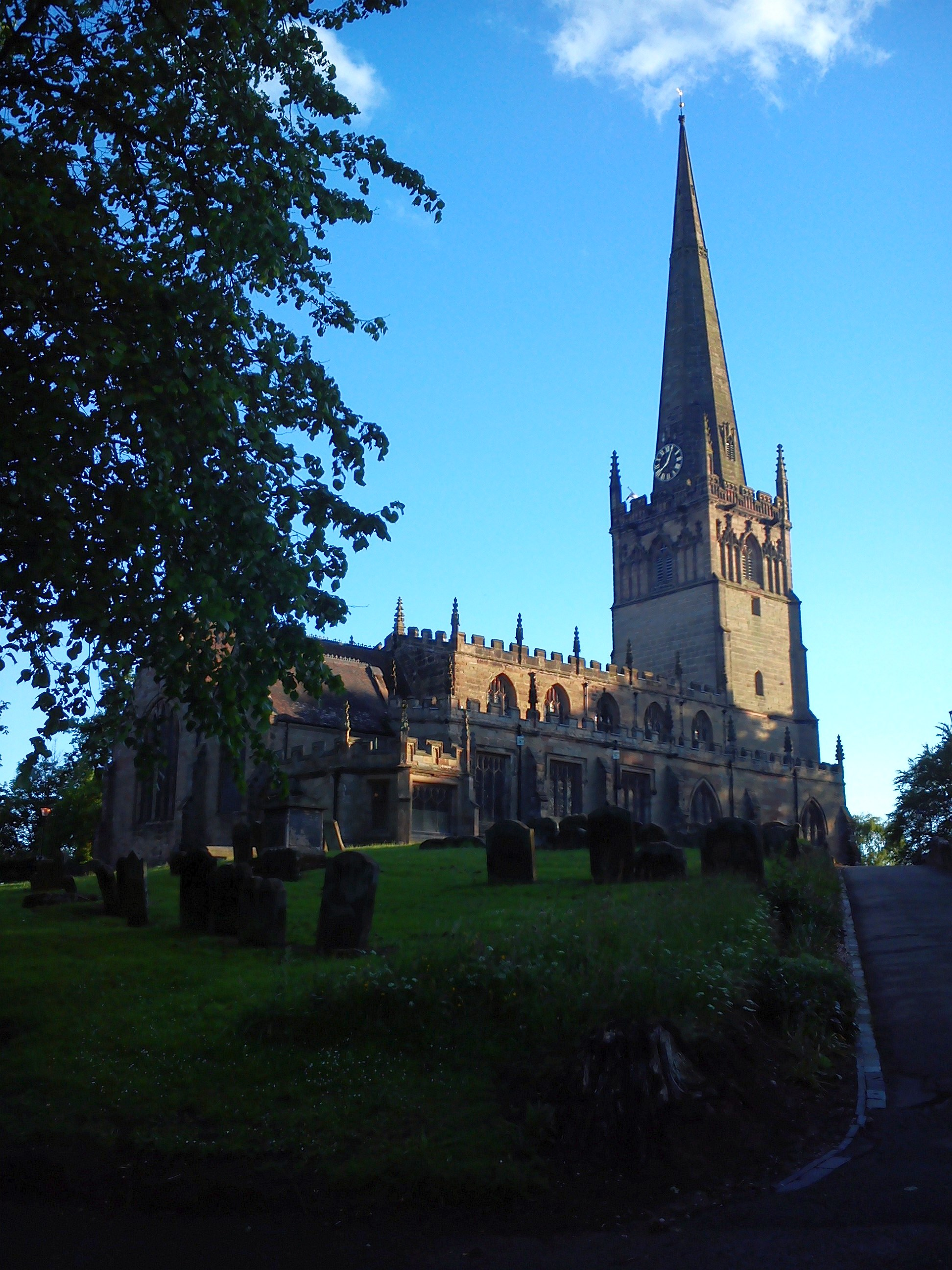
Parish church of St John the Baptist

Bromsgrove is sited at the centre of a very large parish, with its church, St John the Baptist, standing at a prominent point in the local landscape. (Note: The size of the parish and location of the church has led to suggestions that it was of minster status, although this is now disputed, see for instance Dyer 2000, pp. 10–11.) Bromsgrove, along with all the towns in north Worcestershire, was committed to defending the city of Worcester, and is recorded to have contributed burgesses to Droitwich in 1086. There may also have been Anglo-Saxon or Norman fortifications in Bromsgrove, but no archaeological evidence remains outside the literature. (Note: The Anglo-Saxon Chronicle mentions a royal fort at Bremesbyrig in 910, but it is uncertain whether this can be identified with Bromsgrove. Dyer 2000, p. 11)

Bromsgrove and the surrounding area was put under forest law when the boundaries of Feckenham Forest were extended hugely by Henry II. Forest law was removed from the Bromsgrove area in 1301 in the reign of Edward I, when the boundaries were moved back.

Bromsgrove was one of the smallest urban settlements in the county, and had no formal status as a borough. A market day was first granted in 1200; however, even at this time, there is little record of an urban settlement. Later, in the 1230s, Henry III arranged that the rectory manor of St. John was transferred to Worcester Priory, to support the remembrance of his father King John, who was buried there. This meant that the town which grew up around this period was divided between two jurisdictions and landlords, the royal manor in the east, and the rectory manor controlled by Worcester Priory in the west. The division ran along the High Street. Nevertheless, records show no sign of an urban settlement in 1240–1250. New initiatives to establish a market took place in 1250, and Bromsgrove residents appear in the tax records by 1275.

The town appears to have been founded as a series of plots of sizes between two and four rods (10 and 20 m), marked out along the current High Street. These plots can still be discerned today, in the sizes of the frontages of the buildings. The road entering Bromsgrove from the west appears to have been diverted to ensure that it met Bromsgrove at the furthest point north, forcing travellers to pass south through the whole High Street if intending to continue west.

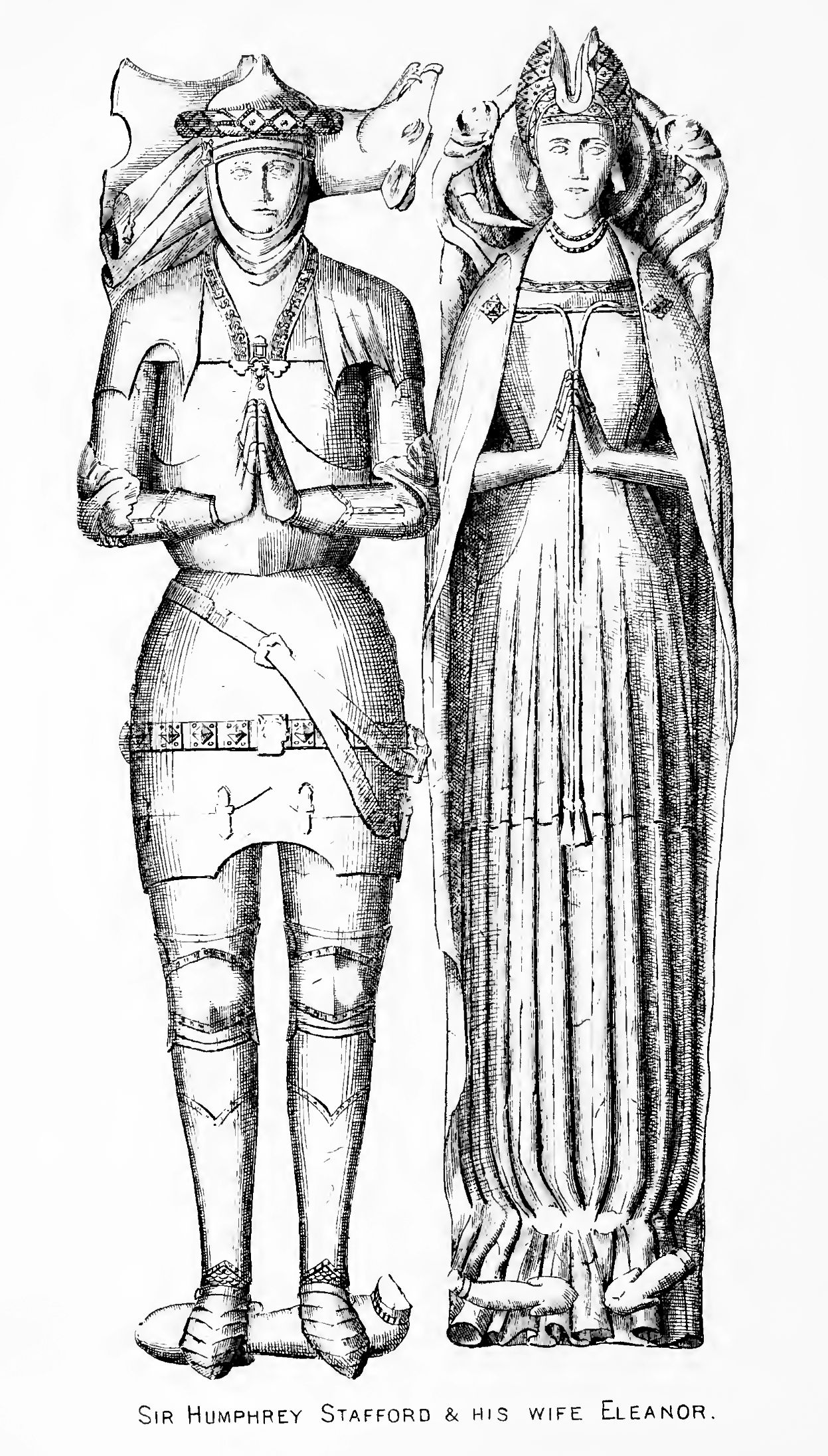
Stafford tomb, St John the Baptist Church, Bromsgrove: one of the most powerful families in Worcestershire, living just south of the town

The town probably benefited from the growth of the local agricultural population in the early medieval period, which began to establish new farmland in places like Stoke Prior and Hanbury through assarting (creating clearings in) Feckenham Forest. Similarly, the number of minor aristocratic, gentry and ecclesiastical estates grew, which would have needed to buy and sell goods. Hanbury alone had six manor houses and two granges in the 1200s. The Priory Manor itself would have been a potential customer, as would Grafton Manor just south of the town. Nevertheless, not all the local trade would have passed directly through Bromsgrove, as the Priory for instance would often take locally produced goods directly to Droitwich or Worcester, or purchase them directly at other larger centres with particular specialisms.

In 1317, it was given the right hold a Tuesday market and three-day fair every 29 August at the Decollation of St. John the Baptist. The market place and tollhouse were located at the junction of St. John Street and the High Street. Its market was especially used by the surrounding area to sell surplus oats, which were increasingly produced in the area, while wheat was grown in southern Worcestershire. The area was known for the high quality of its pigs.

Common trades can be traced from surnames in this period, and included in the years to 1327 bakers, tanners, carpenters, drapers, dyers, butchers, masons, smiths, shoemakers and fullers. The town had a large number of tanneries and cloth was also produced. Tanneries and breweries were located on the Priory manor side of the town, with access to the Spadesbourne brook. This created significant problems of pollution.

Bromsgrove benefited from sales to travellers, for instance of beer, bread, horsebread, meat and cheese. Brewing and selling ale seems to have been predominantly done by women in Bromsgrove, perhaps to supplement the main income of the household. Between 22 and 29 people are recorded in the 1300s at the Court Leet paying 'fines' for selling ale for more than the fixed price; this seems to have been applied in effect as a tax. Women were able to hold property, sometimes as widows or jointly with their husbands, and owned up to 10% of Bromsgrove's plots at various times.

After the Black Death, the social structure of the Bromsgrove's hinterland changed. Farms tended to merge and become larger, and moved from producing crops to raising livestock. This resulted in higher value goods like wool, leather and meat being sold through Bromsgrove's market and contributed to the town's prosperity in the later Middle Ages. The town's population would have fell, but can still be estimated as around 400 in the later 1300s. The aftermath of the Black Death also caused traders to attempt to hike their prices, which the courts attempted to suppress.

Even in later years, Bromsgrove did not grow a market in luxury goods, except for one haberdasher. Its markets did not compete with the larger centres for the highest value goods, such as wines or jewellery.

Church court records show that Bromsgrove had an urban underclass, including prostitutes and beggars. Assaults, murders and burglaries are also recorded. Servants, often young people, feature particularly in the records of disorderly behaviour. However, violence was not confined to the lower and middle orders; other courts issued warrants for the arrest of two of the Staffords of Grafton Manor in the 1401 and 1450, along with their followers, some natives of Bromsgrove, for politically motivated violence.

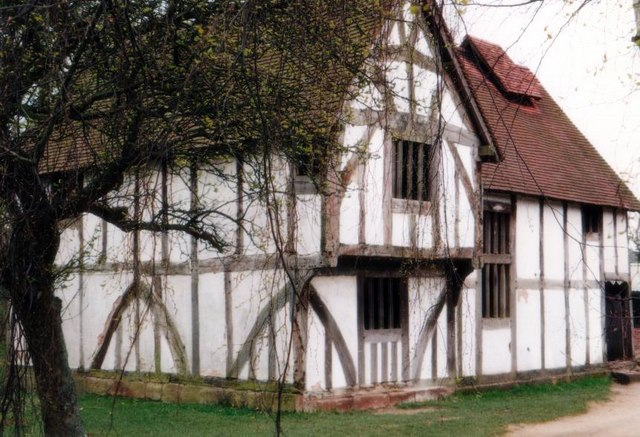
15th-century Merchant's House formerly located on Bromsgrove's High Street, now at Avoncroft Museum of Historic Buildings

Governance of the town itself is difficult to discern. Manorial records give evidence for courts, rents and fines, but do not present evidence about the organisation of matters that relate to the town itself, such as the maintenance of roads and other facilities. The main representative post appears to be that of Bailiff. The royal manor, with its Court Leet, dealt with the majority of financial matters including tolls and revenues from the market, after disputes with the Priory manor over rights to various revenues and fines were settled. The royal manor would therefore have paid for the upkeep of the market and the tollhouse, which also served at some points as a jail.

Christopher Dyer suggests that local societies may have grown up to deal with some of its organisational issues. There was for instance a guild in the town during the 1300s. There were three crosses erected in the town, and reports of well-paved roads in the 1400s, so Dyer concludes that the town's voluntary self-organisation seems to have been adequate to deal with its key problems.

Bromsgrove in the Middle Ages probably reached a population of no more than 600. It was not especially wealthy. Taxation records show that most families, even among the richest, had relatively moderate incomes, compared to other towns in the Midlands. It did, however, have an urban character, and attracted people into the town from the surrounding area.

=== Early modern ===
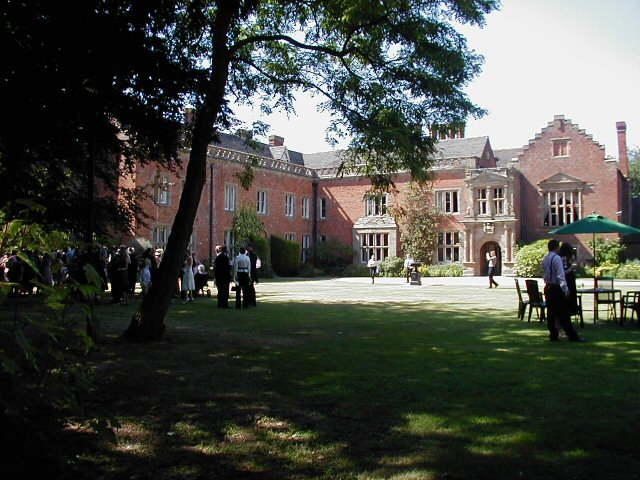
Grafton Manor, home of the Catholic Talbot family, holding leading military posts in Worcestershire's Royalist forces in the Civil War

By the end of the Middle Ages, Bromsgrove was a centre for the wool trade. Manufacture of cloth, particularly narrow cloth and friezes is first recorded in 1533. Nailmaking was probably introduced in the region in the sixteenth century and was taking place in Bromsgrove in the seventeenth century. It provided an alternative trade for the rural poor, who would initially have supplemented other work with the nail trade. (Note: There is however no evidence that the trade was introduced by the Hugeonots, as often stated)

At the Reformation, around 1540, the Priory Manor was given to the new Dean and Chapter. Tithe collection and rents would have carried on in a similar fashion.

One major change was the political fortunes of the Talbot family, who chose to remain Catholics. They were connected to the Wintours by marriage, with the result that they were suspected of involvement in the Gunpowder Plot of 1605.

==== Civil War, Restoration and dissenting religion ====
Bromsgrove did not play a major military role in the English Civil War, although it was a town involved in the support of the Trained Bands, the system of local militias used for law enforcement. In 1642, as preparations for war were made, Parliament surveyed the capabilities of the trained bands and documented that Bromsgrove had a store of munitions, including ten barrels of powder. The Royalists occupied the county in late 1642, following the Battle of Edgehill. In February 1643, Charles I ordered that Bromsgrove's vicar John Hall be removed from his post as a rebel.

The town would have been subject to the deprivations of the county in the wars, such as high taxation, pressing of men into military service and requisitioning of food and other property as armies passed through the area. For instance, in 1643, the Worcestershire Committee complained to the King about the "plunderings and abuses" of the Royalist troops of Sir Thomas Aston, which had made it impossible for Bromsgrove and other places to pay their monthly contributions. The following year, Parliamentary forces briefly imposed themselves on northern Worcestershire. In June 1644, General William Waller's force of around 10,000 men pursued the King's army across the county as it retreated from Oxford. Waller's army during June lived off whatever they could requisition, first in the Vale of Evesham, then Bromsgrove and Kidderminster.

The Talbot family who held Grafton became central figures in the county's military organisation under the Royalists. The promotion of Catholics and recusants like the Talbots was a source of controversy in Worcestershire, referred to, for instance, by the clubmen in their attempts to resist the demands of both armies in the later part of the first war. In the third civil war of 1649, the Talbots joined King Charles II at the Battle of Worcester with a force of local men and had a role in his escape. The battle was traumatic for the county, as the Scottish troops in support of Charles looted as they traversed the county. (Note: A story related by Charlies to Samuel Pepys has Charles II talking to a smith in Bromsgrove: see, for instance Fea 1908, p. 236 who however acknowledges that the King forgot the name of the "village" and the place name does not appear in the original notes; other recent research indicates the identification with Bromsgrove may be a mistake. See Escape of Charles II)

Afterwards, as some of the Scots dispersed trying to escape, further skirmishes occurred as they were arrested or killed. Local tradition recounts that Battlefield Brook and Battlefields Farm was named after one of the encounters, although it is unclear whether before or after. (Note: Another local tradition has King Charles II hiding behind a large chimney in Bromsgrove's Black Cross Inn during his escape. This is not verifiable.)

Disputes about the vicarage continued through the Interregnum and Protectorate. John Hall was vicar again until 1652. (Note: Hall at this time also brought his brother and fellow Presbyterian Thomas Hall to King's Norton (which was part of the Parish) as curate.) John Hall's successor John Spilsbury, previously a fellow of Magdalen College, was unpopular with some of Bromsgrove's churchgoers, who attempted unsuccessfully to eject him. Spilsbury was removed after the Restoration of the Monarchy in 1660, and left the Church of England by refusing to conform to the Act of Uniformity along with around 2,000 other Anglican ministers from the Commonwealth period. He was confined to his house, banished from the county and finally imprisoned for his non-conformism. The toll on his health may have led to illness and death. He did return to Bromsgrove, where he was annually visited by Hall's son, an Anglican bishop. He was licensed as a Congregationalist teacher in 1672 in Bromsgrove and died in 1699. (Note: Spilsbury married the elder John Hall's daughter. John Hall's son John became a bishop, the last with Presbyterian views. Spilsbury's son John led a dissenting congregation in Kidderminster, and in turn his son Francis Spilsbury became a minister at Salters' Hall in London.) A Congregationalist chapel was established in Bromsgrove in 1693.

==== 18th century ====
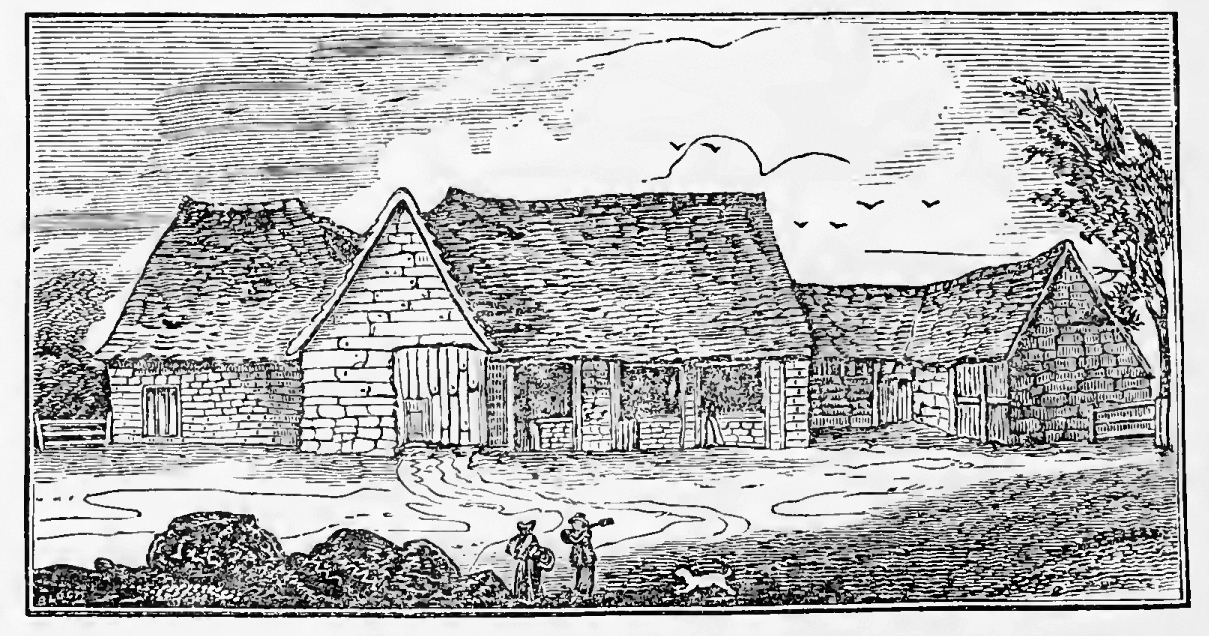
Tithe barn of St Johns, Bromsgrove, shortly before it was sold and demolished in 1844. It was used as a theatre in the 1700s. (Note: Performances may have included early touring performances from 1767 by Sarah Siddons, aged around 14 at the time, according to Cotton.)

Cloth manufacture fell into decline in the 1700s. By 1778, 140 hands (i.e., people) were employed in the manufacture of linsey and linen employed 180. By comparison, nail making employed 900 hands by this time and had become a thriving industry.

Market day changed several times over the period, settling on Tuesday from 1792 onwards. Fairs were held twice yearly, in June and October by the eighteenth century, with the modern pleasure fairs originating from the June horse and pleasure fair.

=== Industrial Revolution and Victorian ===
Dugdale described the town in 1819 as "a large and dirty place, full of shops and manufacturers of needles, nails, sheeting and other coarse linen." By 1897, Robert Sherard depicts a town that appears rather bucolic and "bright and sweet and clean." However, approaching the nailmaker's cottages, one could "pass in one minute from prosperous burgherdom to the lowest slavery".

==== Water-powered manufacturing ====
Bromsgrove and the outlying area along the Spadesbourne and Battlefield Brook had a series of around 14 watermills that supported small and medium-sized manufacturing. Some of these were corn mills, others processed linen and lint. These continued to provide employment through most of the nineteenth century, but declined towards the end.

Within the town, Cotton Mill was used for cotton and worsted until around 1830, reopening briefly in the 1850s. The 6-to-7-acre pool located in what is now Sanders Park was drained in 1865. It was a five-storey building, demolished in 1892. Near Charford, Moat Mill served as a flour mill with five grindstones until around 1913, and the Lint Mill, at what is now South Bromsgrove High School, was a corn and worsted mill. The Lint Mill closed after the Second World War.

The oldest mill, the King's Mill or Town Mill, had been part of the rectory manor. It was demolished around 1881.

==== Nailmaking ====
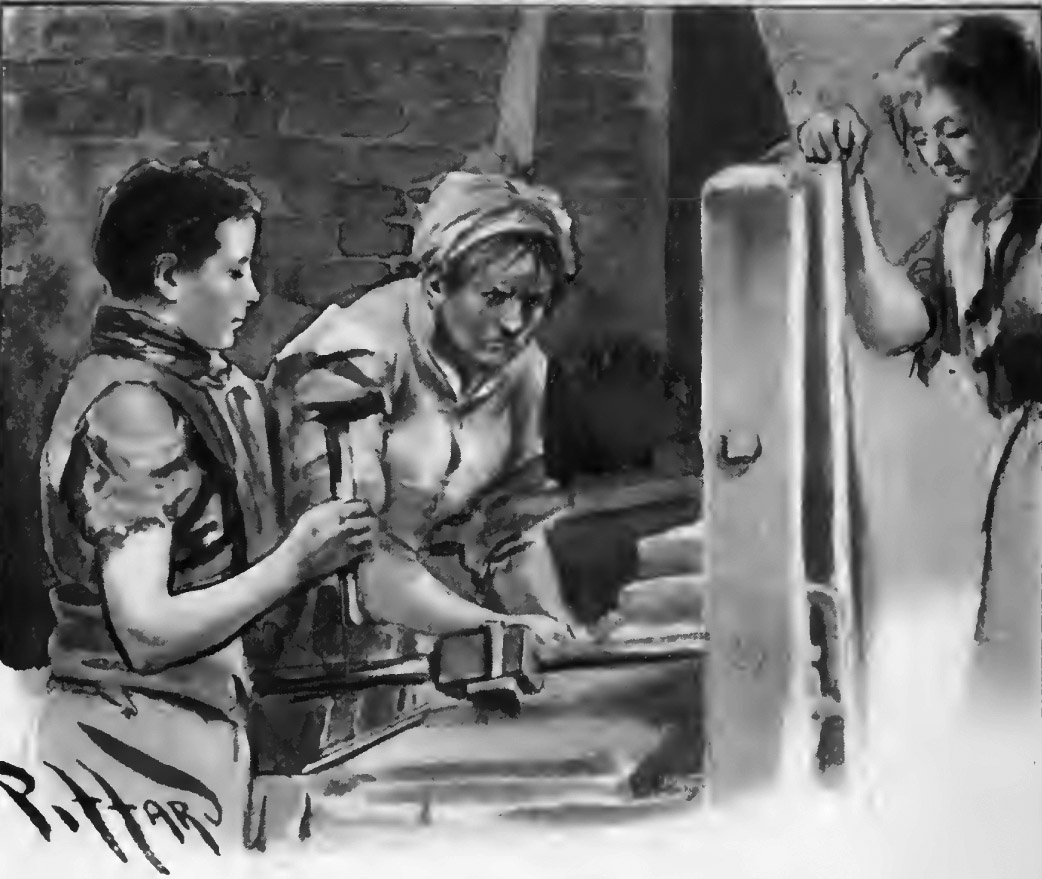
Nailmakers in Bromsgrove c.1896

Bromsgrove and the Black Country were centres of nail production, made by hand, usually as a family enterprise. Nailmakers in Bromsgrove lived in slum conditions in small cottages in courtyards off the High Street, and in Sidemoor and Catshill. Their sheds were attached to the cottages. As a result, the pollution and dirt was hard to control.

Nailmakers would purchase their iron from the nailmasters and sell their nails to nailmasters at set prices, effectively at a piece-rate. The basic technique of nail production did not change much, involving in essence heating iron rods, making a point, half cutting the nail off, fully cutting it and hammering a head. Simple nails might take a few blows and take a matter of seconds to make, while complex nails could involve twelve to twenty blows. Both men and women made nails, men making the more complex nails requiring greater physical effort, and women producing the simpler, smaller nails.

Mechanisation quickly put the industry into decline from the 1840s. Nailmasters resorted to measures such as paying workers in tokens, redeemable only at their own stores, to maintain their profitability.

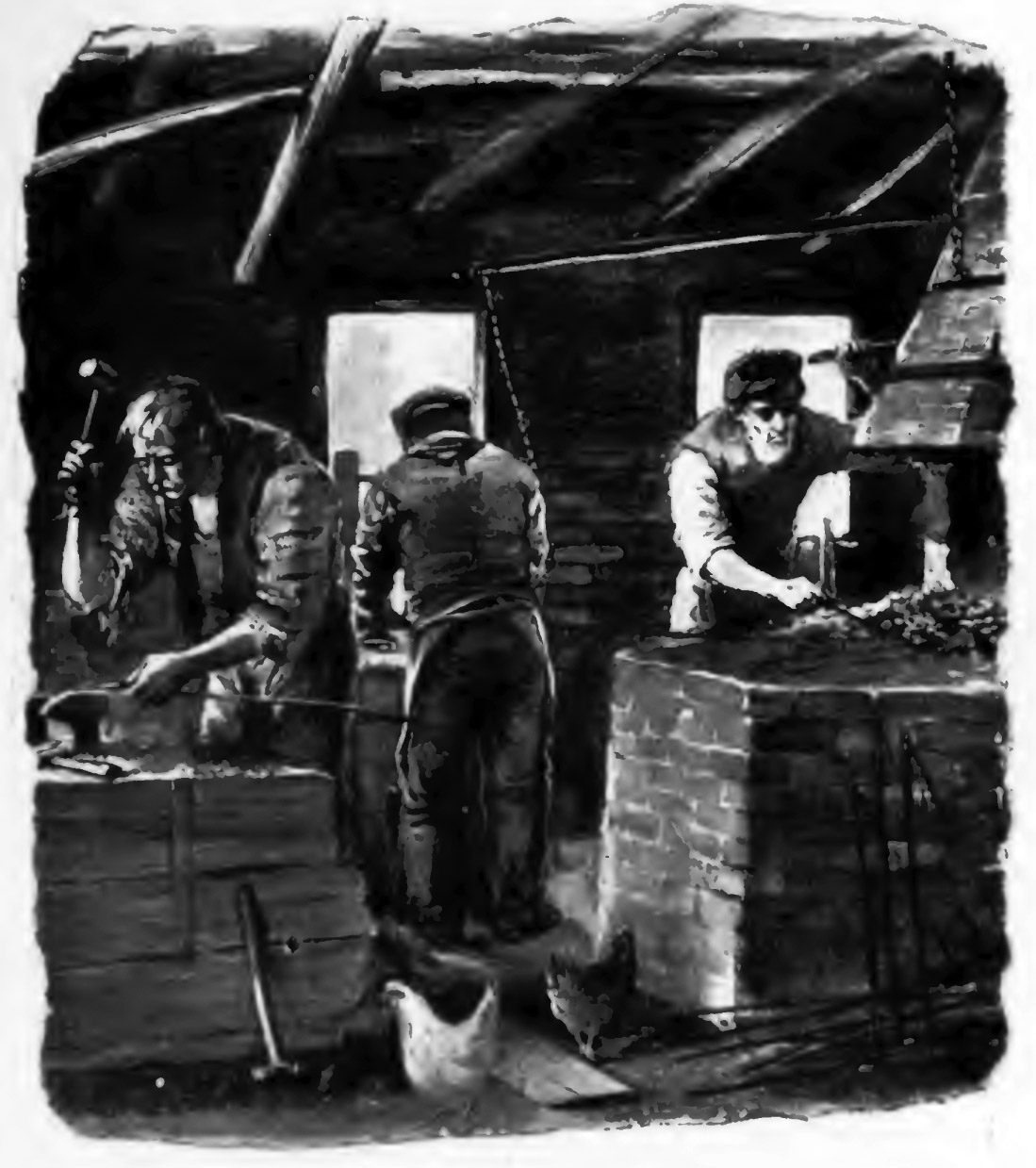
Interior of a Bromsgrove Nailmaker's shed in 1896; occupied by the tenant and two stallers, the latter worked each on his own account, and paid 6d. a week apiece and one-third of the firing. The oliver, or heavy hammer used for heading the nails, is attached to the bench in front of the little anvil.

The industry lasted longer in Bromsgrove, being the dominant occupation in the town through most of the 1800s due to lack of alternative work. As mechanisation took over, nailmakers produced nails that were still hard to produce by machine. Despite this, there was a great deal of pressure on wages, which became low, causing an industry-wide strike in 1842, when nailmasters attempted to reduce their purchase prices by 10%. Fifteen thousand nailers attended a meeting in Dudley Market Place, including around 1,500 from Bromsgrove. The nailers brought caltrops, known to them as the 'tis-was', to prevent the 6th Hussars from charging and breaking up their protest. The Hussars were prevented from breaking up the assembly. However, after ten weeks of strike, the nailers returned to work without any concessions.

Six more major strikes followed in the years to 1891. The longest three included a twenty-week strike in 1860, and a twelve-week strike in 1868. In 1869, a ten-week strike was caused after nail prices were cut by 20% in the 'Starvation list'. A meeting of 4,500 people at Crown Close led to the formation of a Nailers' Union. (Note: The union is mentioned as disbanded by Sherard 1897, p. 83) Nailers also vowed not to teach their children the trade, a promise swiftly broken due to the lack of alternative employment. Further strikes took place in 1877 and 1878 due to a further 10% cut. When Bromsgrove's nailers were offered the old prices, they returned to work, despite the fact that the Black Country nailers had not received the same offer, which caused much resentment. The Bromsgrove nailers continued to pay into the strike fund, however.

The poor working conditions prompted a Parliamentary investigation and report in 1888. Shortly after, a final 16-week strike in 1891–92 was supported by the Sunday Chronicle who paid £100 into the strike fund, and the chainmakers of Brierley Hill contributed a further £25. Events were organised and a soup kitchen provided, alongside strike pay. The nailmasters offered increased prices of 20% and eventually agreed 30–40%; however, the increased rates may have hastened the demise of the industry.

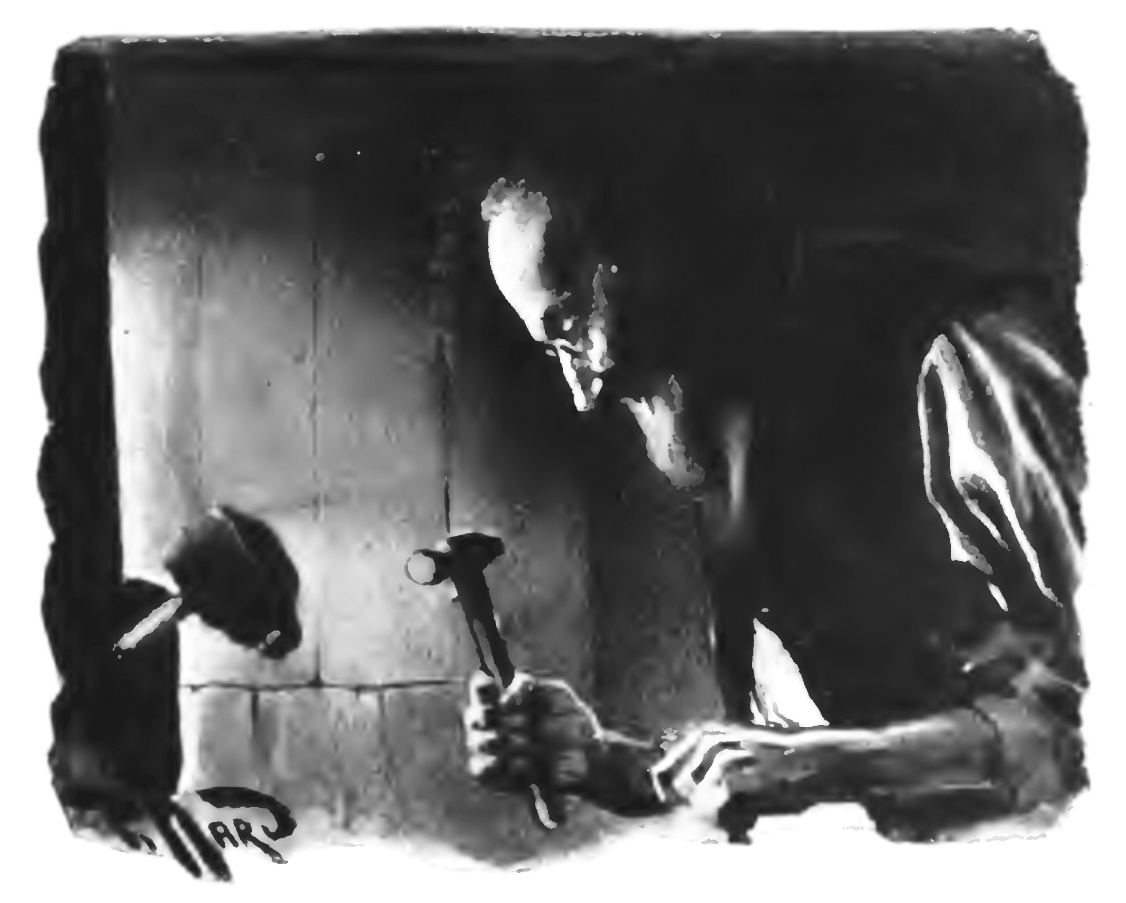
Seven shillings a week: this nailmaker in 1896 worked from 7 a.m. to 10 p.m., and turned out 11 lb of nails a week.

The industry featured in Robert Sherard's book The White Slaves of England in 1897, which includes a detailed picture of nailmaking in its final years. (Note: The book (Sherard 1897) was a collection of essays by Sherard previously published in the socialist-leaning Pearson's Magazine.) At this time, working weeks of 70–90 hours were commonplace and poverty still widespread. Their diet was typically bread, margarine and tea, with cheese as an occasional supplement, and sometimes meat. Chickens and pigs were often kept as another way to supplement their diet.

Nailmakers would often make supplementary income in the summer picking fruit at Dodford, at the former Chartist plots.

"Foggers", or middle men who typically owned general stores, would buy nails at a 30% discount from nailers, and often pay in tokens to redeem in their shops, despite the Truck Act, which had banned such practices. They were able to do this largely because they offered credit to the impoverished nailmakers. Nailmakers, even when supplying directly to nailmasters, were subject to arbitrary decisions. A particular grievance was that they would sometimes reject a week's work essentially due to oversupply, perhaps claiming the quality was low, leaving the nailmaker with no income and the need to purchase new iron.

Some found comfort in religion; Sherard quotes one as saying: "when I get to heaven I shall get my reward, and my Oppressor will get his". Hymn singing while working was common, and the Doxology was a particular favourite.

The industry finally declined in the early twentieth century, as jobs in the car industry at Longbridge and elsewhere became available. Most of the nailmaker's cottages were demolished in slum clearances in the twentieth century. (Note: Nailmaking cottages were concentrated around the lower part of the High Street, Worcester Street, Hanover Street and St John's Street, and in Sidemoor and Catshill)

==== Canals and railways ====
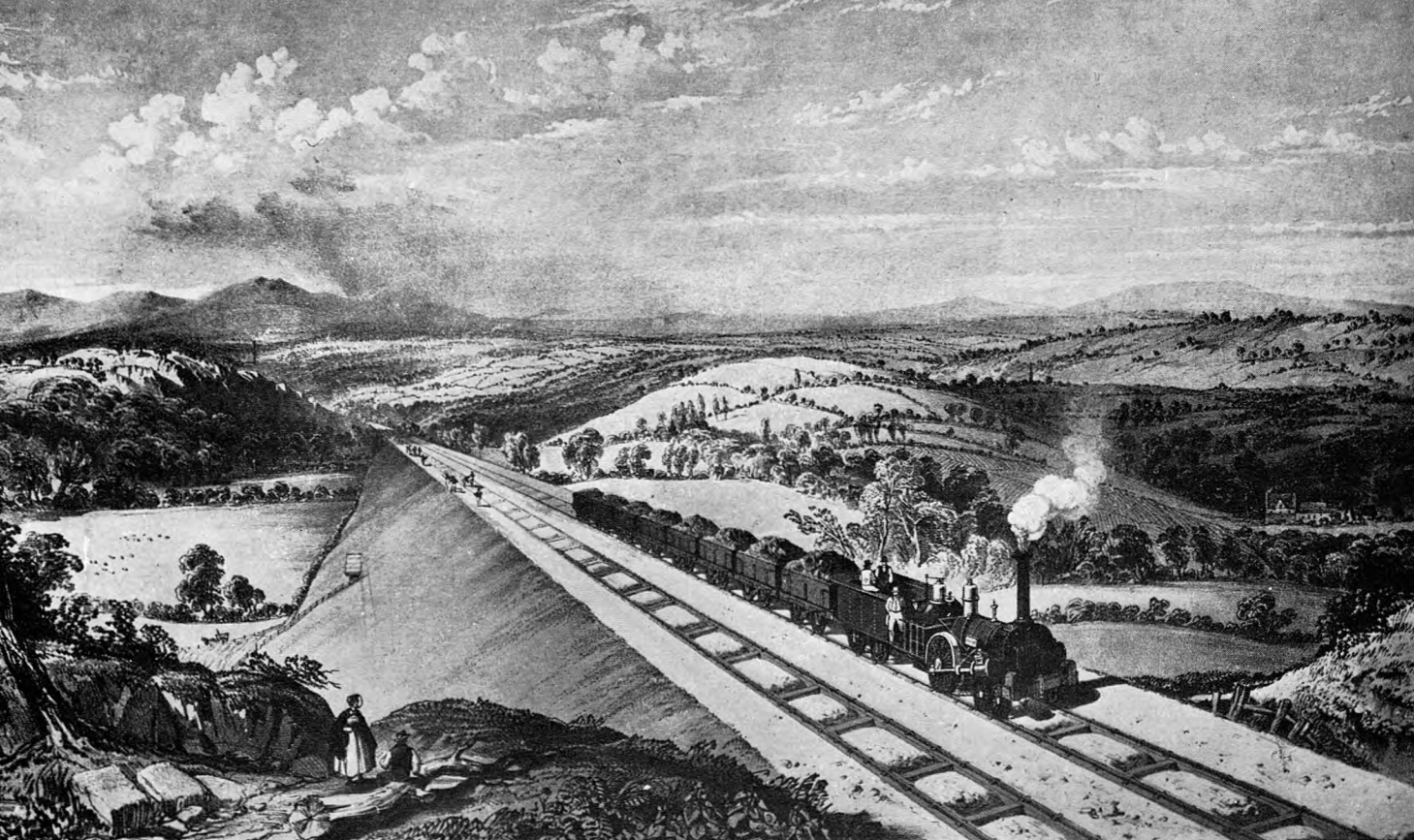
The Lickey Incline in 1840

The canals did not quite reach Bromsgrove's town, although several plans were made. The nearest points on the network were Tardebigge and Stoke Works on the Worcester and Birmingham Canal, built between 1792 and 1815. Canals did connect Birmingham, Droitwich and Worcester. Plans to add a link to Bromsgrove were dropped once the railways started to meet local transport needs instead.

The Birmingham and Gloucester Railway built the Lickey Incline, which opened in 1840. It was an engineering compromise, designed under protest by the company's engineer Captain Moorsom, to reduce the costs of construction by heading straight upwards, rather than meandering to take the gradient slowly. The design was mocked by leading engineers such as Stephenson and Brunel. The 1 in 37½ gradient imposed long-term costs on the operation of the railway, particularly the need for extra engines to push freight and passengers up the hill.

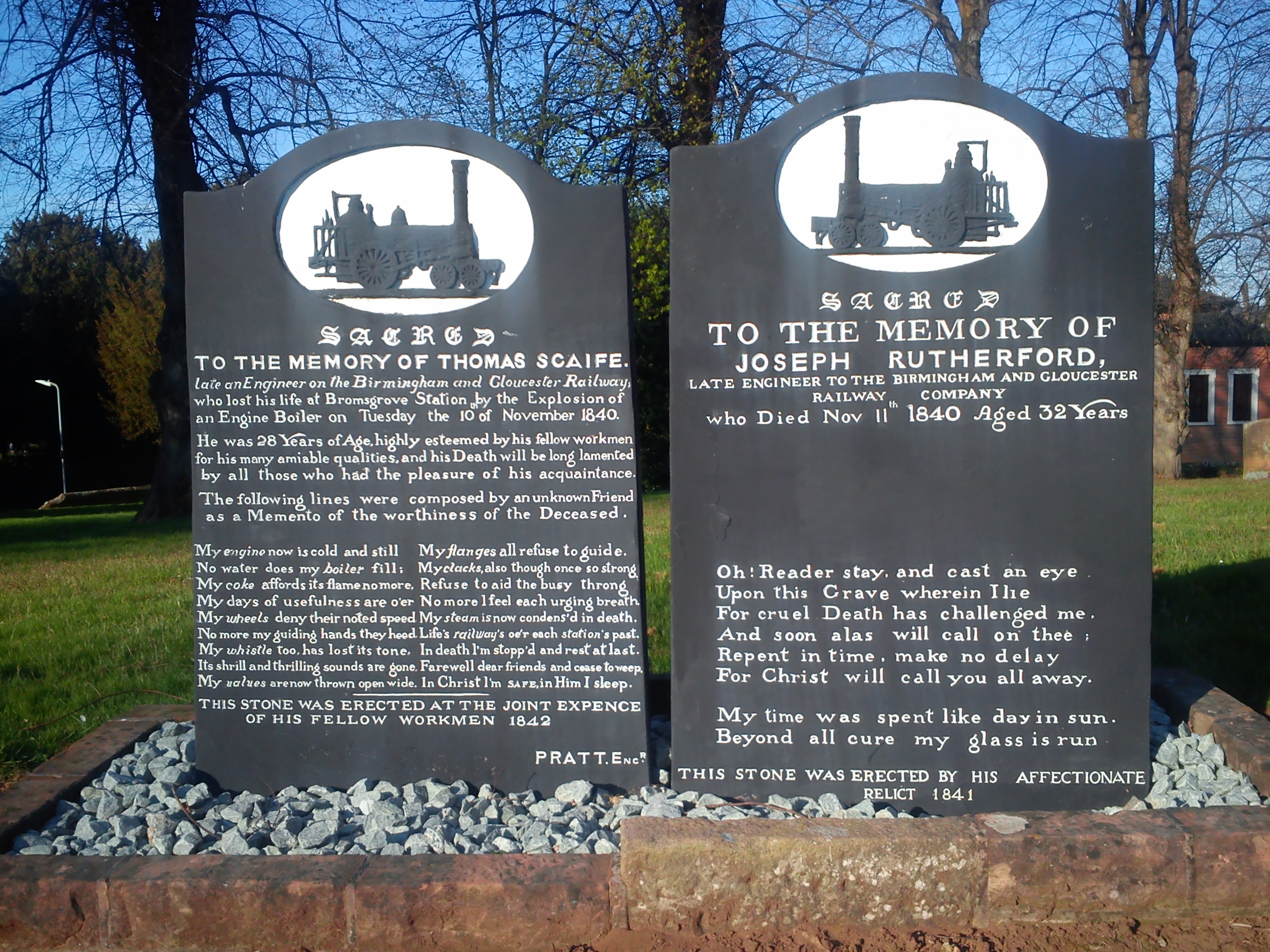
Graves of railway engineers Tom Scaife and Joseph Rutherford, killed in an engine explosion in Bromsgrove in 1840

Two railwaymen, Tom Scaife and Joseph Rutherford, were killed by an explosion that took place on 10 November 1840 while they were inspecting a steam locomotive named Surprise. It was being considered for sale to the new railway. One died instantly, the other a day later. (Note: Neither gravestone depicts the engine which blew up. Instead, the engines on the stones are (slightly inaccurate depictions) of Norris engines, which they would have been employed to work on.)

Another accident occurred at the nascent works in March 1841, when a botched repair caused steam to escape from one of the locomotives onto the drunken William Creuze, causing his death. The result was that the works were reorganised under a new manager GD Bischopp and a foreman recruited from Manchester, James McConnell. Working practices were very unsafe, as well as difficult and expensive, as a result of the incline and the previous mismanagement. McConnell took charge of reorganising the use of the line's engines. He introduced a number of innovations, in the face of a board that was intent on severe cost cutting, by presenting many of the needs he had as means to save money, which often they were. He also persuaded them to allow him to build a house to his own design, which stood by the old Bromsgrove station. (Note: The building was listed, but eventually was allowed to fall derelict and was demolished. It is pictured in Awdry 1981, p. 114)

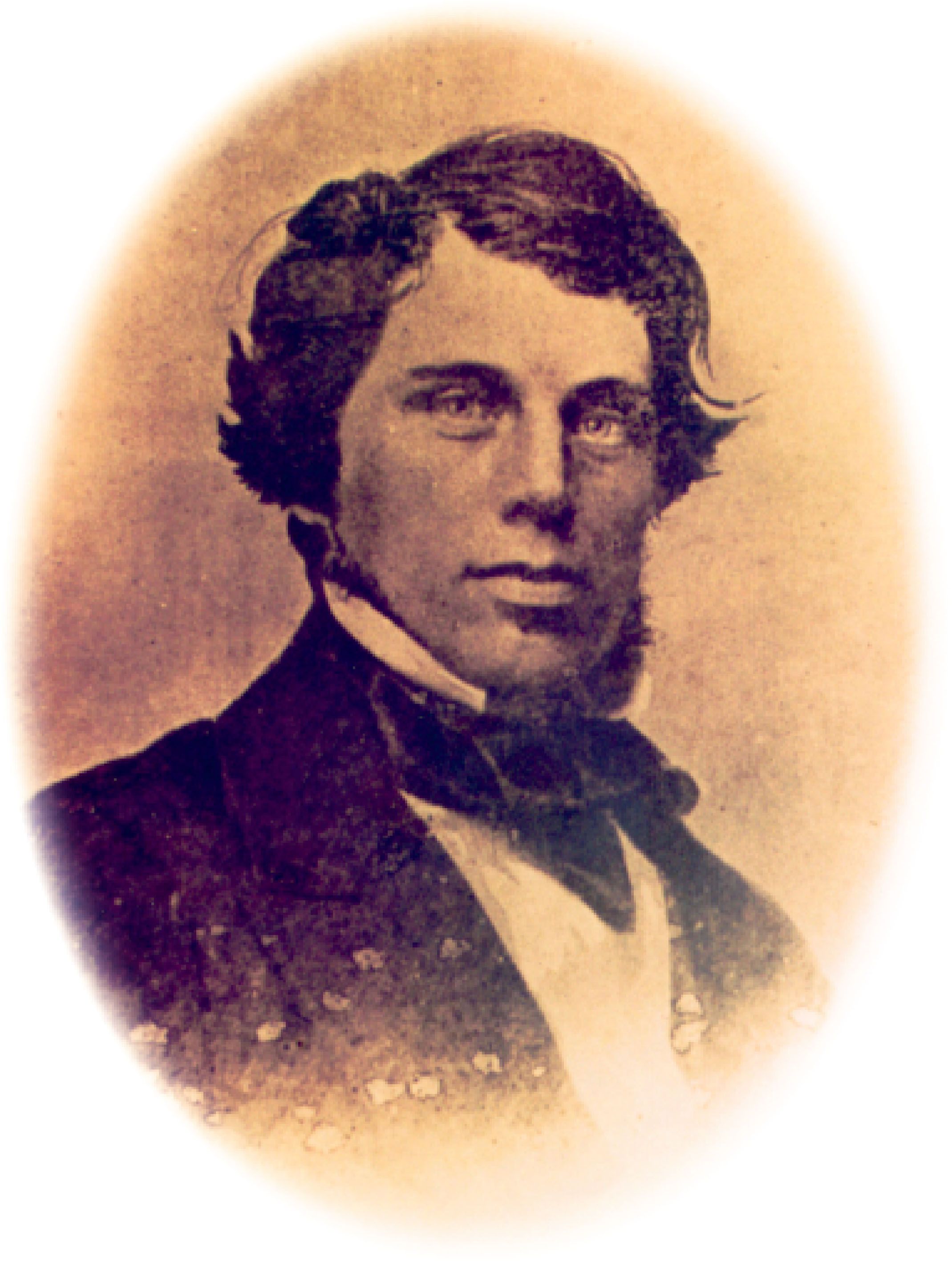
James McConnell

McConnell rebuilt some of the engines as saddle tanks as a cost-saving measure to remove the need for the bankers to haul engine tenders with them up the incline. In 1845, he built a new banker Great Britain, which became very well known among engineers, some of whom visited to view it in summer 1846. Probably after this, McConnell persuaded Stephenson and others to set up the Institute of Mechanical Engineers at his home in Bromsgrove.

McConnell left at the end of 1846. Bromsgrove railway works was then leased for a period, but later became a maintenance facility and wagon works for the Midland Railway. The works provided employment for many people in Bromsgrove.

==== Other industrial history ====
The Bromsgrove Union Workhouse, on the Birmingham Road, was opened in 1838 and closed in 1948 and is in use as an office building today.

==== Church and Chapel building ====
The expansion of Bromsgrove's population resulted in church building and restoration projects. Major restoration of the mostly 13th-to-14th-century St. John the Baptist church was carried out in 1858 by Sir George Gilbert Scott. St. Peter's Roman Catholic Church in Worcester Road was built by Gilbert Blount in 1858. All Saints Church was constructed by John Cotton in 1872–74.

The Congregationalist chapel at Chapel Street from 1693 was rebuilt in 1832. A Baptist Chapel was built on New Road in 1866–67.

=== Evolution of location government, 19th and 20th centuries ===
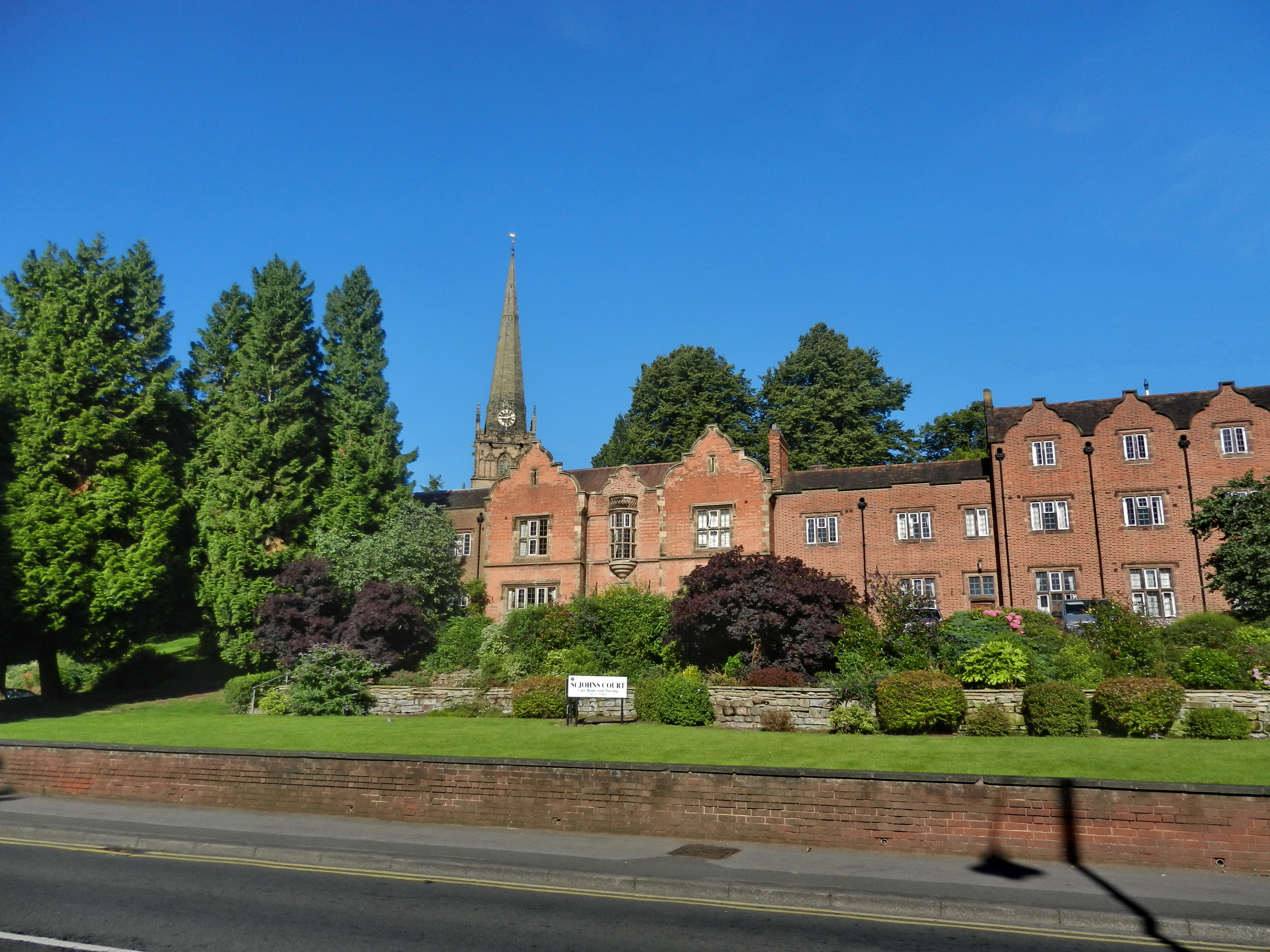
St John's Court: 19th-century vicarage, served as council offices from 1920s to 1980s, now a care home

Bromsgrove was an ancient parish, which covered a large rural area as well as the town itself. In 1846 a body of improvement commissioners was established to provide infrastructure and other local government functions for the built-up area of the town. The commissioners' district was reconstituted as a local government district in 1859, with the commissioners being replaced by an elected local board. A separate local government district covering the rest of the parish was created in 1863, known as "Bromsgrove Country".

Such districts were converted into urban districts in 1894. The Bromsgrove Country Urban District was renamed North Bromsgrove Urban District in 1896. It was subsequently abolished in 1933, being split between the Bromsgrove Urban District and several neighbouring parishes. Bromsgrove Urban District Council initially met at the Town Hall, which stood at the corner of High Street and St John's Street. The council moved to the former vicarage of St John's Church on St John's Street in the 1920s, after which the Town Hall was demolished. Bromsgrove Urban District was abolished in 1974, merging with the surrounding Bromsgrove Rural District to become the modern Bromsgrove District.

=== 20th century ===
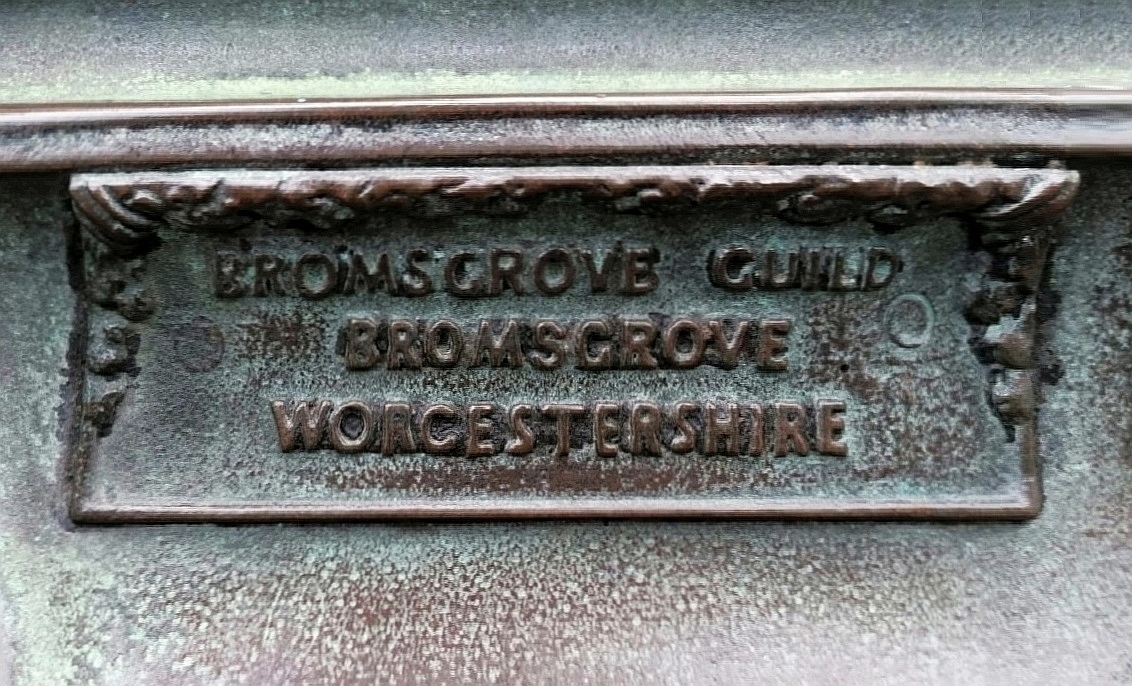
Bromsgrove Guild maker's mark on a main gate of Buckingham Palace

Bromsgrove was home from 1898 to 1966 to the Bromsgrove Guild of Applied Arts, a company of craftsmen who produced many fine works of sculpture, ironwork, etc., including the gates of Buckingham Palace (the locks of which are stamped with the Guild's name), the lifts on the Lusitania, the Liver Birds on the Royal Liver Building and the famous statue adorning the Fortune Theatre in Drury Lane.

Nearly all nail making had ceased by the 1920s, with the very last workers dying in the 1950s. The last of the water mills, the Lint Mill, closed by the 1950s. The wagon works closed in 1964, as a result of the Beeching rail reorganisation, the government's response to the shift to road transport. The site was demolished and cleared in the 1980s. (Note: The site is now a housing estate. One of the turntable pits still remains.)

During the twentieth century, many people in Bromsgrove were employed in Birmingham, for instance at Longbridge's car factory. Other allied employment came from Garringtons, a drop forge plant in Aston Fields, from the 1940s. Garringtons closed in 2002.

Motorways came to Bromsgrove with the construction of the M5 motorway to Lydiate Ash in 1962, and northwards from 1967 to 1970. The M42 motorway joining the A38 at the north end of Bromsgrove was opened in 1987 and in December 1989 the link to the M5 was opened. A relief road on the west of the town was built to direct traffic away from the High Street, and a bypass was constructed on the eastern side of the town allowing traffic to avoid the town centre entirely.

The town's population expanded rapidly from the 1980s to present, with new housing estates added to the south of the town, and infilling industrial areas such as the former railway works and Garringtons in Aston Fields.

== Governance and politics ==
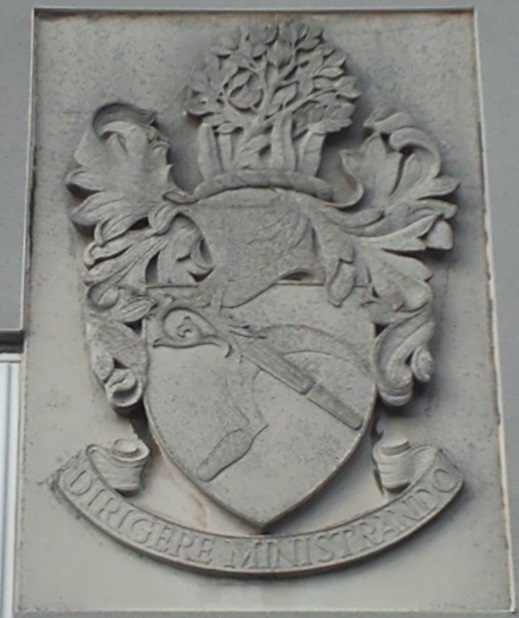
Coat of arms of the former Bromsgrove Rural District Council

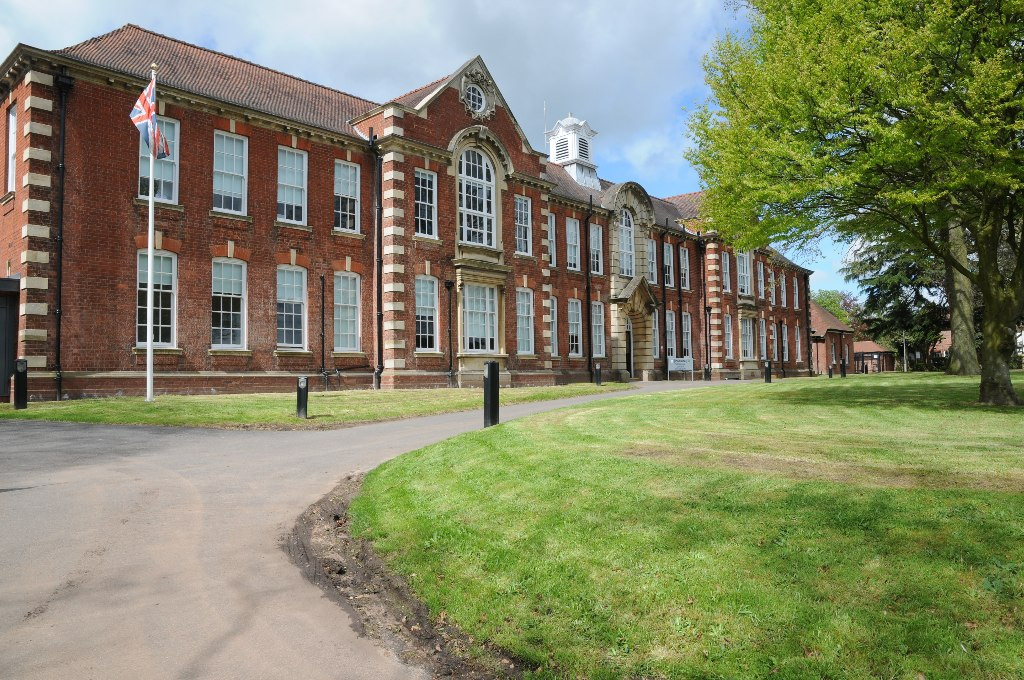
Parkside, headquarters of Bromsgrove District Council

There are two tiers of local government covering Bromsgrove, at district and county level: Bromsgrove District Council and Worcestershire County Council. The district council is based at Parkside, at the corner of Market Street and Stourbridge Road. The main part of the urban area of Bromsgrove is an unparished area, although the urban area does extend into the neighbouring civil parish of Stoke.

Bromsgrove's current Member of Parliament was elected in the 2024 United Kingdom general election, Bradley Thomas of the Conservative Party was elected to represent the Bromsgrove constituency, replacing Savid Javid. Albeit at a largely reduced majority. As a largely rural constituency with affluent residential areas, Bromsgrove District is a strongly Conservative-supporting area, with further seats being won by the party in the local elections at the expense of 'other' candidates.

The Bromsgrove constituency was last represented by Labour by Terry Davis, who defeated the Conservative Hal Miller as the result of 10.1% swing in a by-election in 1971. Miller was elected to the new Bromsgrove and Redditch constituency in 1974, and represented the Bromsgrove constituency from 1983 to 1992. He was succeeded by Roy Thomason, who was censured by the House of Commons Select Committee on Standards and Privileges for failing to declare loans made to him. He decided not to re-stand after the local Conservative Association opened nominations to other candidates. He was succeeded by Julie Kirkbride in 1997. She did not contest the seat in 2010 following the Westminster expenses scandal, in which she was found to have over-claimed by £29,243.

Bromsgrove has its own youth branch of Conservatives called Bromsgrove Conservative Future, a Labour Party and Labour club and a Liberal Democrat Party. Labour voting is strongest in the Hill Top, Sidemoor, Rock Hill and Charford wards of the town.

The town was also the host in the 2000s for the annual conference of the "Bromsgrove Group", an organisation of monetary reformers, campaigning against debt-money, members of which have been suspected of far-right links.

== Demography ==
According to the 2001 census, the population of Bromsgrove is 29,237 and the population for the larger Bromsgrove District is 87,837, which grew to 99,200 in the 2021 census.

In Bromsgrove, White British is by far the largest ethnicity, at 96% of the district population (87,837) with 4% (3,734) from an ethnic minority.

== Geography ==
The solid geology of Bromsgrove is that of the Triassic (late Scythian to early Ladinian) Bromsgrove Sandstone. It shows red bed facies and was probably laid down by rivers flowing through an arid landscape or in ephemeral, shallow lakes. The uppermost beds were deposited by a brief marine transgression. The soil is very good for market gardening and growing vegetables due to Marl bands. The district is at a general elevation of between 200 feet (61 m) to 300 feet (91 m) above sea level.

=== Climate ===
Bromsgrove experiences an oceanic climate (Köppen climate classification Cfb) similar to almost all of the United Kingdom.

Climate data for Bromsgrove
Month	Jan	Feb	Mar	Apr	May	Jun	Jul	Aug	Sep	Oct	Nov	Dec	Year
Mean daily maximum °C (°F)	7 (45)	8 (46)	11 (52)	13 (55)	16 (61)	19 (66)	22 (72)	22 (72)	18 (64)	14 (57)	10 (50)	7 (45)	14 (57)
Mean daily minimum °C (°F)	3 (37)	2 (36)	4 (39)	4 (39)	7 (45)	10 (50)	12 (54)	12 (54)	10 (50)	8 (46)	5 (41)	3 (37)	7 (45)
Average precipitation mm (inches)	37.6 (1.48)	25.4 (1.00)	24.3 (0.96)	32.4 (1.28)	27.1 (1.07)	35.8 (1.41)	31.0 (1.22)	38.5 (1.52)	39.9 (1.57)	43.8 (1.72)	36.7 (1.44)	33.1 (1.30)	405.6 (15.97)

=== Landmarks ===
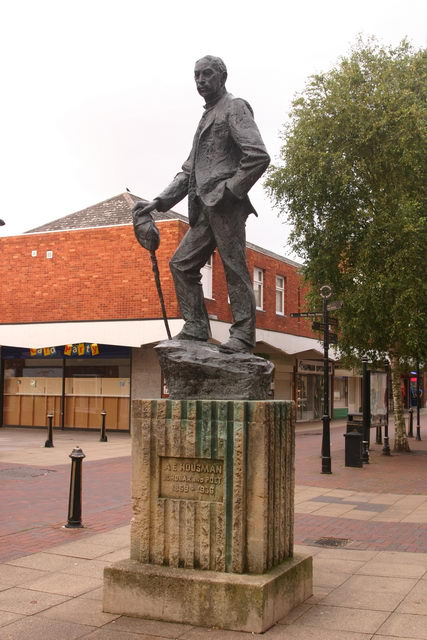
A.E. Housman, poet, lived at Perry Hall, Bromsgrove

There is a statue of Alfred Edward Housman in the high street, which was erected in 1985. There is also a sculpture of a dryad and boar in the high street, commemorating the work of the Bromsgrove Guild.

Bromsgrove is home to Grafton Manor which dates back to the 14th century. It has a rich history, with one of the daughters of John Talbot married to Robert Wintour, who was involved in the Gunpowder Plot.

== Economy ==
In 2004, 33,175 people in Bromsgrove District were in employment. Manufacturing, retail and services were the biggest sectors of employment in 2001.

Many of Bromsgrove's residents find employment in Birmingham, Redditch, Worcester and other places along the motorway network. MG Rover was a major employer of Bromsgrove residents until its collapse in May 2005. Bromsgrove is still home to LG Harris, a paint brush and decorator's tool manufacturer in Stoke Prior (known locally as "Harris Brush" or just "The Brush"). Business parks in Aston Fields and Buntsford Hill are helping to revitalise the local economy, in addition to newer developments such as Saxon and Harris Business Parks. Bromsgrove District Council is aiming to create a technology corridor along the A38 to take advantage of the area's road links.

== Facilities ==
=== Municipal facilities ===
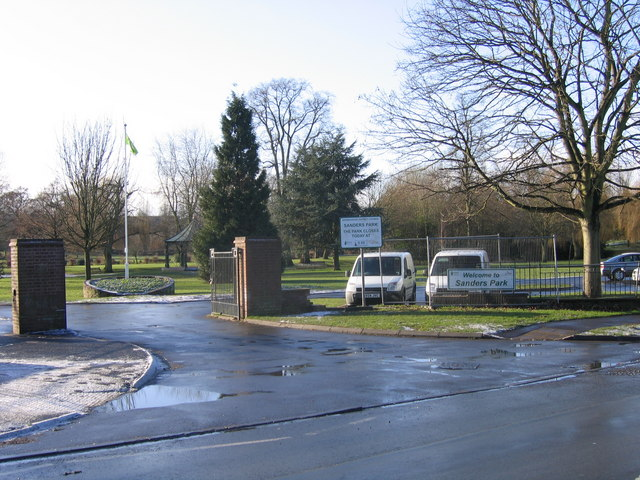
Sanders Park

Bromsgrove has a public community library situated in the centre of the town. The library offers not only books but also music CDs, spoken word, foreign-language tapes, and videos and DVDs for adults and children. There are 25 computers available with internet access.

Bromsgrove has a municipal park, Sanders Park. Facilities include: basketball courts, tennis courts, a skate park, children's play area and football pitches. A bonfire night is held annually with a large fireworks display and fairground rides. Other events are held such as big band afternoons featuring bands playing in the bandstand.

There is a large public leisure centre and sports centre in the town called Bromsgrove Sports and Leisure Centre, formerly known as The Dolphin Centre. It has two swimming pools and a large sports hall. Numerous activities and clubs are held here, such as the Bromsgrove Swimming Club. It is owned by Bromsgrove District Council. Formerly run by Wychavon Leisure, the management of the centre was handed over to Everyone Active in 2017 as part of a £13.7 million refurbishment and renovation.

=== Transport ===
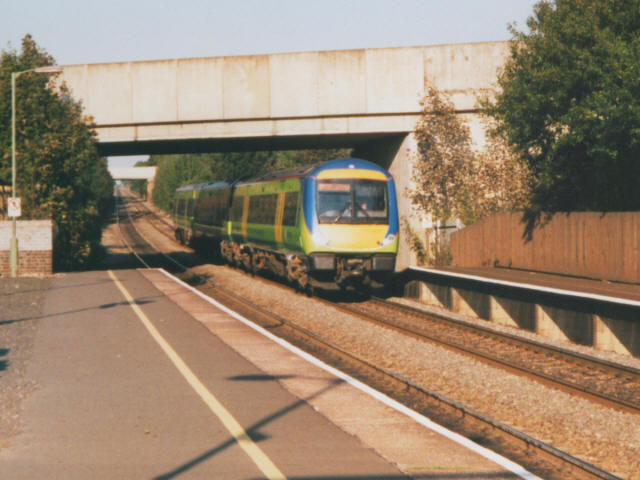
The former Bromsgrove railway station

Bromsgrove is intersected by the A38 which was bypassed to the east of the town in 1980, the M5 motorway borders the west side and the M42 motorway starts at the north of the town.

Bromsgrove railway station is situated to the south of the town. It sits at the foot of the Lickey Incline which is the steepest Incline on the British mainline network meaning most freight trains require assistance from a locomotive at the rear. Between 1919 and 1956 this was operated by a purpose built locomotive known by drivers as Big Bertha. There are frequent trains to Birmingham New Street, Worcester Foregate Street and Hereford. On 4 May 2007, Network Rail announced that a new station would be built, to replace the existing structure, at a cost in the region of £10–12 million. The station opened in July 2016. Following completion of the electrification project, Bromsgrove is served by trains on the Cross City Line towards Lichfield. (These services previously terminated at Longbridge.)

There is also a bus station adjacent to the High Street. Buses operate to Redditch, Worcester, Kidderminster, Halesowen and Stourbridge operated by various operators. However the historic bus service 144, between Worcester and which continued to Birmingham remains in the hands of First Midland Red, the successor to Midland Red. From 1 May 2022, service 144 terminates at Catshill and no longer serves Birmingham. The company stated that fewer passengers were travelling on the service into Birmingham and the section was no longer viable. National Express West Midlands introduced a partial replacement service from 3 May 2022 numbered 144A which ran between Bromsgrove and Longbridge every 70 minutes. This has since replaced by service 20 runs every 60 minutes between Bromsgrove and the Queen Elizabeth Hospital.

Bromsgrove is located on National Cycle Route 5 of the National Cycle Network. It is also the terminus of National Cycle Route 46. There are a number of public bicycle stands in Bromsgrove town centre. These are situated on the car park adjacent to the Queen's Head pub on the north end of town, outside Bromsgrove Library, on Chapel Street (opposite Lloyds Bank), on Church Street (next to the bus station) and on the southern end of the High Street, near to the Golden Cross Hotel.

=== Education ===
==== State schools ====
Bromsgrove schools use a three-tier education system (first school, middle school and high school).

Bromsgrove has 15 first schools in its district: Lickey End First School, Finstall First School, Charford First School, Dodford First School, Milfields First School, St. Peters Roman Catholic First School, Stoke Prior First School, Blackwell First School, Sidemoor First School, Catshill First School, Tardebigge CofE First School, Fairfield First School, Hanbury CofE First School and Meadows First School.

There are five middle schools: Alvechurch Middle School, Catshill Middle School, Aston Fields Middle School, St John's Church of England Middle School Academy and Parkside Middle School.

There are two high schools, North Bromsgrove High School and South Bromsgrove High School, opposite Charford. South Bromsgrove is a specialist school in foreign languages and I.T., noted for its extensive use of information technology. A previous headteacher, Philip McTague, was heavily involved in political action to reduce the gap in funding between Worcestershire state schools and others across the country. North Bromsgrove High School has now been classed for a specialist status in media and Creative Arts. Both were rebuilt by BAM in 2007.

==== Independent schools ====
Bromsgrove is also home to Bromsgrove School, a co-educational private school founded in 1553 with three campuses catering for pupils from nursery to sixth form that offers boarding facilities. Former pupils include Digby Jones, head of the CBI for many years and the actors Ian Carmichael, Richard Wattis and Trevor Eve.

==== Specialist schools ====
There are two specialist schools in Bromsgrove that support pupils with disabilities. One is Chadsgrove School and Specialist Sports College, and the other is Rigby Hall School.

==== Further education ====
Bromsgrove is the main site of Heart of Worcestershire College, formerly North East Worcestershire (NEW) College until 1 August 2014, following a merger. In May 2011, NEW College built a motorcycle academy with a £1.7 million grant from Advantage West Midlands; it has been extensively equipped by Harley-Davidson.

=== Sport ===
Bromsgrove is home to:

- Fairfield Villa Football Club. The home of community football in Bromsgrove.
- Bromsgrove Rugby Football Club, one of the oldest rugby union clubs in the country. It was formed on 28 September 1872.
- Bromsgrove Sporting Football Club. Bromsgrove play their home games at The Victoria Ground.
- Bromsgrove Cricket, Hockey and Tennis Club.
- Mercian Divers Scuba Diving Club – affiliated to the BSAC (British Sub-Aqua Club).
- North East Worcestershire Ravens rugby league club, who play in the Midlands Rugby League.
- Bromsgrove Indoor Bowls Club (also providing outdoor bowls) based in Charford
- Bromsgrove and Redditch Athletics Club, based at the Ryland Centre athletics track.
- Bromsgrove Swimming Club, established in 1966.
- Worcester City Football Club play their home games at the Victoria Ground, Bromsgrove.

=== Attractions ===
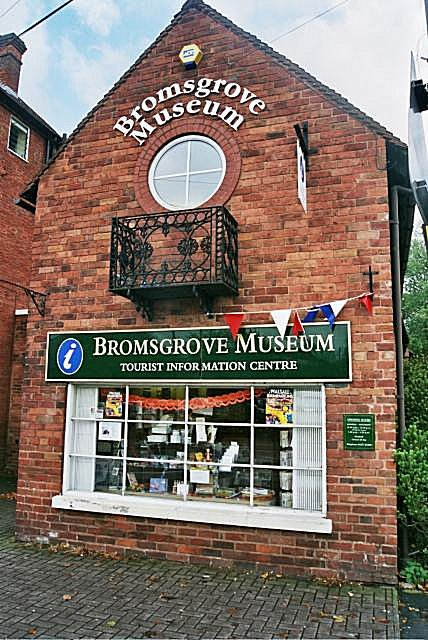
Bromsgrove Museum

Avoncroft Museum of Historic Buildings has its home in Bromsgrove. This museum includes the National Telephone Kiosk Collection. The Bromsgrove Museum on Birmingham Road reopened in May 2016.

The Worcester and Birmingham Canal which runs close to Bromsgrove, is a destination for leisure activities, such as walking and coarse fishing and there are several narrowboat hire centres situated in nearby villages. The Tardebigge lock flight, with 30 locks, is the longest in the UK. Bromsgrove is 5 miles (8 km) away from the historic country house Hanbury Hall, which is open to the public. The town's leisure venues include a nightclub featuring a mixture of styles, and pubs in the town centre include a Wetherspoons pub, a Slug and Lettuce pub and a number of traditional pubs. Bromsgrove is close to the countryside attractions of the Lickey Hills, the Clent Hills and the Waseley Hills.

== Entertainment and arts ==
Bromsgrove was host to a centre for the arts, Artrix, located on Slideslow Drive. Opened in 2005, Artrix was a multi purpose arts centre that provides theatre, cinema screenings of recently released films, National Theatre Live performances, rock concerts, folk music, comedians and classical music concerts from Bromsgrove Concerts, ESO and Midland Sinfonia. Artrix also has a vibrant youth theatre group and a new arts outreach team. From 2012, the dance studio has been converted to hold a maximum of 90 people and provides a space for intimate music, comedy and small theatre. The Artrix ceased trading on 7 April 2022, after being forced to close its doors because of the COVID-19 pandemic. In March 2023, it was announced that The Core, Solihull had been forced to close their auditorium after the presence of crumbling concrete, known as RAAC, was found, and that productions would move to the Artrix building, Bromsgrove, with Solihull Borough Council, who own The Core theatre leasing the building until then end of March 2024. Following The Core's departure, the running of Artrix was taken over by Bromsgrove Community Art, with an initial lease running from April to December 2024.

The 2015 World War II film Our Father was partially filmed on location in Piper's Hill Common outside Bromsgrove, and the 2023 film The Shamrock Spitfire was partially filmed at Avoncroft Museum and Hanbury Church.

North of the town, in the village of Fairfield, since September 2019 they have delivered Bromsgrove Arts, screening movies & event cinema at Fairfield Village Hall, and from October 2021 monthly live music & drama events, giving existing & emerging talent a stage to showcase their talents.

=== Bromsgrove Festival ===
Since 1960, Bromsgrove has held an annual classical music festival, with an international reputation.

== Clubs and societies ==
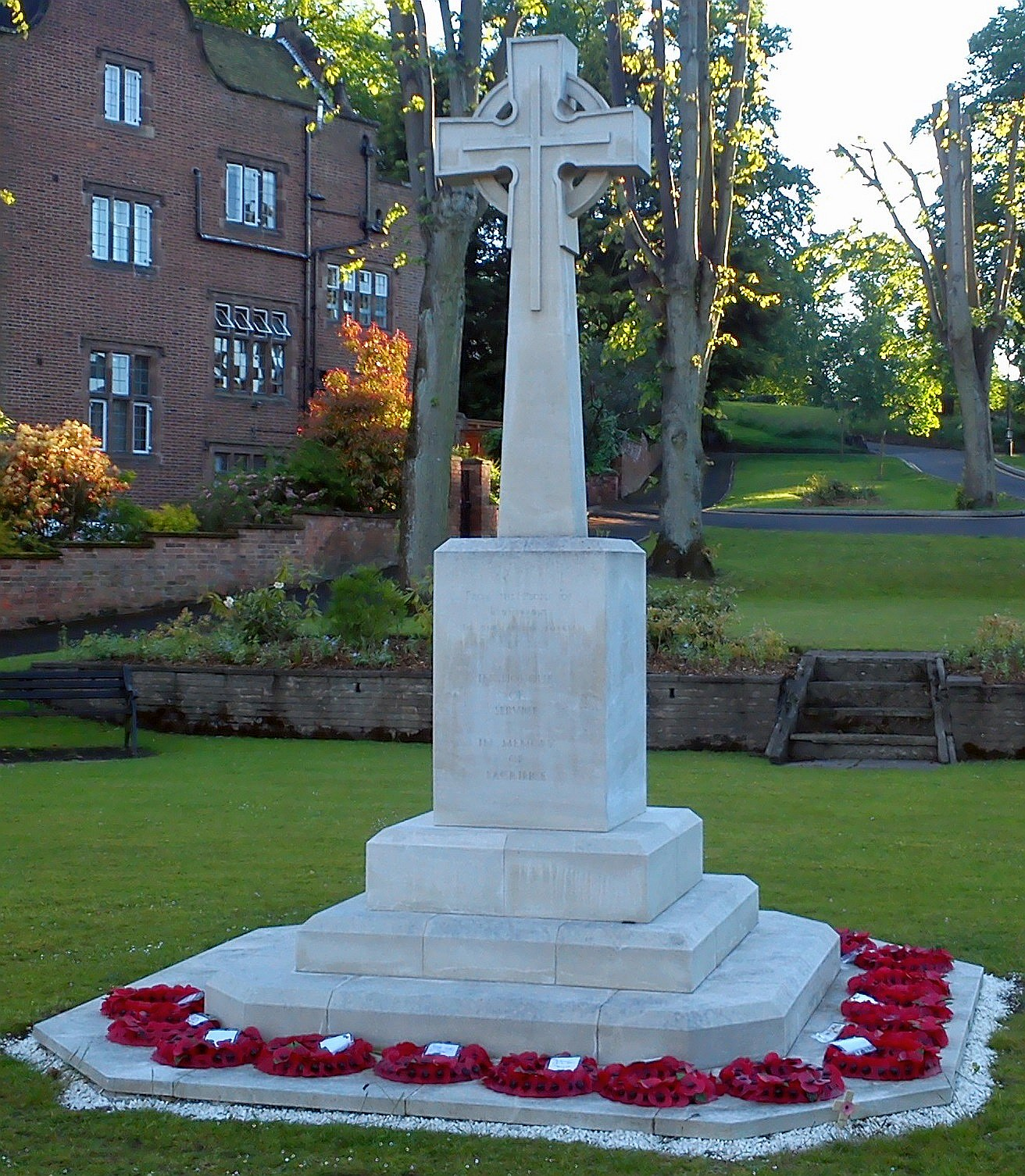
Bromsgrove War Memorial

Although with no official function, Bromsgrove's Court Leet continues to exist as a ceremonial body, being sanctioned under the Administration of Justice Act 1977. The Bromsgrove Society is a charity formed in 1980 to protect the built and natural environment of the town. The Bromsgrove Society of Model Engineers was formed in 1982 and operates a track at the Avoncroft Museum of Historic Buildings. The Bromsgrove Photographic Society was formed in 1950 and organises talks in Stoke Prior. Bromsgrove has a Rotary Club formed in 1936 and chartered in 1937.

=== Town twinning and friendship links ===
In May 1980, Bromsgrove was twinned with the German town of Gronau. A formal friendship link document was signed between Bromsgrove and the district of Saint-Sauveur-Lendelin in Normandy, France, in July 1999. Annual exchange visits are made by Bromsgrove and District Twinning Association members to each town.

Twinning

- Gronau, Germany

Friendship Link

- Saint-Sauveur-Lendelin, Manche, France
- (Republic of Ireland) Drumlish, Longford, Ireland

== Notable residents ==
See also: People from Bromsgrove District and People from Bromsgrove

The notable residents of Bromsgrove include those educated at Bromsgrove School (see People educated at Bromsgrove School). Among the Old Bromsgrovians are a field marshal, five winners of the Victoria Cross and one winner of the George Cross.

=== Medieval ===
- Richard Bromsgrove, Abbot of Evesham
- Sir Humphrey Stafford (c. 1427 – 1486) of Grafton, in the parish of Bromsgrove, executed in at Tyburn in 1486 for the Stafford and Lovell rebellion against King Henry VII

=== 1500–1700 ===
- Sir Gilbert Talbot, (died 1517/18), owner of Grafton Manor
- Sir John Talbot (died 1549), owner of Grafton Manor, buried in St John the Baptist Church, Bromsgrove
- Sir John Talbot (died 1611), owner of Grafton Manor, Catholic recusant suspected wrongly of involvement in the Gunpowder Plot
- Francis Talbot, who died as the result of a duel at Barn Elms with the Duke of Buckingham over his wife
- Anna Talbot, wife of Francis and famous beauty
- William Dugard, schoolmaster, author in English and Latin, and printer of propaganda, seventeenth century
- John Hall, Anglican bishop

=== 18th century ===
- Sarah Bache, hymn writer, born in Bromsgrove about 1771
- Charlotte Badger, considered to be the first Australian female pirate, born in Bromsgrove in 1778
- William Wells, Methodist preacher, emigrated to America

=== 19th century ===
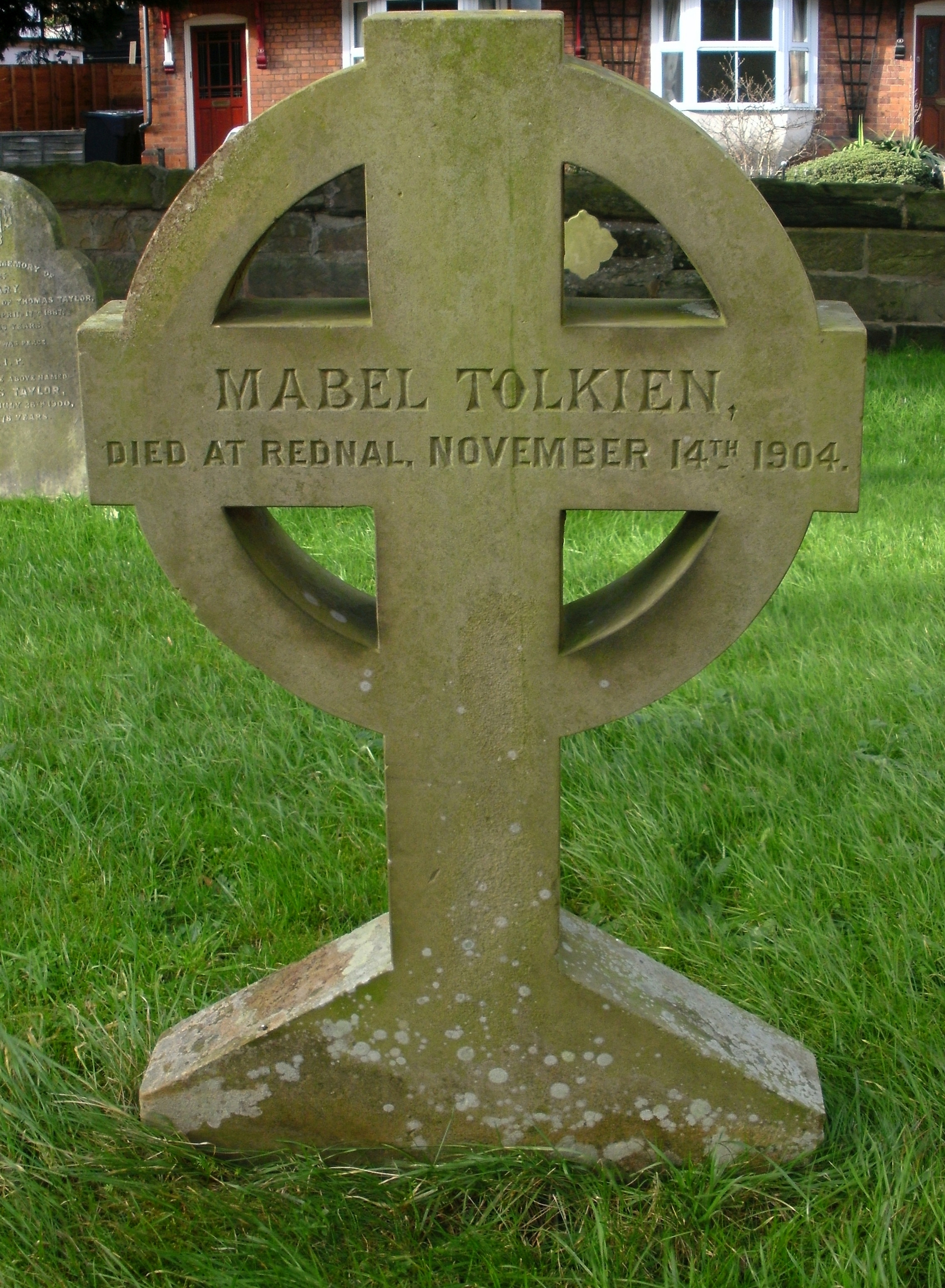
Grave of Mabel Tolkien (née Suffield, 1870–1904), mother of J. R. R. Tolkien, in Bromsgrove

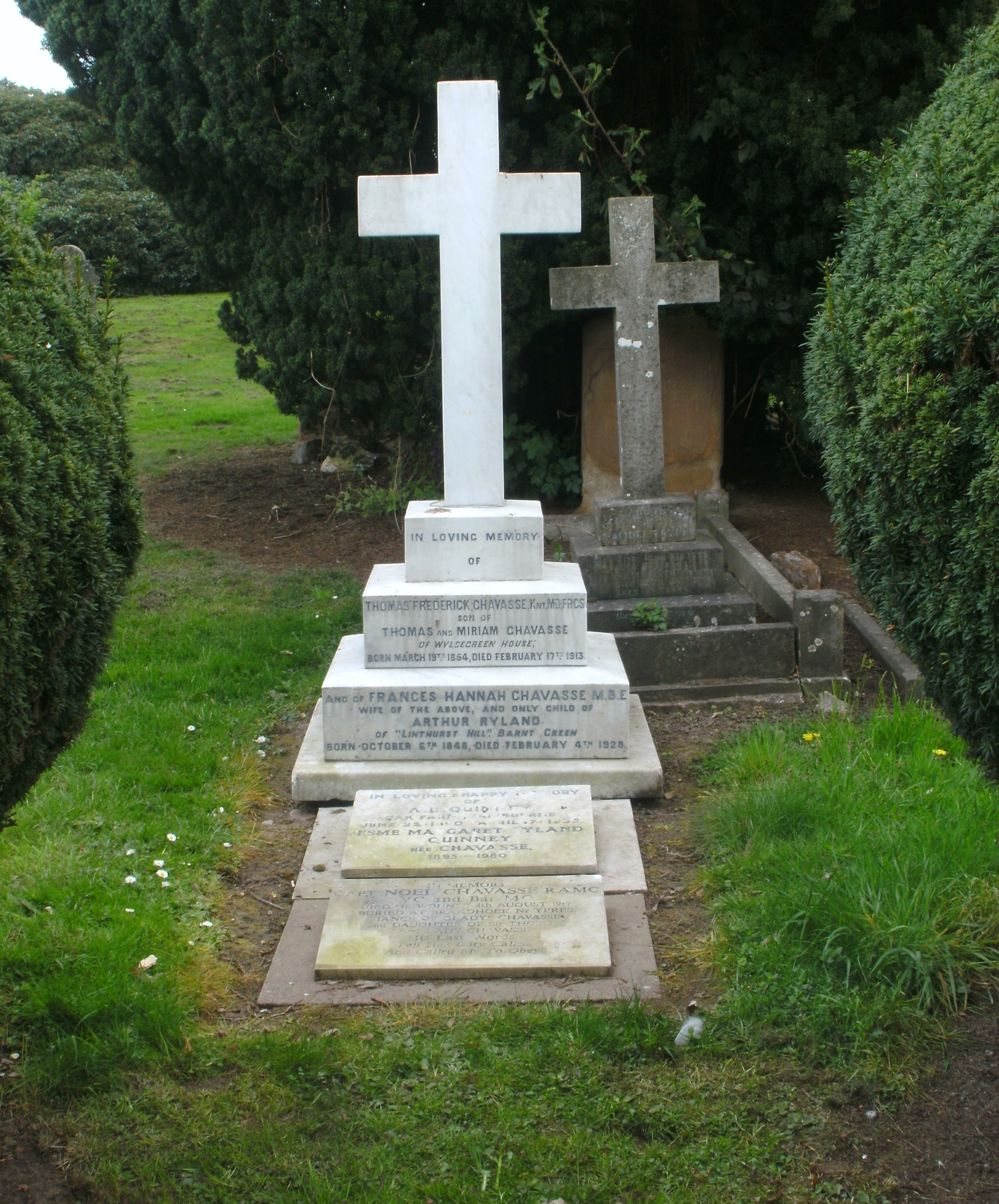
Grave of Sir Thomas Chavasse (1854–1913) and his family in Bromsgrove

- Benjamin Bomford, farmer
- George Cadbury, creator of Cadbury chocolates.
- Sir Thomas Frederick Chavasse (1854–1913) surgeon, member of the Chavasse family, buried in Bromsgrove. His daughter Gladys (1893–1962) was engaged to her cousin Noel Chavasse
- John Corbett, the Salt King, lived in Bromsgrove prior to building Chateau Impney.
- Alfred Edward Housman, classical scholar and poet.
- Clemence Housman, sister of Alfred, author and suffragette
- Laurence Housman, brother of Alfred, illustrator, playwright, writer and left-wing political activist
- John Lisseter Humphreys, Governor of North Borneo
- Benjamin Maund, botanist and chemist, publisher and bookseller
- Mabel Tolkien (1870–1904), mother of J. R. R. Tolkien, buried in Bromsgrove
- Elijah Walton, artist, lived in Lickey, died there in 1880

=== 20th and 21st century ===
- Singer/actor, Michael Ball, was born in Bromsgrove.
- England footballer, Jude Bellingham, lived in Bromsgrove
- Dan Bull, internet activist and musician was born in Bromsgrove.
- Isaiah Burnell (1871–1951), composer, music master Bromsgrove School.
- Eric Carter (pilot) (1920–2021), Royal Air Force pilot
- Nicola Charles, actress, was born in Bromsgrove in 1969.
- Lisa Clayton (born 1958), sailor, lived in Bromsgrove with her parents
- Jonathan Coe, author, was born in Lickey in 1961.
- Archibald John Davies (1877-1953), stained glass artist and founder of the glass studio at the Bromsgrove Guild of Applied Arts.
- Jimmy Davis (1982–2003), footballer with Manchester United, Swindon Town and Watford was born in Bromsgrove.
- Fyfe Dangerfield, musician, grew up in Bromsgrove and attended Bromsgrove School
- Nicholas Evans, author, best known for The Horse Whisperer, was born in Bromsgrove and attended Bromsgrove School.
- Declan Fitzpatrick was born in Bromsgrove.
- Craig Fagan, Hull City footballer. Lived in Bromsgrove in his childhood.
- Ben Francis (born 1992), entrepreneur and co-founder of Gymshark.
- Walter Gilbert (sculptor) of the Bromsgrove Guild
- Rear-Admiral Sir David William Haslam (1923–2009), Royal Navy officer and Governor of Bromsgrove School, died in Bromsgrove
- Geoffrey Hill (1932–2016) poet.
- Poppy O'Toole (born 1994), chef and TV and social media personality.
- Claire Perry (born 1964), businesswoman and Conservative politician, was born in Bromsgrove
- Anthony E. Pratt (1903–1994), the inventor of the board game Cluedo, is buried in Bromsgrove Cemetery.
- Mathew Priest, musician of the Indie rock band Dodgy.
- Pat Roach (1937–2004), wrestler and actor is buried in Bromsgrove Cemetery.
- Gary Rowett former professional footballer and former Manager at Birmingham City.
- David Rudkin, playwright, taught at North Bromsgrove High School in the early 1960s. His play Afore Night Come (1962) was inspired by his experiences in the countryside close to Bromsgrove.
- Alan M. Smith (born 1962), footballer.
- Andy Smith (born 1967), a professional darts player with a nickname known to fans as the 'pie-man', was born here.
- Trudie Styler was born in Bromsgrove.
- Jim Swire (born 1936), doctor and father of Lockerbie victim.
- Matt Teale (born 1975), newsreader and journalist was born in Bromsgrove.
- Sir John Vane (1927–2004), pharmacologist and winner of the Nobel Prize in Physiology or Medicine (1982); born in Tardebigge
- Jessica Varnish (born 1990), track cyclist.
- Reece Wabara (born 1991) former professional footballer.
- J. M. Wallace-Hadrill, academic, born in Bromsgrove
- Megan Walsh (born 1994), footballer for the Republic of Ireland national team
- Mark Williams (born 1959), actor, famous for portraying Arthur Weasley in the Harry Potter film franchise, along with the title character in the BBC's Father Brown television series based on the books by G. K. Chesterton.
- Russell Williams, Canadian serial killer, was born in Bromsgrove.

== Sources ==
=== General ===
- Townshend, Jenny; Hunt, Julian (2022). Bromsgrove: The Story of a Market Town. The Bromsgrove Society. ISBN 978-1-80068-623-6. OL 39218521M.

=== Medieval ===
- Dyer, Christopher (2000). Bromsgrove: a small town in Worcestershire in the Middle Ages. Occasional Publications. Vol. 9. Worcestershire Historical Society. ISSN 0140-9913.
- Humphreys, John (1919). "Forest of Feckenham". Transactions and Proceedings. 45. Birmingham and Warwickshire Archaeology Society: 115–132.
- Watts, Victor Ernest, ed. (2004). The Cambridge Dictionary of English Place-Names. Cambridge University Press. ISBN 9781107196896.

=== Civil War and Restoration ===
- Atkin, Malcolm (2004). Worcestershire under arms. Barnsley: Pen and Sword. ISBN 1-84415-072-0. OL 11908594M.
- Jones, John Andrews (1849), "Francis Spilsbury", Bunhill memorials, London: James Paul, pp. 259–260, OL 19672792M
- Calamy, Edmund (1713), "Bromsgrove, Mr John Spilsbury MA", An account of the ministers, lecturers, masters, and fellows of colleges and schoolmasters: who were ejected or silenced after the Restoration in 1660, by or before, the Act of Uniformity., vol. 1, London: Printed for J. Lawrence, pp. 772–73; read page 772 at archive.org
- Gordon, Alexander (1917), "Spilsbury, John M.A.", Freedom after ejection: a review (1690–1692) of Presbyterian and Congregational nonconformity in England and Wales, Manchester: University Press, p. 356 – read page 356 at archive.org
- Richards, Alan (1981). "A town trail". In Foster, John (ed.). Bygone Bromsgrove: an illustrated story of the town in days gone by. Bromsgrove Society. pp. 9–40. ISBN 9780950947143. OL 19606374M.
- Fea, Allan (1908), The flight of the king, London: Methuen, OCLC 4871077, OL 24614752M
- Pepys, Samuel (1966). Matthews, William (ed.). Charles II's Escape from Worcester. University of California Press.

=== Nail making ===
- Kings, Bill (1981). "Nailmaking". In Foster, John (ed.). Bygone Bromsgrove: an illustrated story of the town in days gone by. Bromsgrove Society. ISBN 9780950947143. OL 19606374M.
- Sherard, Robert Harborough (1897). "The Nailmakers". The White Slaves of England: Being True Pictures of Certain Social Conditions in the Kingdom of England in the Year 1897. London: James Bowden. pp. 81–107. OL 7094447M.
- Calcraft, Henry G. (1888). "Report as to the Condition of Nail Makers and Small Chain Makers in South Staffordshire and East Worcestershire, by the Labour Correspondent of the Board of Trade". Parliamentary Papers. XCI (385).
- Searby, P (1968). "Great Dodford and the later history of the Chartist Land Scheme" (PDF). Agricultural History Review. 16 (1). British Agricultural History Society: 32–45. Archived from the original (PDF) on 4 September 2011.
- Allen, G. C. (1928), The industrial development of Birmingham and the Black Country, 1860–1914 (PhD thesis), University of Birmingham

=== Nineteenth century industrial ===
- Briggs, Jonathan (1981). "The Watermills of Bromsgrove". In Foster, John (ed.). Bygone Bromsgrove: an illustrated story of the town in days gone by. Bromsgrove Society. ISBN 9780950947143. OL 19606374M.
- Burman, John (1981). Foster, John (ed.). Bygone Bromsgrove: an illustrated story of the town in days gone by. Bromsgrove Society. ISBN 9780950947143. OL 19606374M.
- Awdry, Rev W (1981). "Bromsgrove and the Lickey Incline: the railway revolution". In Foster, John (ed.). Bygone Bromsgrove: an illustrated story of the town in days gone by. Bromsgrove Society. ISBN 9780950947143. OL 19606374M.
