= Abaya =

Garment worn by Muslim women

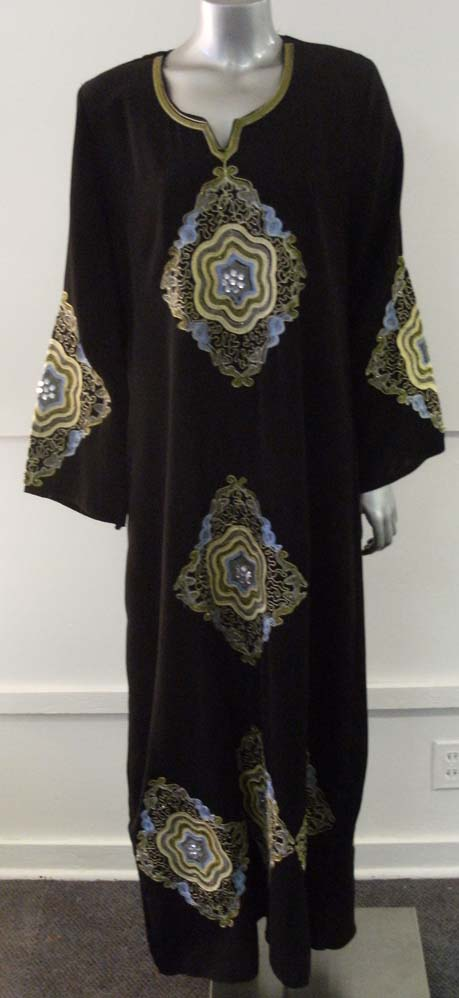
Black abaya

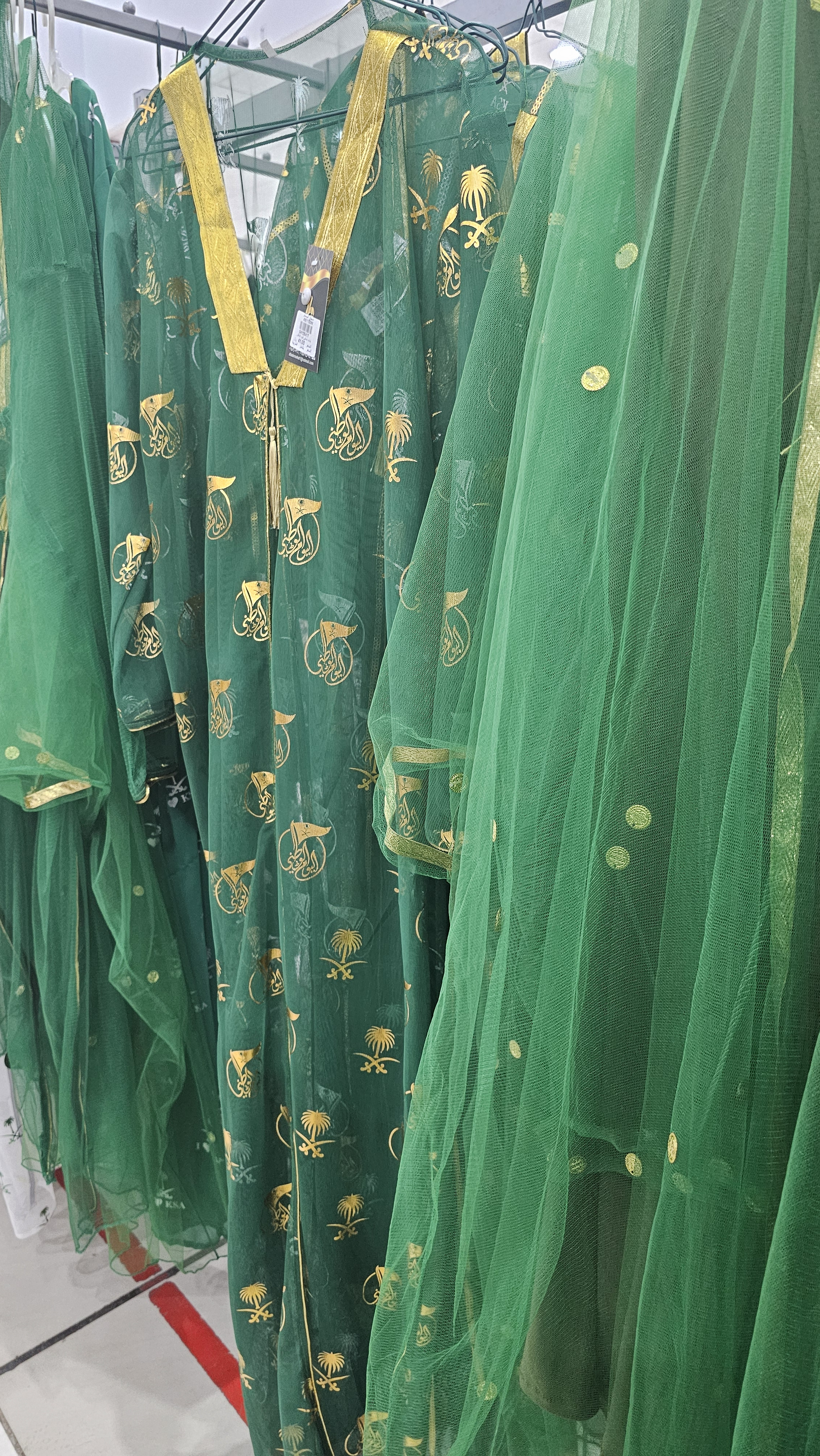
Abaya with embroidery

The abaya (colloquially and more commonly, Arabic: عباية ʿabāyah, especially in Literary Arabic: عباءة ʿabā'ah; plural عبايات ʿabāyāt, عباءات ʿabā'āt), sometimes also called an aba, is a simple, loose over-garment, essentially a robe-like dress, worn by some women in the Muslim world including most of the Middle East, North Africa, and parts of the Horn of Africa. Traditional abayas are usually black and may either be a large square of fabric draped from the shoulders or head or a long kaftan. The abaya covers the whole body except the head (sometimes), feet, and hands. It can be worn with the niqāb, a face veil covering all but the eyes. Some women also wear long black gloves, so their hands are also covered. Commonly, the abaya is worn on special occasions, such as mosque visits, Islamic holiday celebrations for Eid al-Fitr and Eid al-Adha, and also during the Islamic holy month of Ramadan.

== Rationale ==
The rationale for the abaya is often attributed to the Quranic quote, "O Prophet, tell your wives and daughters, and the believing women, to cover themselves with a loose garment. They will thus be recognised and no harm will come to them" (Qur'an 33:59, translated by Ahmed Ali). This quotation is often used to argue for wearing the abaya.

== Countries ==
Outside some states such as Saudi Arabia, Iraq, Yemen, UAE, Qatar and Pakistan the abaya is not widely worn by Muslim women. Abaya also refers to different garments in different countries. In Arab states of the Persian Gulf, they tend to be black.

=== Saudi Arabia ===
In Saudi Arabia, women were required to cover in public. However, in March 2018, the Crown Prince Mohammad bin Salman claimed that women could choose what to wear in public, provided it met certain standards, when he stated, "The decision is entirely left for women to decide what type of decent and respectful attire she chooses to wear".

==== Foreign servicewomen in Saudi Arabia ====
American military pilot Martha McSally was represented by The Rutherford Institute in McSally v. Rumsfeld, a successful 2001 lawsuit against the United States Department of Defense, challenging the military policy that required U.S. and U.K. servicewomen stationed in Saudi Arabia to wear the abaya when traveling off base in the country.

In 2002, General Tommy Franks, then commander of the United States Central Command, announced that U.S. military servicewomen would no longer be required to wear the abaya, although they would be "encouraged" to do so as a show of respect for local customs. Commenting on the change, Central Command spokesman Colonel Rick Thomas said it was not made because of McSally's lawsuit but had already been "under review" before the lawsuit was filed. McSally had been working to change the policy for several years and had filed the lawsuit after she had been threatened with a court martial if she did not comply.

Also in 2002, the U.S. Congress passed legislation prohibiting anyone in the military from "requiring or encouraging servicewomen to put on abayas in Saudi Arabia or to use taxpayers' money to buy them."

=== United Arab Emirates ===
Abayas are commonly worn in the United Arab Emirates. They are often made with fabrics such as crêpe, georgette, and chiffon and light colors like beige and white that are suited to the country’s climate.

=== Indonesia ===
The abaya in Indonesia takes on a unique style called the "jilbab." It is paired with a headscarf and is often brightly colored or patterned, reflecting the vibrant Indonesian culture.

Abayas are known by various names but serve the same purpose, which is to cover. Contemporary models are usually caftans, cut from light, flowing fabrics like crepe, georgette, and chiffon. Other known styles are front-open and front-closed abayas. Styles differ from region to region: some abayas have embroidery on black fabric, while others are brightly colored and have different forms of artwork across them.

== Abaya ban in French schools ==
In August 2023, French education minister Gabriel Attal said that abayas would be banned in state schools as they breached the "principle of secularism". On 4 September, the first day of the new academic year, French schools sent 67 girls home for refusing to remove their abayas.

== Influence of Western fashion in abaya designs ==
In the mid-20th century, the influence of Western fashion began to permeate the Arab world. This led to a significant transformation in abaya design. Whilst the basic silhouette remained the same, new fabrics such as silk, chiffon and lace were introduced. Designers began experimenting with colors, patterns, cuts and styles, blending traditional elements with contemporary fashion trends.

Gymshark and Leana Deeb released a modest fitness collection including abayas.

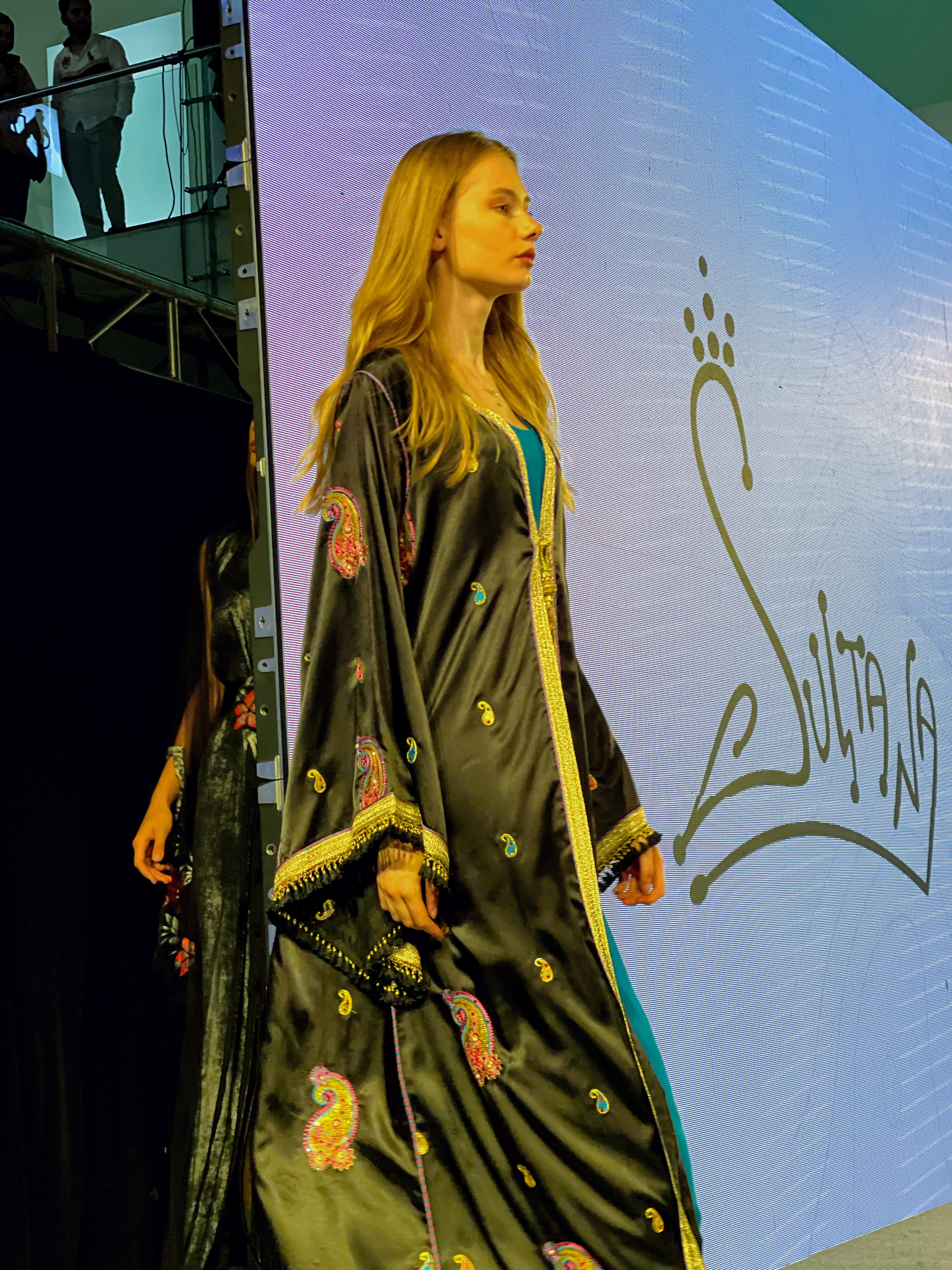
A model in abaya dress

== See also ==
- Islam and clothing
- Types of hijab
