= South Bromsgrove High School =

Location
- Charford Road; Bromsgrove, Worcestershire, B60 3NL; England
- Coordinates: 52.324718°N 2.061353°W

Information
- Type: Academy
- Department for Education URN: 140292 Tables
- Ofsted: Reports
- Headteacher: Chris Smith
- Gender: Mixed
- Age: 13 to 19
- Enrolment: 1,300; 311 in 6th form
- Website: http://www.southbromsgrove.worcs.sch.uk

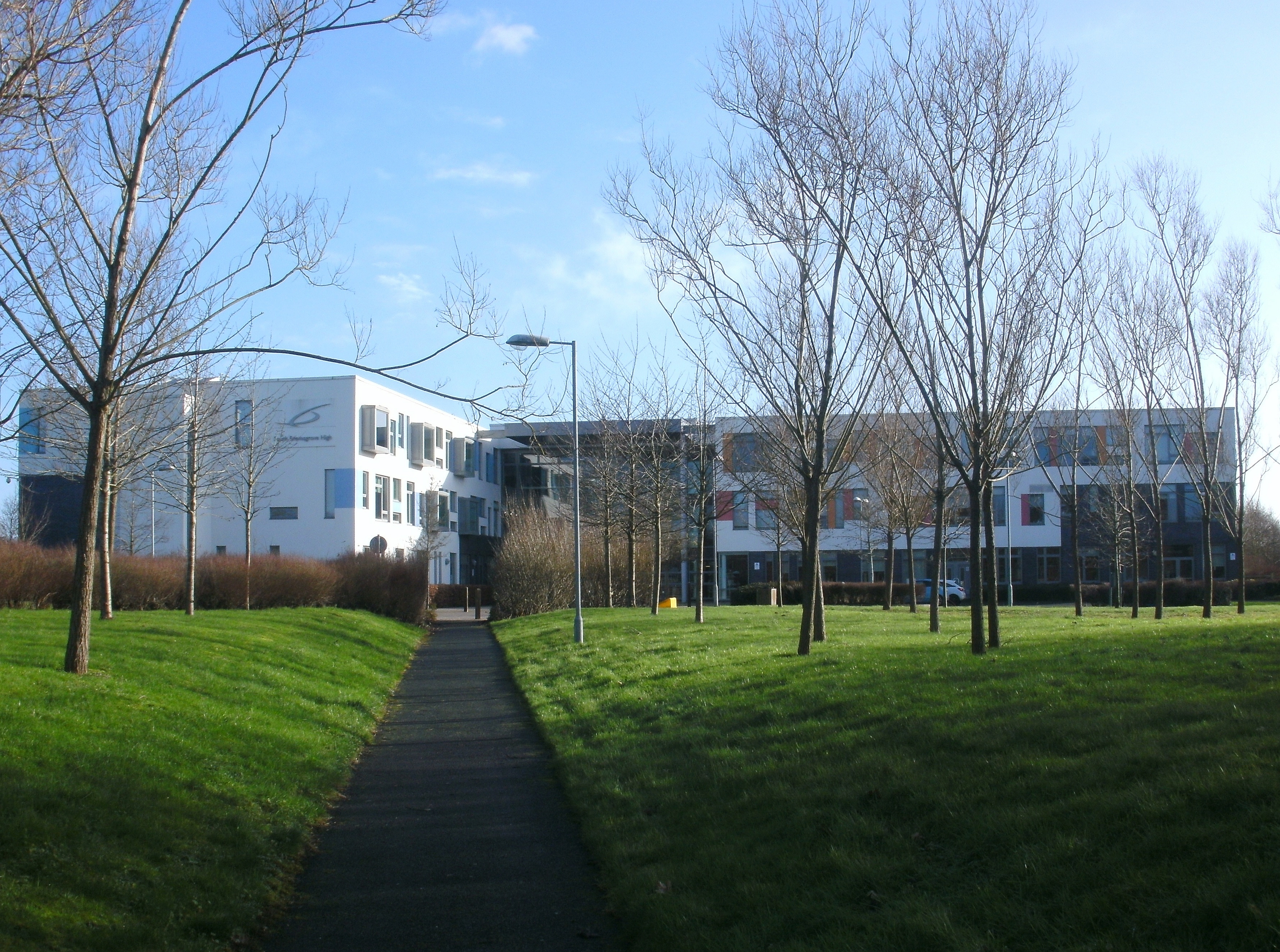
South Bromsgrove High School

South Bromsgrove High School (SBHS) is a co-educational, upper school and sixth form with academy status, located in Bromsgrove, Worcestershire, England. It is located opposite the housing estate of Charford. The school delivers to GCSE, and A level students from an area between Alvechurch and Malvern with around 1,350 students on roll.

== Facilities ==
A new set of buildings as part of a Private Finance Initiative was constructed to accommodate the increasing number of students and was officially opened by Prince Edward, Earl of Wessex. The new school building is located on the playing fields of the former school. The facilities include two sports halls, a rooftop terrace for use by sixth formers, and a separate 6th form cafeteria.

== House system ==
There are three houses, based on Bromsgrove's heritage:

- Plymouth (green)
- Vernon (blue)
- Talbot (red)

Each tutor group is placed into one of these houses and students remain in their assigned house for the duration of their time at the school. Competitions between the houses are held frequently throughout the year ranging from all aspects such as sports, academia and attendance.

== Eisteddfod ==
The school holds an annual Eisteddfod, taking place over two evenings. The PE evening comprises dance and sports competitions, and the Arts evening includes choirs, drama, and musical performances from each house. External judges are brought in from other schools to decide the winners of the arts awards.

The Basketball cup in the Eisteddfod competition is named the Josh Hanks Memorial Cup. This is in memory of a former student and basketball enthusiast who died in May 2009, during what would have been his final months of compulsory education at the school.

== Awards ==
SBHS holds the Successful Schools Project Award and the Investors in People Award as well as the Sports Mark Award, Basic Skills Quality Mark, Curriculum Award 2000, School Achievement Award 2000 & 2003, Arts Mark Gold (3 times), Charter Mark Award for Excellence, Careers Quality Mark in addition to three Leading Aspect Awards.

=== Duke of Edinburgh Award ===
SBHS is a regular participant in the Duke of Edinburgh Award and students in years ten, eleven and the sixth form take part in the scheme. In the 2007/2008 school year, 500 students took part in the scheme, with 55 former students achieving the Gold Award the previous year. Students begin at Bronze level in year ten and this is available to all students in that year group. The Silver Award is offered in year eleven, but only to those students who received their Bronze Award in year ten. The Gold Award is worked towards throughout both years twelve and thirteen and a "direct" Gold option is offered allowing students who have not taken part in the Bronze and Silver schemes previously to achieve a Gold Award.

== Ofsted inspections ==
A November 2007 Ofsted inspection, accorded the school a Grade 2 (Good). A 2012 report deemed the school outstanding

Following conversion to an academy in 2013, the school's Ofsted assessment deteriorated from its "Outstanding" rating to "Good" by 2023

== Catchment ==
The catchment area of the school includes pupils from Alvechurch Church of England Middle School, St. John's Church of England Middle School and Aston Fields Middle School.

== Notable former pupils ==
- Dan Bull, rapper
- Jordan Crane, rugby player, Leicester Tigers
- Craig Fagan, footballer
- Ben Francis, founder of sportswear brand Gymshark
- Poppy O'Toole, chef
- Jessica Varnish, cyclist
- Emily Kay, cyclist
- Katherine Priddy, musician
