= Tyler Saunders =

British wheelchair basketball player (born 1982/83)

Tyler Saunders is a British wheelchair basketball player, coach and personal trainer. He was born without a right leg.

Saunders was born 1982 or 1983. Living in Edgware, he had played able-bodied basketball in school, but then discovered a local wheelchair team. He started playing wheelchair basketball seriously around 2006. By 2010, he had been supported by the Lloyds TSB Local Heroes initiative, was part of the Team GB development squad, and hoped to play in the 2012 Summer Paralympics. Though he ultimately didn't qualify, he was one of the carriers of the Olympic torch during the 2012 Summer Olympics torch relay in Ealing. He had been picked as a torchbearer by Lloyds TSB, due to his work in basketball and coaching his club's junior teams.

Saunders then played for a German club, and after returning to Britain he became a physical trainer. He had expected to work with disabled people, but eventually found that his message of overcoming limitations appealed to a broader audience. He cooperated with a video production company owner and started to gain online attention. He had 25 000 followers on Instagram in early 2021, which had risen to over 100 000 in 2026.

He has competed on the gameshow Ninja Warrior UK, Hyrox and Spartan Race. As of 2023, he works with the athletic apparel retailer Gymshark.

Saunders is a member of the Seventh-day Adventist Church. As of 2023, he has two daughters.
