= Leana Deeb =

American content creator and app founder

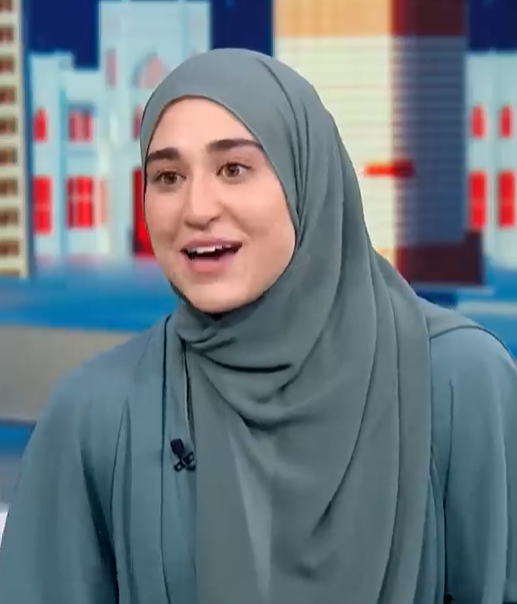
- Deeb in 2024
- Occupations: Content creator, app founder
- Awards: Forbes 30 Under 30 (2026), Time 100 Creators (2025)

Leana Deeb is an American content creator of Palestinian and Uruguayan heritage best known for her fitness and mental well-being focused content. She is also known for wearing a hijab in her fitness-focused content. She is the founder of mental health and fitness app Uplift You.

== Biography ==
Deeb, who is of Uruguayan and Palestinian heritage, is based in the United States. She first began rising to fame after starting to post videos in October 2022. In March 2023, however, she began wearing the hijab. That same year, she removed all of her old posts and replaced them with posts of her working out in modest attire, including the hijab.

In addition to her workouts, she has discussed her diet, emphasizing hydration and eating sufficiently to fuel her workouts, and has also emphasized her mental health and being a mental health advocate. She has discussed the business of being a creator, and claims to have between 15 to 18 employees helping her with her content creation. She has also discussed the logistics of working out as a hijabi Muslim, especially during Ramadan.

Deeb collaborated with Gymshark in 2025 to release a collection of modest gymwear, including tunics, hijabs, abayas, hoodies, and joggers. This also involved what Gymshark claimed to be the "World's First Modest Billboard", actually a massive mural made out of a mixture of paint and fabric. That same year, she headlined Dubai Active and spoke at the Oxford Union.

She has also created a fitness and workout app, Uplift You.

Deeb was included in the TikTok Discover List in 2026. She was also named to the Time 100 Creators in 2025 and to the Forbes 30 Under 30 in 2026.
