= St John's CE Middle Academy, Bromsgrove =

St John's CE Middle Academy
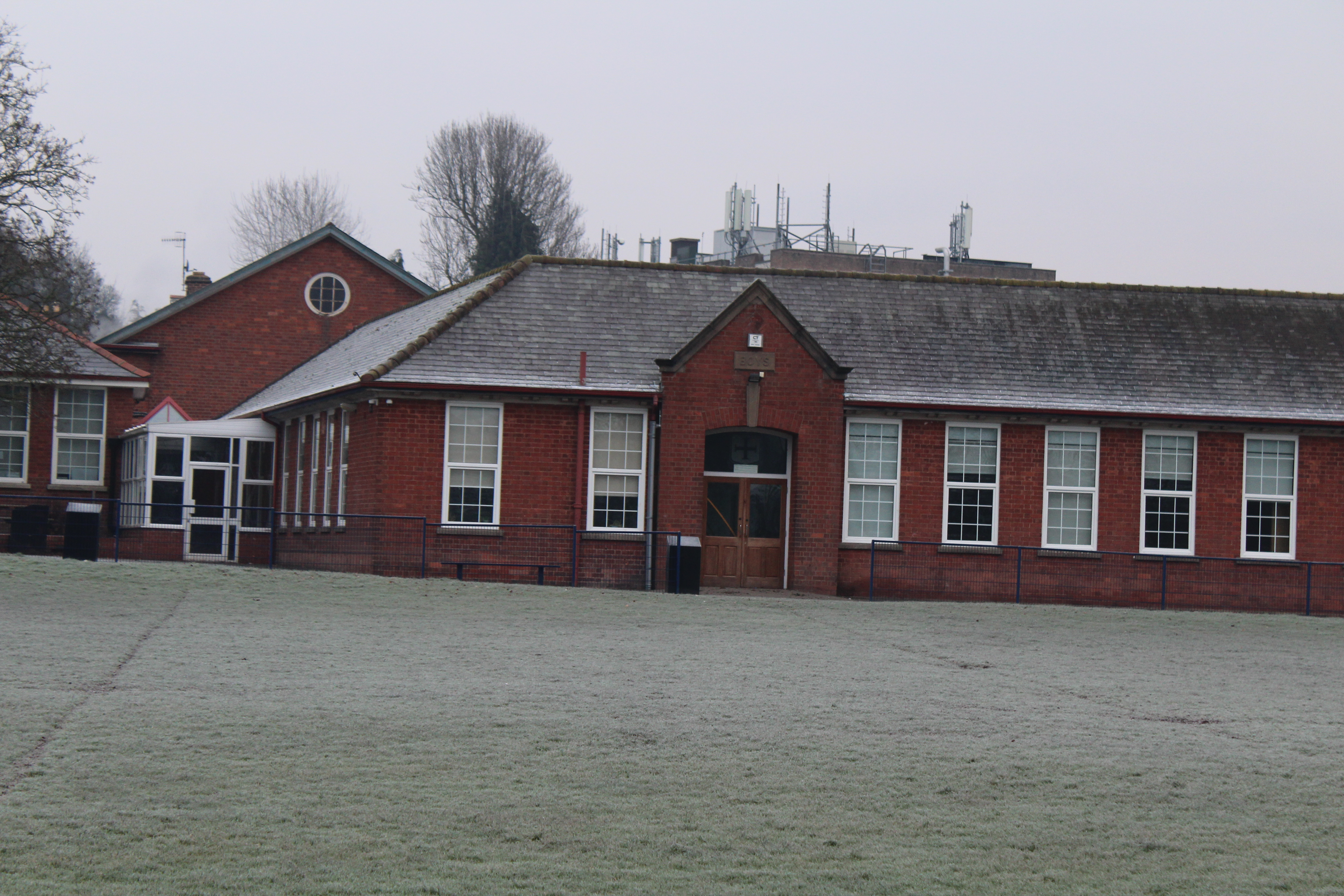

Location
- Watt Close; Bromsgrove, Worcestershire, B61 7DH; England
- Coordinates: 52.33253°N 2.06659°W

Information
- Type: Academy
- Motto: Give Of Your Best
- Religious affiliation: Church of England
- Established: February 1, 2013
- Local authority: Worcestershire
- Department for Education URN: 139286 Tables
- Ofsted: Reports
- Chair of Governors: Rosemary Shorter
- Headteacher: Geraint Roberts
- Assistant Headteacher: Alison Elwell-Thomas
- Gender: Mixed
- Age: 9 to 13
- Enrolment: 648
- Houses: Hanover, Stuart, Tudor and Windsor
- Colours: Yellow, Blue, Green and Red
- Website: http://www.St-Johns-Bromsgrove.worcs.sch.uk/

St John's CE Middle Academy -- formerly 'St John's CofE Foundation Middle School' -- is a middle school located in the town of Bromsgrove, Worcestershire. As of 2017, St John's have 648 students on roll, all aged between 9 and 13. In 2020 that figure was recorded as 640.

Pupils from St John's Middle School tend to feed into either South Bromsgrove High School or North Bromsgrove High School. In the latest Ofsted report in 2012, St John's was awarded 'Outstanding' status.
