= Ben Francis =

British businessman (born 1992)

Ben Francis MBE
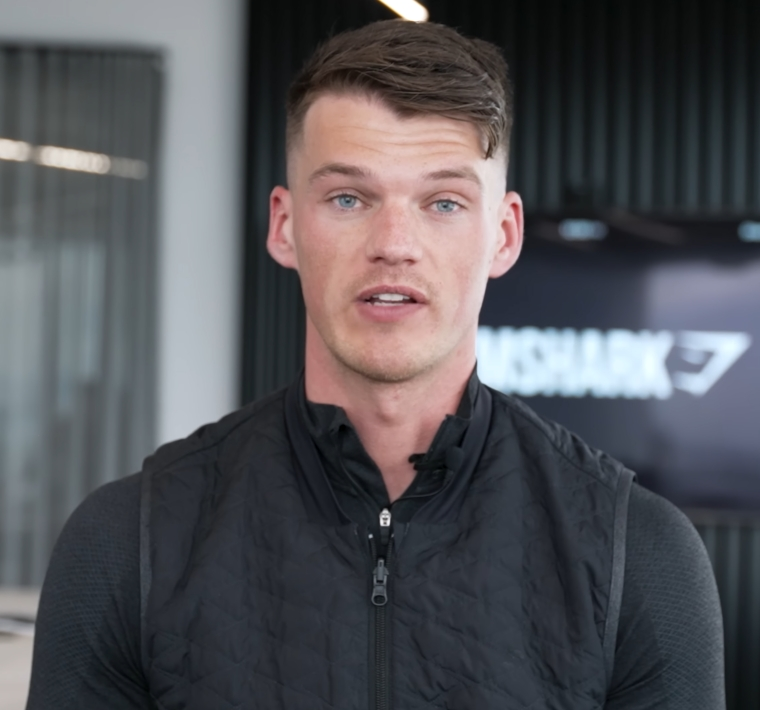
- Francis in 2022
- Born: Benjamin David Francis; 4 June 1992 (age 34); West Midlands, England
- Education: South Bromsgrove High School; Aston University
- Known for: Co-founder, CEO and majority owner of Gymshark
- Spouse: Robin Gallant (m. 2021)
- Children: 3
- Website: benfrancis.com

Benjamin David Francis MBE (born 4 June 1992) is a British billionaire businessman. He is the co-founder, CEO and majority owner of Gymshark, a fitness apparel and accessories company founded in 2012. He was appointed a Member of the Order of the British Empire (MBE) in the 2023 New Year Honours for services to the business sector.

With a stake of over 70% in Gymshark which is currently valued by investors at $1.45 billion, Francis had a net worth of $1.3 billion as of April 2023. In April 2023, he made his debut on Forbes' annual The World's Billionaires list.

== Early life ==
Benjamin David Francis was born in the West Midlands, England in 1992 and grew up in Bromsgrove, Worcestershire. He attended South Bromsgrove High School. He first became interested in computing after studying IT at school. His first business was an online company that sold car number plates. Francis started going to the gym as a teenager. He later said "the structure, consistency and work ethic I found in the gym I realised, could be applied to different areas of my life and it would work." In 2010, he enrolled at Aston University for international business and management wherein he had "a strong foundation on which to build a business." He dropped out in 2012.

== Career ==
Before launching Gymshark, Francis developed two fitness applications, Fat Loss Abs Guide and iPhysique. While at university between 2010 and 2013, he worked for Pizza Hut as a delivery boy earning £5 an hour. He left six months after launching Gymshark.

=== Gymshark ===
In 2012, at 19, he launched Gymshark in his parents' garage with school friend Lewis Morgan. The website initially sold fitness supplements. Unable to afford to buy stock or secure distribution deals with supplement suppliers, he began dropshipping supplies from other vendors and it took him six weeks to make his first sale. In 2013, branching out from supplements, Francis began designing and selling fitness apparel on Gymshark's website. He then manufactured products from his parents' garage in Bromsgrove using a sewing machine and a screen printer purchased with £1,000 of savings. He learned how to sew from his grandmother.

In 2013, he exhibited Gymshark's products at the BodyPower fitness trade show in Birmingham. After the trade show ended, a tracksuit went viral on Facebook, generating £30,000 in sales within 30 minutes. Francis later left university and quit his job at Pizza Hut to focus on the company full-time. As a start-up, Francis marketed the brand through partnering with social media influencers, including body builders Nikki Blackketter and Lex Griffin. Gymshark was one of the first brands to make extensive use of social media influencers.

In 2015, Francis stepped down as CEO of the company to become chief marketing officer, chief brand officer and chief product officer. At the time, he said the move would allow the company "to grow even more quickly" and give him time to "work on my weaknesses and become a more rounded businessperson". In 2018, Gymshark opened a new £5 million headquarters in Solihull, West Midlands. In 2019, Gymshark opened its own branded gym and innovation hub. Since 2016, Gymshark has been listed on The Sunday Times Fast Track of fast-growing private companies. The company currently sells products in 131 countries.

In August 2020, Gymshark sold a 21% stake to US private equity firm General Atlantic in a deal which valued the company in excess of £1 billion. Francis's 70% stake in the company is worth £700 million. In August 2021, he returned to the role of the company's CEO.

In 2018, Francis was included on the Forbes 30 Under 30 list. In 2019, Francis served on the UK Government's Business Council for Entrepreneurs. In 2020, Francis was awarded the EY UK Entrepreneur of the Year Award. Francis was appointed Member of the Order of the British Empire (MBE) in the 2023 New Year Honours for services to the business sector.

== Personal life ==
Francis is a car and motorcycle enthusiast, and a season ticket holder at Aston Villa. He and his girlfriend Robin Gallant became engaged in April 2021, and married on 9 September 2021. On 8 September 2022, Francis announced that they were expecting twins. Their twin sons were born on 24 December 2022. In July 2024, the couple announced that they were expecting another child.
