= Gymshark =

British fitness apparel company

Gymshark Ltd
- Industry: Fitness apparel; Accessories; Sports equipment
- Founded: 5 July 2012; 14 years ago
- Founders: Ben Francis; Lewis Morgan
- Headquarters: Solihull, West Midlands, England
- Key people: Ben Francis (Founder and CEO)
- Products: Sportswear; Athleisure
- Revenue: £646 million (2025)
- Owner: Ben Francis; General Atlantic (21%)
- Number of employees: 850 (2021)
- Website: gymshark.com

Gymshark Ltd is a British multinational athletic apparel retailer with head office in Solihull, England. Founded in June 2012 by Ben Francis and Lewis Morgan, the company was initially operating from a garage, using basic equipment such as a sewing machine and screen printer to produce garments. Since then, Gymshark has grown into a multinational retailer with a presence in over 230 countries through its online platforms.

As of 2025, Gymshark reports a global community of over 10 million customers and more than 18 million followers across social media platforms. The company operates 14 international online stores and employs over 900 staff across multiple regions, including its headquarters in Solihull, West Midlands, and an office in Denver, Colorado. Gymshark reached a valuation of over £1 billion in 2020. Gymshark sells online and it opened its first retail store on Regent Street, London.

== History ==
=== 2012–2016 ===
Gymshark was founded by school friends Ben Francis and Lewis Morgan in 2012. Both aged 20, they set up the brand while studying at university. Initially, Gymshark started drop shipping bodybuilding supplements through its website. In 2013, it began designing and manufacturing its own fitness apparel. Francis manufactured the garments in his parents' garage on a made-to-sell basis using a sewing machine and screen printer he purchased with £1,000 of savings. During the first year, Gymshark made £500 in sales per day.

In 2013, the company exhibited at the BodyPower fitness trade show at the NEC arena in Birmingham where it sold out of all its stock in the first day. After the show, Gymshark's Luxe tracksuit went viral on Facebook, generating £30,000 of sales within 30 minutes.

When the company's revenue reached £250,000, Francis and Morgan both left university to focus on Gymshark full time. In 2016, Morgan partially exited the business retaining 20% of the company, to focus on his other ventures, property development company Ernest Cole and fashion label Maniere De Voir.

=== 2019–present ===
In 2019, the company opened a new 8,000 square foot office in Hong Kong. In September that year, Gymshark launched the Gymshark Lifting Club, a gym and innovation hub, on the same site as its headquarters in Solihull.

In August 2020, US private equity firm General Atlantic purchased a 21% stake in the company for £275 million. The deal valued the company at £1.25 billion. The company said it would use the funding to further expand globally.

In March 2025, it was reported that Alix Earle was suing the company for £775,500 in losses following allegations it cancelled a sponsorship agreement. In April of the same year, Gymshark proposed a business restructure that would place almost a third of its workforce at risk of redundancy.

In July 2026 it was reported that Francis was in talks with General Atlantic about buying back some of the shares purchased in 2020.

== Locations ==
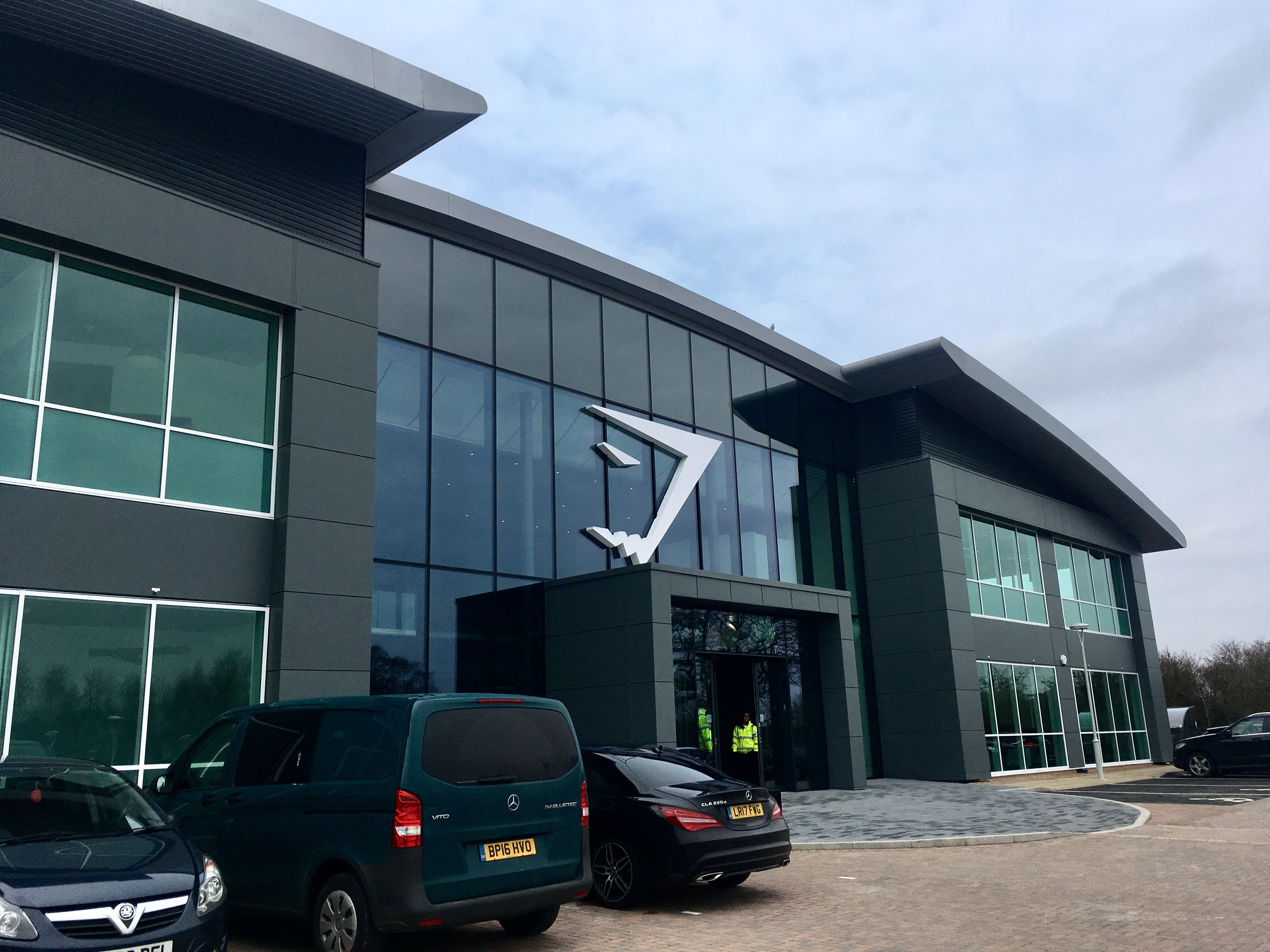
Gymshark headquarters in Blythe Valley Park

Gymshark's headquarters is at Blythe Valley Park in Solihull, West Midlands, Gymshark also has an office in London, and a North American office in Denver. Gymshark opened its first store on Regent Street in London on 29 October 2022.

This was followed by stores at Westfield Stratford City and White City. The first non-London store, at the Trafford Centre in Greater Manchester, opened in July 2025.

== Products and marketing ==
Gymshark sells fitness apparel for men and women including workout vests, hoodies, t-shirts and leggings. While the brand was initially aimed at men, by 2020 approximately two thirds of sales were to women. They released their first modest collection in collaboration with influencer Leana Deeb.

The company does not rely substantially on brick-and-mortar stores but did open its first pop-up shop in London's Covent Garden in February 2020. In 2022, Gymshark opened its first permanent store in Regent Street in London.

In August 2019, Gymshark released a fitness app offering both free and premium plans. The app provides a range of workouts, video demonstrations and customizable training plans. The home-based workouts gained popularity during the COVID-19 lockdowns.

=== Social media ===
Gymshark has utilized social media influencer marketing strategies by partnering with social media influencers. As of 2020, the company was paying 125 influencers to market the brand various on social media platforms, most notable being Francis Ngannou, Leana Deeb, Saffron Barker, GK Barry, and Tyler Saunders.

During the COVID-19 lockdown in 2020, Gymshark promoted its “66 Days | Change Your Life” challenge on TikTok using influencers from health, fitness, lifestyle, and dance. The campaign encouraged users to participate and share content using the hashtag #gymshark66, making consumer-created posts part of the campaign’s promotion.

=== Partnerships ===
Gymshark has partnered with SourStrips, Hyperice, Plunge, Turfgames, Ghost, Liquid Death, Barry's, Stanley, Alani Nu, Coffee Dose, Prime, Pressed, Beignet Box, and Go Greek.

== Public relations ==
In late 2023, American influencer Alix Earle alleged that Gymshark prematurely terminated a promotional partnership after she expressed pro-Israel views on social media. Earle claimed in filings to the High Court that Gymshark had agreed to pay her US$ 1 million for promotional content, including TikTok and Instagram posts, an event appearance, and a photo shoot. She argued that the agreement was ended early due to negative responses online to her stance. Gymshark denied that a binding contract existed.

Gymshark has also faced disputes with former brand ambassadors over restrictive contractual clauses. In 2023, British powerlifter Nathaniel Massiah, who had been an influencer for the company since age 17, began promoting a rival brand during a non-compete period. Massiah’s legal team contended the contract and proceedings were bought to a close.
