= List of schools in Worcestershire =

This is a list of schools in Worcestershire, England.

== State-funded schools ==
=== Primary and first schools ===
- Abberley Parochial Primary School, Abberley
- Abbey Park First School, Pershore
- Abbeywood First School, Redditch
- Arrow Valley First School, Redditch
- Ashton-under-Hill First School, Ashton under Hill
- Astley CE Primary School, Astley
- Astwood Bank Primary School, Astwood Bank
- Badsey First School, Badsey
- Batchley First School, Redditch
- Bayton CE Primary School, Bayton
- Beaconside Primary School, Rubery
- Belbroughton CE Primary School, Belbroughton
- Bengeworth CE Academy, Bengeworth
- Beoley First School, Beoley
- Bewdley Primary School, Bewdley
- Birchen Coppice Academy, Kidderminster
- Blackwell First School, Blackwell
- Blakedown CE Primary School, Blakedown
- Bredon Hancock's CE First School, Bredon
- Bretforton Village School, Bretforton
- Broadheath CE Primary School, Lower Broadheath
- Broadwas CE Primary School, Broadwas
- Broadway First School, Broadway
- Burlish Park Primary School, Stourport-on-Severn
- Callow End CE Primary School, Callow End
- Carnforth School, Worcester
- Castlemorton CE Primary School, Castlemorton
- Catshill First School, Catshill
- Chaddesley Corbett Endowed Primary School, Chaddesley Corbett
- Charford First School, Charford
- Chawson First School, Droitwich Spa
- Cherry Orchard Primary School, Worcester
- Church Lench CE First School, Church Lench
- Claines CE Primary School, Claines
- Cleeve Prior CE Primary School, Cleeve Prior
- Clent Parochial Primary School, Clent
- Clifton upon Teme Primary School, Clifton upon Teme
- Comberton Primary School, Kidderminster
- Cookley Sebright Primary School, Cookley
- Coppice Primary School, Hollywood
- Crabbs Cross Academy, Redditch
- Cranham Primary School, Warndon
- Cropthorne-with-Charlton CE First School, Cropthorne
- Crowle CE First School, Crowle
- Crown Meadow First School, Alvechurch
- Cutnall Green CE Primary School, Cutnall Green
- Defford-cum-Besford CE First School, Defford
- Dines Green Community Academy, Worcester
- Dodford First School, Dodford
- Eckington CE First School, Eckington
- Eldersfield Lawn CE Primary School, Eldersfield
- Elmley Castle CE First School, Elmley Castle
- Fairfield First School, Fairfield
- Far Forest Lea Memorial CE Primary School, Far Forest
- Feckenham CE Primary School, Feckenham
- Finstall First School, Bromsgrove
- Fladbury CE First School, Fladbury
- Flyford Flavell Primary School, Flyford Flavell
- Foley Park Primary Academy, Kidderminster
- Franche Primary School, Kidderminster
- Great Malvern Primary School, Malvern
- Great Witley CE Primary School, Great Witley
- Grimley and Holt CE Primary School, Grimley
- Grove Primary School, Malvern
- Hagley Primary School, Hagley
- Hallow CE Primary School, Hallow
- Hanbury CE First School, Hanbury
- Hanley Swan St Gabriel's with St Mary's CE Primary School, Hanley Swan
- Hartlebury CE Primary School, Hartlebury
- Harvington CE First School, Harvington
- Heronswood Primary School, Kidderminster
- Himbleton CE Primary School, Himbleton
- Hindlip First School, Fernhill Heath
- Hollymount School, Worcester
- Holy Redeemer RC Primary School, Pershore
- Holy Trinity School, Kidderminster
- Holyoakes Field First School, Redditch
- Hollywell Primary School, Rubery
- Honeybourne First School, Honeybourne
- Inkberrow Primary School, Inkberrow
- Kempsey Primary School, Kempsey
- Leigh and Bransford Primary School, Leigh Sinton
- Lickey End First School, Lickey End
- Lickey Hills Primary School, Lickey
- Lickhill Primary School, Stourport-on-Severn
- Lindridge St Lawrence's CE Primary School, Lindridge
- The Littletons CE Academy, South Littleton
- The Lyppard Grange Primary School, Worcester
- Madresfield CE Primary School, Madresfield
- Malvern Parish CE Primary School, Malvern
- Malvern Wells CE Primary School, Malvern Wells
- Malvern Wyche CE Primary School, Malvern
- Martley CE Primary School, Martley
- Matchborough First School Academy, Redditch
- Meadow Green Primary School, Wythall
- Meadows First School, Bromsgrove
- Millfields First School, Bromsgrove
- Moons Moat First School, Redditch
- North Worcester Primary School, Worcester
- Northleigh CE Primary School, Malvern
- Northwick Manor Primary School, Worcester
- Norton Juxta Kempsey CE Primary School, Norton
- Nunnery Wood Primary School, Worcester
- Oak Hill First School, Redditch
- Oasis Academy Warndon, Warndon
- Offenham CE First School, Offenham
- Offmore Primary School, Kidderminster
- Oldbury Park Primary RSA Academy, Worcester
- Ombersley Endowed First School, Ombersley
- Orchard Primary School, Pershore
- The Orchards School, Bromsgrove
- Our Lady of Mount Carmel RC First School, Redditch
- Our Lady Queen of Peace RC Primary School, Worcester
- Overbury CE First School, Overbury
- Pebworth First School, Pebworth
- Pendock CE Primary School, Pendock
- Perry Wood Primary School, Worcester
- Pinvin CE First School, Pinvin
- Pitmaston Primary School, Worcester
- Powick CE Primary School, Powick
- Red Hill CE Primary School, Worcester
- Romsley St Kenelm's CE Primary School, Romsley
- Rushwick CE Primary School, Rushwick
- St Ambrose Catholic Primary, Kidderminster
- St Andrew's CE First School, Barnt Green
- St Andrew's CE School, Evesham
- St Anne's CE Primary School, Bewdley
- St Barnabas CE First & Middle School, Drakes Broughton
- St Barnabas CE Primary School, Worcester
- St Bartholomew's CE Primary School, Stourport-on-Severn
- St Catherine's CE Primary School, Kidderminster
- St Clement's CE Primary, Worcester
- St George's CE First School, Redditch
- St George's CE Primary School, Worcester
- St George's CE School, Kidderminster
- St George's RC Primary School, Worcester
- St James' CE Primary School, Malvern
- St John's CE Primary School, Kidderminster
- St Joseph's RC Primary School, Droitwich Spa
- St Joseph's RC Primary School, Malvern
- St Joseph's RC Primary School, Warndon
- St Luke's CE First School, Redditch
- St Mary's CE Primary School, Kidderminster
- St Mary's RC Primary School, Broadway
- St Mary's RC Primary School, Evesham
- St Matthias CE Primary School, Malvern
- St Oswald's CE Primary School, Kidderminster
- St Peter's Droitwich CE Academy, Droitwich Spa
- St Peter's RC First School, Bromsgrove
- St Richard's CE First School, Evesham
- St Stephen's CE RSA Academy, Redditch
- St Thomas More RC First School, Redditch
- St Wulstan's RC Primary School, Stourport-on-Severn
- Sedgeberrow CE First School, Sedgeberrow
- Somers Park Primary School, Malvern
- Stanley Road Primary School, Worcester
- Stoke Prior First School, Stoke Prior
- Stourport Primary Academy, Stourport-on-Severn
- Suckley Primary School, Suckley
- Sutton Park Primary RSA Academy, Kidderminster
- Swan Lane First School, Evesham
- Sytchampton Endowed Primary School, Sytchampton
- Tardebigge CE First School, Tardebigge
- Tenacres First School, Redditch
- Tenbury CE Primary Academy, Tenbury Wells
- Tibberton CE First School, Worcester
- Tudor Grange Primary Academy Perdiswell, Worcester
- Upper Arley CE Primary School, Upper Arley
- Upton Snodsbury CE First School, Upton Snodsbury
- Upton-upon-Severn CE Primary School, Upton-upon-Severn
- The Vaynor First School, Redditch
- Webheath Academy Primary School, Redditch
- Welland Primary School, Welland
- Westlands First School, Droitwich Spa
- Whittington CE Primary School, Whittington
- Wilden All Saints CE Primary School, Stourport-on-Severn
- Wolverley Sebright Primary Academy, Wolverley
- Woodrow First School, Redditch
- Wychbold First School, Wychbold

=== Middle schools ===
- Abbey Park Middle School, Pershore
- Alvechurch CE Middle School, Alvechurch
- Aston Fields Middle School School, Bromsgrove
- Birchensale Middle School, Redditch
- Blackminster Middle School, South Littleton
- Bredon Hill Academy, Ashton under Hill
- Catshill Middle School, Catshill
- Church Hill Middle School, Redditch
- Ipsley CE RSA Academy, Redditch
- Parkside Middle School, Bromsgrove
- St Barnabas CE First & Middle School, Drakes Broughton
- St Bede's RC Middle School, Redditch
- St Egwin's CE Middle School, Evesham
- St John's CE Middle Academy, Bromsgrove
- St Nicholas' CE Middle School, Pinvin
- Walkwood CE Middle School, Redditch
- Westacre Middle School, Droitwich Spa
- Witton Middle School, Droitwich Spa
- Woodfield Academy, Redditch

=== Secondary and upper schools ===
- Baxter College, Kidderminster
- The Bewdley School, Bewdley
- Bishop Perowne Church of England College, Worcester
- Blessed Edward Oldcorne Catholic College, Worcester
- The Chantry School, Martley
- The Chase School, Malvern
- Christopher Whitehead Language College, Worcester
- The De Montfort School, Evesham
- Droitwich Spa High School, Droitwich Spa
- Dyson Perrins Church of England Academy, Malvern
- Hagley Roman Catholic High School, Hagley
- Hanley Castle High School, Hanley Castle
- Haybridge High School, Hagley
- Holy Trinity School, Kidderminster
- King Charles I School, Kidderminster
- North Bromsgrove High School, Bromsgrove
- Nunnery Wood High School, Worcester
- Pershore High School, Pershore
- Prince Henry's High School, Evesham
- Ridgeway Secondary School, Astwood Bank
- RSA Academy Arrow Vale, Redditch
- St Augustine's High School, Redditch
- South Bromsgrove High School, Bromsgrove
- The Stourport High School, Stourport-on-Severn
- Tenbury High Ormiston Academy, Tenbury Wells
- Trinity High School and Sixth Form Centre, Redditch
- Tudor Grange Academy, Redditch, Redditch
- Tudor Grange Academy, Worcester, Worcester
- Waseley Hills High School, Rubery
- Wolverley Church of England Secondary School, Wolverley
- Woodrush High School, Wythall

=== Special and alternative schools ===
- The Aspire Academy, Worcester
- The Beacon Primary Pupil Referral Unit, Redditch
- Chadsgrove School, Catshill
- Continu Plus Academy, Kidderminster
- The Forge Secondary Short Stay School, Redditch
- Fort Royal Community School, Worcester
- The Kingfisher School, Redditch
- Newbridge School, Worcester
- Perryfields Primary Pupil Referral Unit, Worcester
- Pitcheroak School, Redditch
- Regency High School, Warndon
- Rigby Hall School, Aston Fields
- Riversides School, Worcester
- Unity Academy, Kidderminster
- Vale of Evesham School, Evesham
- Wyre Forest School, Kidderminster

=== Further education ===
- Heart of Worcestershire College
- Kidderminster College
- South Worcestershire College
- Worcester Sixth Form College

== Independent schools ==
=== Primary and preparatory schools ===
- RGS The Grange, Claines
- RGS Springfield, Worcester

=== Senior and all-through schools ===
- Abbey College, Malvern
- Bowbrook House School, Peopleton
- Bredon School, Bushley
- Bromsgrove School, Bromsgrove
- Heathfield Knoll School, Wolverley
- The King's School, Worcester
- Madinatul Uloom Al Islamiya School, Kidderminster
- Malvern College, Malvern
- Malvern St James, Malvern
- RGS Dodderhill, Droitwich Spa
- River School, Worcester
- Royal Grammar School Worcester, Worcester

=== Special and alternative schools ===
- Abigail's Place, Spetchley
- Bankside School, Hanley Castle
- Bridge School Malvern, Hanley Swan
- Cambian New Elizabethan School, Hartlebury
- Compass Community School Vicarage Park, Stottesdon
- Cotswold Spa Hospital School, Broadway
- Gloverspiece School, Ladywood
- Lokrum Fields, Stoke Pound
- New College Worcester, Worcester
- Norton College, Norton
- Nurture Learning, Kidderminster
- Our Place School, Bransford
- Salford Farm Outdoor Learning Centre, Clifton upon Teme
- Sunfield Children's Home, Clent
- Wribbenhall School, Bewdley
