= Haybridge High School =

Haybridge High School and Sixth Form

Location
- Brake Lane; Hagley; Stourbridge, West Midlands, DY8 2XS; United Kingdom; 52°25′26″N 2°08′56″W

Information
- Type: Academy
- Established: 1976
- Founder: Hilary Hansell
- Local authority: Worcestershire
- Specialist: Technology, Applied Learning and Sport
- Department for Education URN: 136898 Tables
- Ofsted: Reports
- Chair: Jason Scott
- Headteacher: C Mondon-Lines
- Gender: Mixed
- Age: 11 to 18
- Enrolment: 1276
- Colour
- Website: http://www.haybridge.worcs.sch.uk/

Haybridge High School and Sixth Form is an 11–18 mixed academy school with approximately 1,250 students (420 in the sixth form) in Hagley, Stourbridge, England, United Kingdom, serving North West Worcestershire, the Metropolitan Borough of Dudley, and South Staffordshire. The school is a Technology College, with the two additional specialisms of Applied Learning and Sports. It is also a Training School and a Leading Edge School.

== History ==
The school was built on a greenfield site and opened in 1976 with approximately 10 students. At the beginning of the 2004–2005 school term Haybridge (at the time a 13–18 high school) merged with Hagley Middle School (a 9–13 middle school) and became an 11–18 secondary school, as part of the move across the local region from a three- to two-tier system. Hagley Middle School was served by a number of smaller first schools; these first schools have now been made primary schools to serve Haybridge. Initially the one high school was still located on two sites, until September 2007 when both halves of Haybridge moved to the one campus on Brake Lane. To accommodate the extra students an expansion of the existing buildings was undertaken.

== Present day ==
An Ofsted report of December 2008 awarded the school a Grade 1 (outstanding in all aspects), stating that the school is nationally among the top 10%. The school has consistently been one of the highest performing state schools in Worcestershire at GCSE age (2004 data).

Haybridge Academy is part of a Worcestershire organisation called ContinU, a trust that creates more courses for students attending secondary and high schools in the Wyre Forest and Hagley area. Haybridge is currently working with:

- Baxter College, Business and Enterprise
- The Bewdley School
- Hagley RC High School
- King Charles I School
- Stourminster and Blakebrook Special Needs Schools
- Stourport High School
- Wolverley CE Secondary School

In August, Haybridge High School achieved 85% of students gaining 5+ A* to C GCSE grades including Maths and English. In 2010, the government introduced the English Baccalaureate. Haybridge High School achieved 22% of students gaining the English baccalaureate. Adding to these great successes Haybridge High School in 2014 received a visit from Sir Ian McKellen, as well as 5 consistent years of 70% of all pupils receiving at least one 7, 8 or 9.

== Awards ==
- Healthy Schools.
- The ICT Mark.
- Eco School.
- NACE award for work with gifted and talented students.
- The school is a specialist school with technology status, and vocational and sport as second specialisms. Foundation status was achieved in 2007. The school is a Training School and in the Leading Edge Partnership.

== Notable staff and pupils ==
- Adrian Chiles, British television and radio presenter
- Mark Yates, English footballer and manager
- Russell Penn, English footballer
- Jacqui Smith (Home Secretary 2007–2009, Labour MP for Redditch, 1997–2010) was Head of Economics 1990–1997
