= Cors Forest =

Forest in England

Cors forest was an ancient forest in Worcestershire and Gloucester, to the south of Malvern Chase. It appears to have included all that part of Gloucestershire lying between the rivers Severn and Leadon. The chase extended into Worcestershire on the boundary of Eldersfield and Chaceley.

== History ==
According to Bell, "the manor and forests of Malvern and Cors, and the castle Hanley, were granted in the reign of Edward I to Gilbert de Clare, the red knight, earl of Gloucester, on his marriage with Joan d'Acres, the king's daughter (in 1290). The forests having become the property of a subject, Malvern was entitled a chase, and Cors a lawn, by which name it now goes."

According to Chambers, "we find in Dougdale's baronage, that, upon Gilbert the second's marriage with Maude (in 1308), daughter of John de Burgh, (actually Richard de Burgh, not his son John) among other lands, was assigned to her, for her dowry, the chace of Cors, the castle and manor of Hanlegh, and the chace of Malverne; but she having no children by him, his sisters became his heirs; and Elianore, the eldest, who married Hugh le Despencer, the younger, brought Malverne, with other large possessions, into that family: and from them, after the third generation, it came, by an heir general, to Richard Beauchamp, Earl of Warwick, in the time of Henry V."

By the 1490s the chase had come to be called Corse Lawn, suggesting that the glades and clearings that broke the woodland were as extensive at least as the woodland.

Corse Chase, which with Tewkesbury manor was granted by the Crown in 1547 to Thomas Seymour, Lord Seymour of Sudeley, and was afterwards forfeited, was in 1629 granted by the Crown in trust for Lionel Cranfield, Earl of Middlesex.

By 1779 all the trees had been cleared, and Corse Lawn was a wide and level open common. At this date, the parishioners pastured sheep upon it, but they were often ruined because in a wet season hardly any sheep survived the rot. The Lawn itself was inclosed, under Acts of Parliament, in 1796 and 1797.

== See also ==
- The village of Corse, Gloucestershire
