= Hanley Castle High School =

Location
- Church End; Hanley Castle; Worcestershire, WR8 0BL; England; 52.0762°N 2.2356°W

Information
- Type: Academy
- Motto: DUCET AMOR PATRIÆ
- Religious affiliation: Non-denominational Christian (collective worship)
- Established: 1326; 700 years ago
- Founders: Lechmere baronets
- Local authority: Worcestershire
- Specialist: Languages
- Department for Education URN: 137101 Tables
- Ofsted: Reports
- Chairman of Governors: Kate Taylor
- Head teacher: Mark Stow
- Gender: Mixed
- Age: 11 to 18
- Enrolment: 1103
- Houses: Gilbert College; Burley College; Horton College
- Colours: Red and Black
- Partnership Governors: Prof Tony Beech (University of Birmingham), Barbara Hinton (Upton upon Severn Educational Foundation), Beulah Pope, (Old Hancastrian)
- Alumni: Old Hancastrians
- Website: http://www.hanleycastle.worcs.sch.uk

Hanley Castle High School is a non-selective mixed secondary school and sixth form centre located in the village of Hanley Castle, 1.4 miles (2.2 km) from the small town of Upton-upon-Severn, Worcestershire. It was formerly known as Hanley Castle Grammar School, and was probably founded in 1326, making it one of the oldest schools in England.

For much of the 20th century, it was a selective boys grammar school that grew from about 50 to around 200 day-pupils and boarders. In 1972, the school opened its doors to girls. In 1974, it became a mixed gender, voluntary controlled comprehensive school and it started to intake pupils at age 14 on transfer from the Hill School in nearby Upton-upon-Severn. The school reverted to being an 11–18 school in the 1990s and the population of students grew over time to around 1022 on roll in 2017. In 2011, the school became an academy.

The campus comprises 17th century Grade II listed buildings that are still in use alongside those of the major expansions of the late 20th, and early 21st century. The school serves a large, mainly rural area roughly bounded by Malvern to the west, Worcester to the north, and the county of Gloucestershire to the south.

== History ==
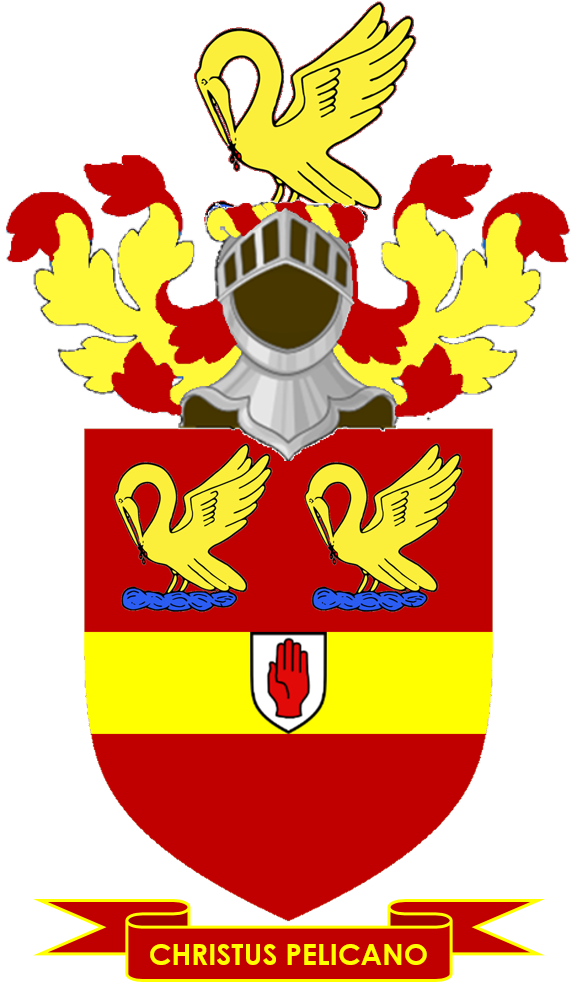
armorial achievement of the Lechmere baronets

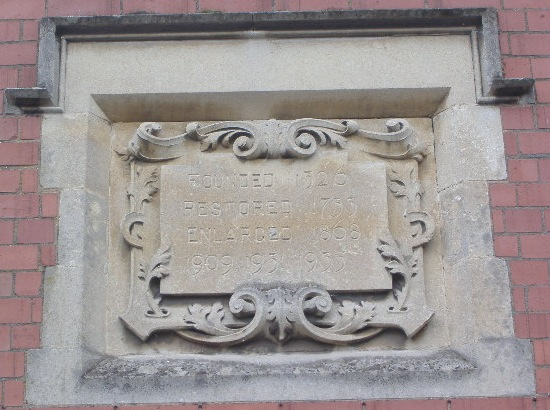
Engraved sandstone plaque. The text reads: Founded 1326 Restored 1735 Enlarged 1868 1909 1930 1935

In 1326, a chantry school was established to teach local children music, reading and writing, so that they could become part of the choir of St Mary's church. Deeds dating from 1523 and 1544 are the earliest extant documents, and the Church of England episcopal archives record a Philippus Frye as being a master at the school in 1582. In 1633, new trustees were installed, and, in 1733, the school house was rebuilt on funds donated by Sir Nicholas and Mr Edmund Lechmere. For several centuries, the school functioned under the patronage of the baronets and hereditary peers of the Lechmere family who have been settled in Hanley Castle, Worcestershire, since the 11th century. The baronets were traditionally chairmen or members of the board of governors until at least the mid-1970s. The school's emblem is the pelican that features on the Lechmere family coat of arms. In 1868, in order to improve the teaching standards, a new headmaster was installed by the trustees, the school was rebuilt in 1869 and divided into an endowed grammar school for the sons of the middle classes and an elementary school providing the labouring and agricultural classes with a basic education. Following further changes in 1893, the primary school was named St Mary's Primary School and was relocated in the nearby hamlet of Cross Hands and the grammar school provided education for boys from the age of 8 to 17.

In 1909, funds were allocated by Worcestershire County Council for the construction of new classrooms and the appointment of governors was supervised by the council. The number of students increased from 55 in 1921, to 172 in 1946 with 4 boys in the sixth form. By the late 1950s, a first modern extension including new classrooms, a science laboratory, and modern sanitary facilities had been constructed, and the number of pupils had increased to 217 boys aged 11 to 18 who were generally admitted by selection after passing the 11-plus exam. About 50 of the pupils were boarders, and although government owned, the school was still run very much on the traditional lines of a typical English "Public School" of which there were many in the Malvern area. With 42 students in the sixth form in 1962, an urgent request for further extensions to the school became a subject of debate in the House of Commons of the United Kingdom.

Compared with other schools in the county, Hanley Castle was still small, and, in 1969, following changes in government education policy, the school was developed more on the lines of a comprehensive school to introduce a focus on vocational as well as academic education. The boarding section was closed down, the dormitories, resident staff quarters, and the clinic were converted to classrooms and teachers' offices, and girls were admitted for the first time in 1972. In 1974, the school became a comprehensive school and was renamed Hanley Castle High School. At this stage, although there were still pupils under the age of 14, the new intake of pupils came each year by transfer of pupils from "The Hill School" (now closed) at Tunnel Hill, Upton-upon-Severn. Prior to that The Hill had been a state secondary school for children aged 11–18. The Hill was renamed "The Hill Junior High School" in 1974 as part of the same round of changes. In 1991, Hanley Castle High School returned to being an age 11–18 High School following the two-tier school system, and the Hill Junior High School was closed. By 2002, the student population at Hanley Castle High School had increased to around 850, and to around 1,000 by 2006. On 23 September 2011, the school was granted academy status.

== Architecture ==
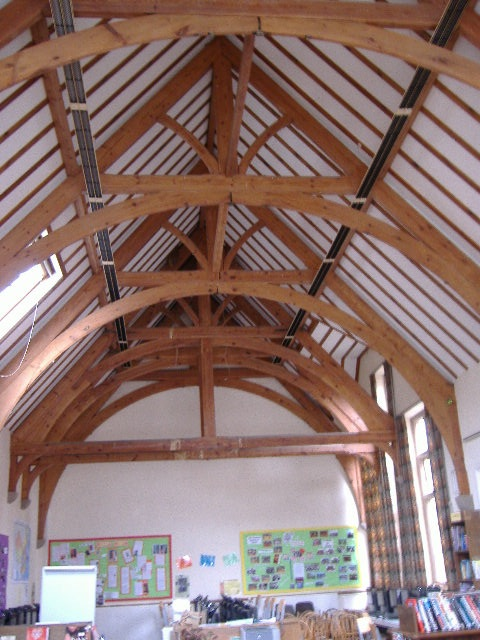
Inside the traditional schoolouse building, now part of the main library. Early 20th century.

The school has existed for almost 700 years, and has retained many of its original features. The oldest parts are listed buildings dating from around 1600, include the Grade II western wing, formerly a dormitory and since the 21st century largely converted to use for administration and teachers' facilities,. The core buildings throughout much if the 20th century were traditional Victorian school architecture now serving for administration, and the former 17th century headmaster's house which from around 1970, served as the sixth form centre until the construction of the purpose-built unit in 2016. One addition, the first for over 50 years, was made to the campus in the form of a late 1950s style block with four classrooms and limited modern sanitary facilities. Following the school becoming coeducational and its growth following the closure of the secondary school in Upton-on-Severn, in the late 20th and the early 21st centuries, many more buildings have been added that are carefully designed to harmonise with the historic architecture without disturbing the original character. They include science laboratories, a gym, a sports hall, and a performance hall, as well as new classrooms which were built over a filled in defunct swimming pool.

== Facilities ==
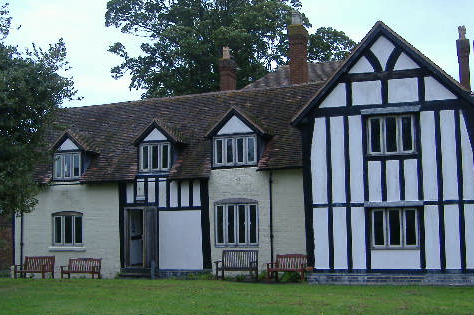
Former headmaster's residence and Sixth Form Centre. A 17th-century listed building.

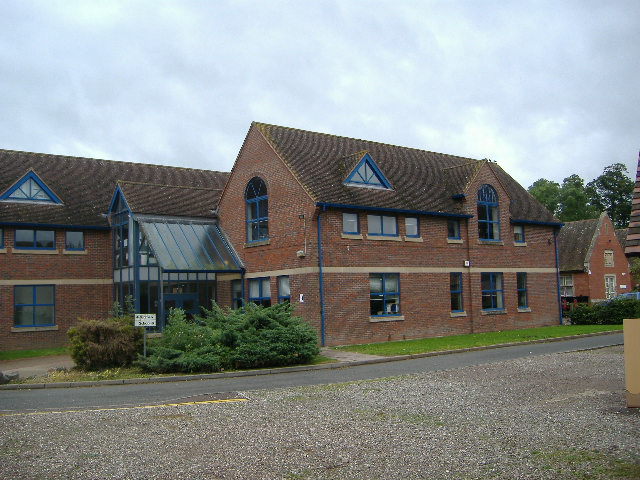
A 20th-century building, the maths department

With the changes in 1969, many of the old traditions were lost in the course of modernisation along with the demolition of older buildings that have been replaced by extensive expansion. The school nevertheless retains its centuries-old stance as the focal point of the tiny village, and its high standards of academic achievement. The campus now comprises many new buildings that include six science laboratories, two computer rooms, two music rooms, a drama studio, two art studios and five craft, design and technology work areas. Funded by Worcestershire County Council and Malvern Hills District Council, a £650,000 sports hall accommodating four badminton courts was added in 2002. A £2 million, purpose-built 2-storey language centre was added to the campus in 2008, and is fully equipped with language learning technology including overhead LCD projectors, interactive whiteboards, and laptop computers to convert any of the classrooms into language laboratories. A new music block has also been added.

=== Sixth Form Centre ===
The school now also has a self-contained sixth-form college on site, with around 200 students studying for their A levels. Due to pressures resulting from a 50% increase in the number of sixth form students, a £1.4 million fund was agreed by the Department for Education for a new centre which opened in September 2016. The project was designed by architect Jack Richardson and students to be in harmony with the many other modern buildings on the campus, and includes solar energy panels. The new purpose-built facility designed includes classrooms, an IT suite, a common room, a library and separate study rooms. It relieves the 1600s Grade II listed building, formerly the headmaster's residence until the 1970s, when it entered use as a Sixth Form Centre and still continues in use as part of the campus complex. The Sixth Form Centre publishes a comprehensive stand-alone prospectus.

== Catchment ==
Hanley Castle High School is located in the middle of a rural area surrounded by farms, small villages and hamlets, and is bounded to the east by the River Severn. The nearest urban centres are the small town of Upton-upon-Severn at 1.4 miles (2.2 km) and Malvern at about 6 miles (9.5 km). The main feeder schools include Castlemorton C.E. Primary School, Eldersfield Corse Lawn C.E. Primary School, Hanley Swan (St. Gabriel's) Primary School, Kempsey Primary School, Longdon St. Mary's C.E. Primary School, Pendock C.E. Primary School, Upton-upon-Severn C.E. Primary School, and Welland Primary School, and schools in the Malvern area. Admissions are accepted according to priorities of pupils' needs and location within and outside the general catchment area.

== Curriculum ==
Core subjects taught in the school follow the National Curriculum. The Sixth Form offers courses at AS/A2 / BTEC Levels and include:, Art & Design, Biology, Business StudiesCh, Chemistry, Dance, Design & Technology, Economics, English Language, English Literature, Fashion BTEC, Film Studies, Food, Nutrition and Health, French, German, Further Maths, Geography, Government & Politics, History, Home Economics, Information Technology, Maths, Modern Foreign Languages, Music, Music Technology, Philosophy, Product Design, Psychology, Sociology, Sport & Physical Education, and Theatre Studies.

As a designated Language College, the school offers French and German to GCSE and A-level. A fast-track programme for advanced linguists enabling them to take their first modern language GCSE in Year 9 and then continue with AS level or a new language in Years 10 and 11. Some pupils can choose to take a GCSE in all three languages. Extra curricular clubs also provide experience in Italian, Swedish, and Chinese Mandarin.

== Academy ==
In 2011, following a successful application, the school was converted to Academy, a new status introduced by the Department of Education (DoE) in 2010, for schools assessed as well performing. This meant more autonomy of management and direct government funding. Under the government scheme, the school becomes effectively independent and part of an education market, although still a public asset. The school could now directly hire staff and set their own rates of pay, design its own structure of curricula, and to set its own annual school year calendar. Through the DoE Young People's Learning Agency the school may also receive additional grants that would not be available from the local education authority (LEA).

== Academic achievement ==
Ofsted judges Hanley Castle to be a good school with outstanding features, among them: the quality of teaching and learning, support for vulnerable learners, well behaved pupils, a peer system of reporting incidents to senior pupils in confidence, good leadership and management, and a range of extra-curricular activities and clubs. In her report, inspector Rashida Sharif describes Hanley Castle as a "vibrant and dynamic school that has not stood still since its last inspection, held in March 2006." The school's academic performance in GCSE results was ranked in 2004 among the top 200 state schools in the country, and throughout the years 2005–2008 was consistently and significantly higher than both the county and national averages, while The Guardian league table also places it as one of the top performing schools in the county for 2007–08. In 2012, 98% of students passed their A-level exams with 10% reaching grade A and 67% at grade C.

Out of 3,500 secondary schools in England, the Ministry of Education announced in 2016 that Hanley Castle was among the 100 top performing schools in the country for the period from 2013 to 2015. In 2019, the school was ranked 4th in Worcestershire with a performance well above the national average.

=== Awards ===
The school has several achievement awards, including the International School and Healthy School awards, its specialist status in languages in 2006, and its financial management standard in schools in 2007/08 In May 2003, the school was one of only 274 schools in the country to receive the Artsmark Gold Award from the Arts Council England, and won again in 2014.

The school is part of the Leading Aspect Award with the Hanley Castle Pyramid scheme that combines the school with eight of its major feeder primary schools within the framework of effective implementation of the government's Modern Languages Entitlement at Key Stage 2 through Primary and Secondary Partnership. The school also has International School and Healthy School awards.

== Sport and culture ==
For over a hundred years, the school has maintained a tradition of sports, and by 1890 Hanley Castle Grammar School was fielding a cricket team. Students represent the school in a number of sports including hockey, netball, rugby, football, volleyball, tennis, cricket, badminton, athletics, cross-country and swimming, and the facilities include a sports hall and a fully-equipped gymnasium, outdoor tennis courts, and two large fields for cricket, rugby, track, and athletics. The school hosts an annual sporting event known as the "Hanley Run" in which around 900 runners compete in a cross country running race. While the run is compulsory for junior students, everyone from year 10 and above, (including staff) may participate. Netball, hockey, basketball, table tennis, indoor football, badminton, and girls football are offered as organised extra-curricular activities.

In 2017, three pupils qualified for the final of the annual British Schools Karting Championship.

== Colleges ==
As a traditional boys grammar school, students were allocated to three houses, Hall, Lane, and Rhydd for the purpose of inter-house sports events. The modern school has a system of three 'colleges': Gilbert College (green) named after Gilbert de Hanley, a local 12th century forester; Burley College (blue), that takes its name from the Anglo-Saxon word burh leah and referring to the land on which stood the 13th century Hanley Castle built by King John; and Horton College (yellow) from the former Anglo-Saxon name horh tun for Roberts End, a nearby ancient pottery settlement.

== In popular culture ==
Novelist P.G. Wodehouse whose aunt, Lucy Apollonia Wodehouse, was the wife of the vicar of Hanley Castle based several stories in the area. Severn End, the stately home of the Lechmere Baronets, is said to be the inspiration for Brinkley Court, the country seat for Bertie Wooster's Aunt Dahlia. In addition, Hanley Castle Grammar School, 50 metres from St Mary's Church, was the model for Market Snodsbury Grammar School, in Right Ho Jeeves (1934). with at least one of the stories mentioning the School Hall, now the school library, in detail.

== Alumni ==
There is an Old Hancastrians Association.

=== Hanley Castle High School ===
Among the alumni from the shorter history of the comprehensive school are David Gayler, a politician who contested for the Liberal Democrat Cotswold seat in 1997 and has been a Member of Gloucestershire County Council since 1993, Paul Titchener who was Mayor of Brackley, Northamptonshire in 2001 and again in 2005, and author David Mitchell whose novels have been awarded many major literary prizes and twice shortlisted for the Man Booker Prize. His novel Cloud Atlas has been made into a $100 million Hollywood film (2012).

=== Hanley Castle Grammar School ===
One of the earliest recorded notable students was Walter Battison Haynes (1859–1900) who was awarded the Mozart Scholarship at the Leipzig Conservatorium and on leaving the Conservatorium received the highest certificate given to a pupil; professor of harmony and composition at the Royal Academy of Music; organist and choirmaster, Chapel Royal, Savoy. Admiral Sir William George Tennant, Royal Navy officer and former Lord Lieutenant of Worcestershire was a pupil at the school before joining the Royal Navy in 1905 at the age of 15. In 1940 he was in command of the evacuation of Allied soldiers from the beaches of Dunkirk during Operation Dynamo. Professor Nigel Coates, architect, and since 1995 Professor of Architectural Design at the Royal College of Art was educated at the school from 1961 to 1967. P. H. Newby CBE (1918 – 1997) who attended the school from 1931 to 1936, was winner of the first Booker Prize, and Managing Director BBC Radio from 1975 to 1978. Peter Pumfrey, (1928-2015), Class of 1946, was emeritus Professor and former Dean of the Faculty of Education at Manchester University, a Fellow of the British Psychological Society, and a Chartered Psychologist. Robert Welch MBE, designer and silversmith whose style helped define British modernism, also briefly played cricket for Worcestershire County Cricket Club while at school. Jazz trombonist Chris Barber was educated at the grammar school during World War II before returning to London at the age of 15. His version of Sidney Bechet's "Petite Fleur" spent twenty-four weeks in the UK Singles Charts, making it to No. 3 and selling over one million copies, and was awarded a gold disc.

== See also ==
- List of the oldest schools in the United Kingdom
- List of schools in Worcestershire

Other Malvern area secondary schools

- Dyson Perrins Church of England Academy
- The Chase School
