= Corse, Gloucestershire =

Village in Gloucestershire, England

Coordinates: 51.9359°N 2.3087°W

Corse
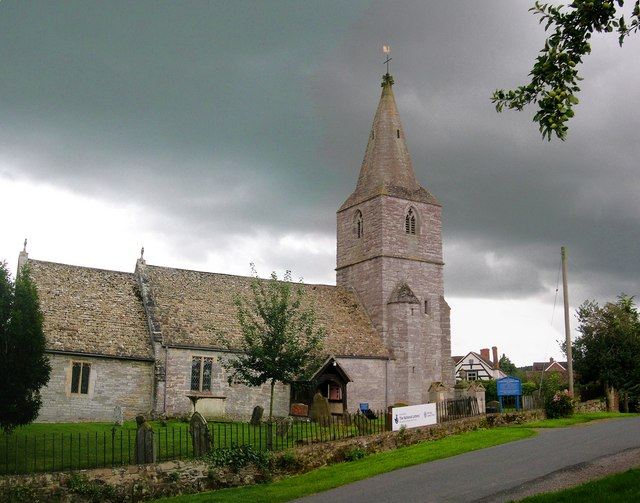
- St Margaret's Church, Corse

- Location within Gloucestershire
- Population: 578 (2011)
- OS grid reference: SO788264
- Civil parish: Corse
- District: Forest of Dean
- Shire county: Gloucestershire
- Region: South West
- Country: England
- Sovereign state: United Kingdom
- Post town: GLOUCESTER
- Postcode district: GL19
- Police: Gloucestershire
- Fire: Gloucestershire
- Ambulance: South Western
- UK Parliament: Forest of Dean

Corse is a village in the English county of Gloucestershire, next to the village of Staunton. The parish lies on the tongue of land between the River Severn and the River Leadon. It is 6 miles north of Gloucester and 7 miles south-west of Tewkesbury.

St Margaret's Church is mainly 14th century. Corse Court is mediaeval. The settlement of Snig's End, in the north of the parish was the site of a settlement for industrial workers under the auspices of the National Land Company in 1847.

== History ==
The parish was within Corse Chase. The land was originally heavily wooded, but by the 1490s the chase had come to be called Corse Lawn, suggesting that the glades and clearings that broke the woodland were as extensive at least as the woodland. By 1779 all the trees had been cleared, and Corse Lawn was a wide and level open common. At this date, the parishioners pastured sheep upon it, but they were often ruined because in a wet season hardly any sheep survived the rot. The Lawn itself was inclosed, under acts of Parliament in 1796 and 1797.

The parish had no nucleated village centre other than the church and farm-houses near the southern boundary of the parish. By the late 18th century the other houses in the parish were strung out along the western and northern edges of the Lawn.

In 1847 the Snig's End estate in the northeast of the parish was acquired by the National Land Company, which established a Chartist settlement. It was the third of the Chartist estates. By 1848 a school-house and 85 cottages had been built. The single-storey brick cottages, of the same design as on other Chartist estates, have four rooms and a front with a central pediment or low gable. The settlement was not a success, and the tenants resisted paying their rent; the National Land Company was dissolved under the National Land Company Dissolving Act 1851 (14 & 15 Vict. c. cxxxix). The building planned to include the school, and also, apparently, offices and communal rooms, is a one-storey brick building in the same style as the cottages; by 1870 it had become the Prince of Wales public house.

== Corse Chase ==
Corse Chase, which was closely connected with Malvern Chase, belonged to the Earls of Gloucester in the 12th century and was presumably part of the great manor of Tewkesbury, with which it descended until the 16th century. Corse Chase extended far beyond the parish of Corse. It appears to have included all that part of Gloucestershire lying between the rivers Severn and Leadon. As late as 1628 there were still deer in the chase in considerable numbers, and in 1631 and 1638 efforts were made to prevent poaching and preserve the cover.

== St Margaret's Church ==
The church lies next to the moated manor-house called Corse Court. Most of the fabric of the church derives from the late 14th century. The font is 12th century.

== Corse Court ==
Corse Court is a Grade II* listed former manor house, and dates back to the 14th century with several more modern extensions. Originally held by the Dean and Chapter of Westminster Abbey, it was later the seat of the Throckmorton family. Sir Baynham Throckmorton sold it in 1632 to Thomas Coventry, 1st Earl of Coventry.
