= Our Lady and St Alphonsus Church =

Coordinates: 52.0908°N 2.2753°W

- Our Blessed Lady and St Alphonsus Church
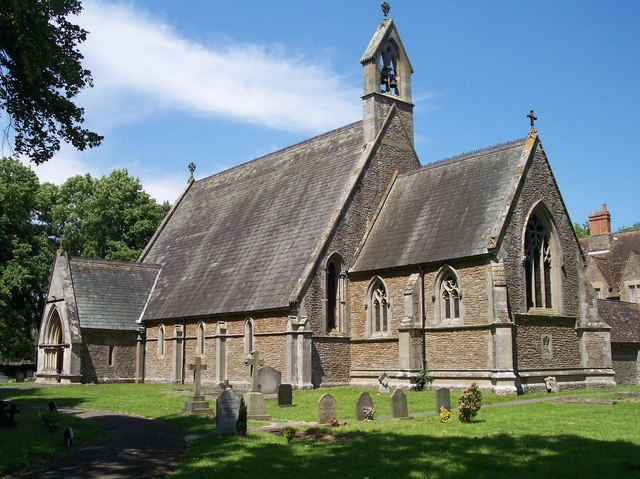
- Our Lady and St Alphonsus Church
- OS grid reference: SO 81233 43648
- Location: Hanley Swan
- Country: England
- Denomination: Catholic
- Website: StJosephUpton.co.uk

History
- Status: Parish church
- Founder: John Vincent Gandolfi
- Dedication: Mary, Mother of Jesus; Alphonsus Liguori

Architecture
- Functional status: Active
- Heritage designation: Grade II* listed
- Designated: 25 March 1968
- Architect: Charles Francis Hansom
- Style: Gothic Revival
- Groundbreaking: 1844
- Completed: 19 August 1846

Administration
- Province: Birmingham
- Archdiocese: Birmingham
- Deanery: Kidderminster & Worcester
- Parish: Upton & Blackmore Park

Our Lady and St Alphonsus Church or Our Blessed Lady and St Alphonsus Church is a Catholic parish church in Blackmore Park, near Hanley Swan, Malvern Hills District, Worcestershire, England. It was built from 1844 to 1846, before the reestablishment of the Catholic dioceses. It was designed by Charles Hansom, with furnishings designed by Augustus Pugin, in the Gothic Revival style. It is located on Hanley Swan road to the north of Hanley Swan. It is a Grade II* listed building.

== History ==
from the 1500s, Blackmore Park estate was owned by a recusant family, the Hornyold family, of whom, Bishop John Hornyold was a descendent. In the early 1800s, the family made money by selling land in Great Malvern for redevelopment. In 1844, John Vincent Gandolfi (1814–1902) asked his uncle, Thomas Charles Hornyold, to provide some land to build a Catholic church, which Gandolfi would pay for. He was the 13th Marquis Gandolfi as he was son of a Genoese noble and silk merchant, also called John Vincent Gandolfi, and he would also go on to rebuild the family mansion.

In 1844, when the land for the church was provided, work began on the construction of the church. Charles Hansom was commissioned by John Vincent Gandolfi to design the church. Hansom was a friend of Gandolfi and he was also recommended to him by Bishop William Ullathorne. According to Historic England, Augustus Pugin "designed most of the fittings" in the church. Architecturally, the church is in the Gothic Revival style. On 19 August 1846, the church was opened and consecrated by Bishop Nicholas Wiseman, who would become a cardinal and Archbishop of Westminster four years later. The consecration was done at the time of the opening because Gandolfi had paid for the entire cost. Furthermore, as well as the church, a school was built and a monastery was constructed next door for the Redemptorist priests who Gandolfi chose to administer the church. The total cost of the buildings came to £30,000.

The stained glass windows of the church was made by William Wailes. Mintons produced floor tiles which were designed by Pugin. He also designed the metalwork, which was made by Hardman & Co. The Redemptorists arrived in 1844. In 1846, their monastery next to the church was finished and they became resident there. In 1850, they started a mission in nearby Upton-upon-Severn. The church there, St Joseph's, was built that year and was also designed by Charles Hansom. In 1851, the Redemptorists moved to Upton, leaving Blackmore Park. The two parish churches went on to be administered by priests from the Archdiocese of Birmingham, and the monastery became a presbytery, before going to be now privately rented.

== Parish ==
In 1980, the two parishes of St Joseph's Church in Upton-upon-Severn and Our Lady and St Alphonsus Church in Blacmore Park became one parish, Upton and Blackmore Park. The two churches each have one Sunday Mass each: Our Lady and St Alphonsus Church has Sunday Mass at 4:00 pm on Saturday and St Joseph's Church has its Sunday Mass at 9:00 am.

== See also ==
- St Wulstan's Church, Little Malvern
