= Malvern Chase =

Royal chase in England

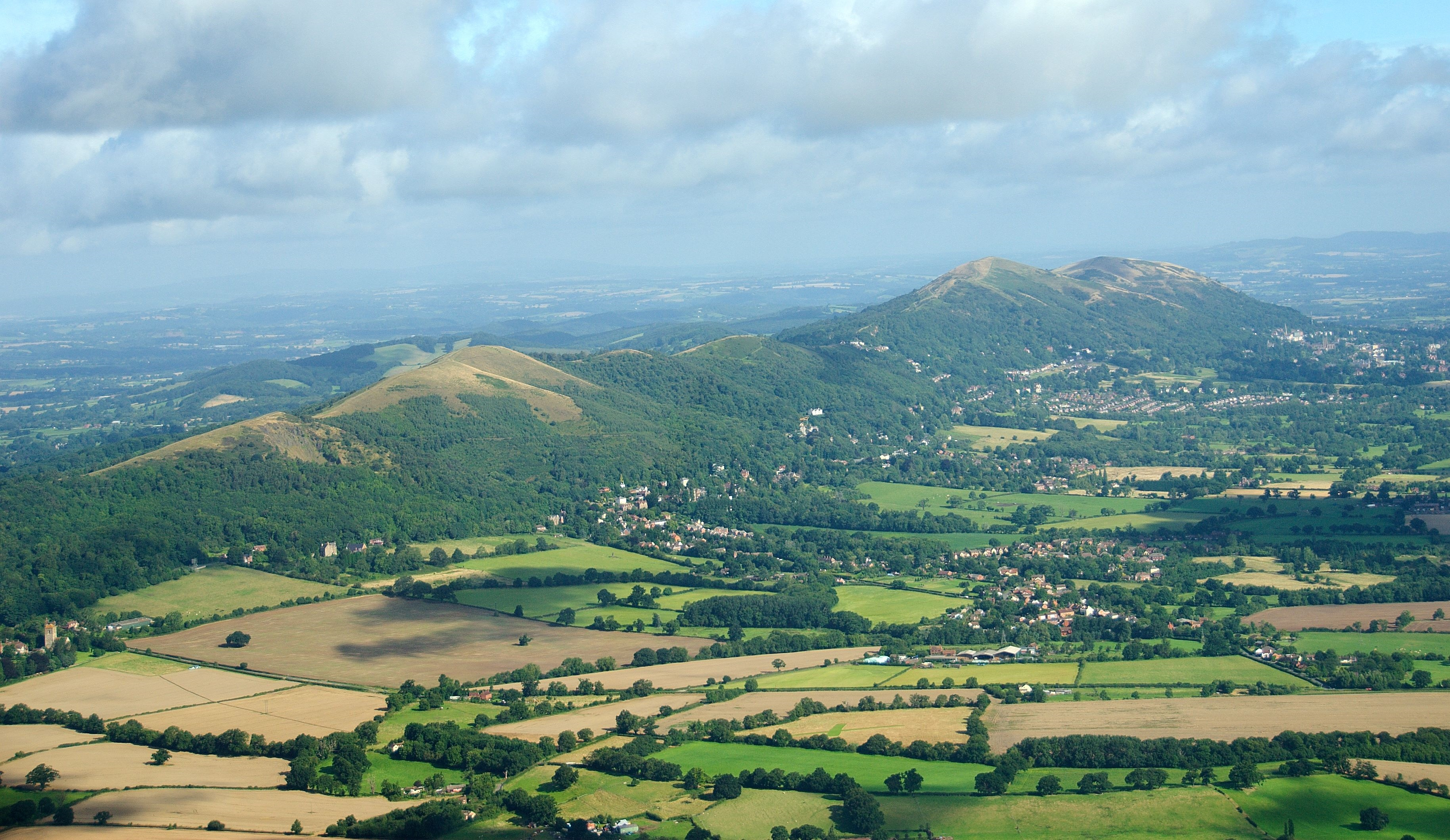
Malvern Chase

Malvern Chase was a royal chase that occupied the land between the Malvern Hills and the River Severn in Worcestershire and extended to Herefordshire from the River Teme to Cors Forest.

The following parishes and hamlets were within the Chase: Hanley Castle, Upton-upon-Severn, Welland, Longdon, Birtsmorton, Castlemorton, Bromsberrow, Berrow, Malvern, Colwall and Mathon.

== History ==
In his book The Forest and Chace of Malvern, Edwin Lees describes the origins of the chase. "Nothing is stated with certainty as to the ownership of the Forest or Wilderness of Malvern before the reign of Edward I, who granted it as Royal property to Gilbert de Clare, Earl of Gloucester, and it was henceforth called a Chace. The second Gilbert de Clare married Maude, daughter of John de Burgh, when the Chaces of Malvern and Cors, with the Castle and Manor of Hanley, were assigned her as a dower; but the Earl being killed in the Scottish war, and having no children by Maude, these possessions went after his death to his sisters, as his heirs, and the eldest, who married Hugh le Despencer the younger, brought them with other possessions into the Despencer family, where they remained till in the third generation, then passing by marriage to Richard Beauchamp, Earl of Warwick, a renowned general in the reign of Henry V who was killed in the French wars."

His son, Henry Beauchamp, created Duke of Warwick by Henry VI, died aged only 22, at Hanley Castle, and was buried in Tewkesbury Abbey. His estates, including Malvern Chase, went to his sister Ann when he died without children. Ann was married to Richard Neville, the celebrated Earl of Warwick, known as the "king-maker." He had two daughters, and the estates were shared between them as his heirs.

Anne Neville was matched to the unfortunate Edward, Prince of Wales, son of Henry VI. and Queen Margaret, killed in the rout after at Tewkesbury. She was married afterwards to Richard Duke of Gloucester later King Richard III.. They had one son, Edward of Middleham, Prince of Wales, who died aged around ten.

Isabella Plantagenet, Duchess of Clarence became the wife of George, Duke of Clarence, who left one son. This son and heir was beheaded in the Tower on pretence of conspiracy by order of Henry VII., who then seized upon all young Warwick's possessions, including the Castle and Manor of Hanley, the parks of Blackmore, Hanley, and Cliffey, all lying in the bosom of the Chace, together with the market town of Upton-upon-Severn; and so these possessions thus unjustly obtained by Henry remained Crown lands till about the year 1630.

=== Attempted disafforestation and riots ===
King Charles I engaged in sale of Royal forests and chases during the 1620s and 30s in an attempt to provide himself with income without recourse to Parliament. In 1630 he granted one-third part of the Forest or Chace of Malvern to Sir Robert Heath, then Attorney-General, and Sir Cornelius Vermuyden. In the meantime many rights or claims of right had arisen by grant or long usages in the lapse of several centuries. When the grantees began to enclose the Chace, the commoners and other persons interested disputed their right to do so. Several riots and disturbances took place in consequence. Such riots were common in these processes, elsewhere being known as the Western Rising.

Nevertheless, a decree was issued in 1632 for the "disafforestation of the Chace of Malvern, and for freeing the lands within the bounds, limits, and jurisdictions thereof, of and from the game of deer there and the forest laws." By this decree (to obviate all disputes) one-third part only was to be severed and divided by commissioners, but the other two parts "shall remain and continue unto and amongst the commoners, and be held by them according to their several rights and interests, discharged and freed from his Majesty's game of deer there, and of and from the forest laws, and the liberties and franchises of Forest and Chace, in such sort as by the said decree it doth and may appear."

Further disputes with landowners resulted in clarifications that any land that was disafforested had to be in proportion to the quality of the land as a whole, so that the common was not the most meagre land.

== Legal status after 1660 ==
King Charles II confirmed the settlement. Commissioners were to judge any further requests for encroachments. The Chace was gradually eroded until the 1800s, when campaigners and renewed interest in the Malvern Hills resulted in the Malvern Hills Act 1884 (47 & 48 Vict. c. clxxv) which appointed Malvern Hills Conservators to preserve the area and govern its land use.

== See also ==
- Chase (land)
- Ancient woodland
- Hunting in the United Kingdom
- List of forests in the United Kingdom
- Medieval deer park
- Surveyor General of Woods, Forests, Parks, and Chases
