= North Bromsgrove High School =

Coordinates: 52.337411°N 2.051868°W

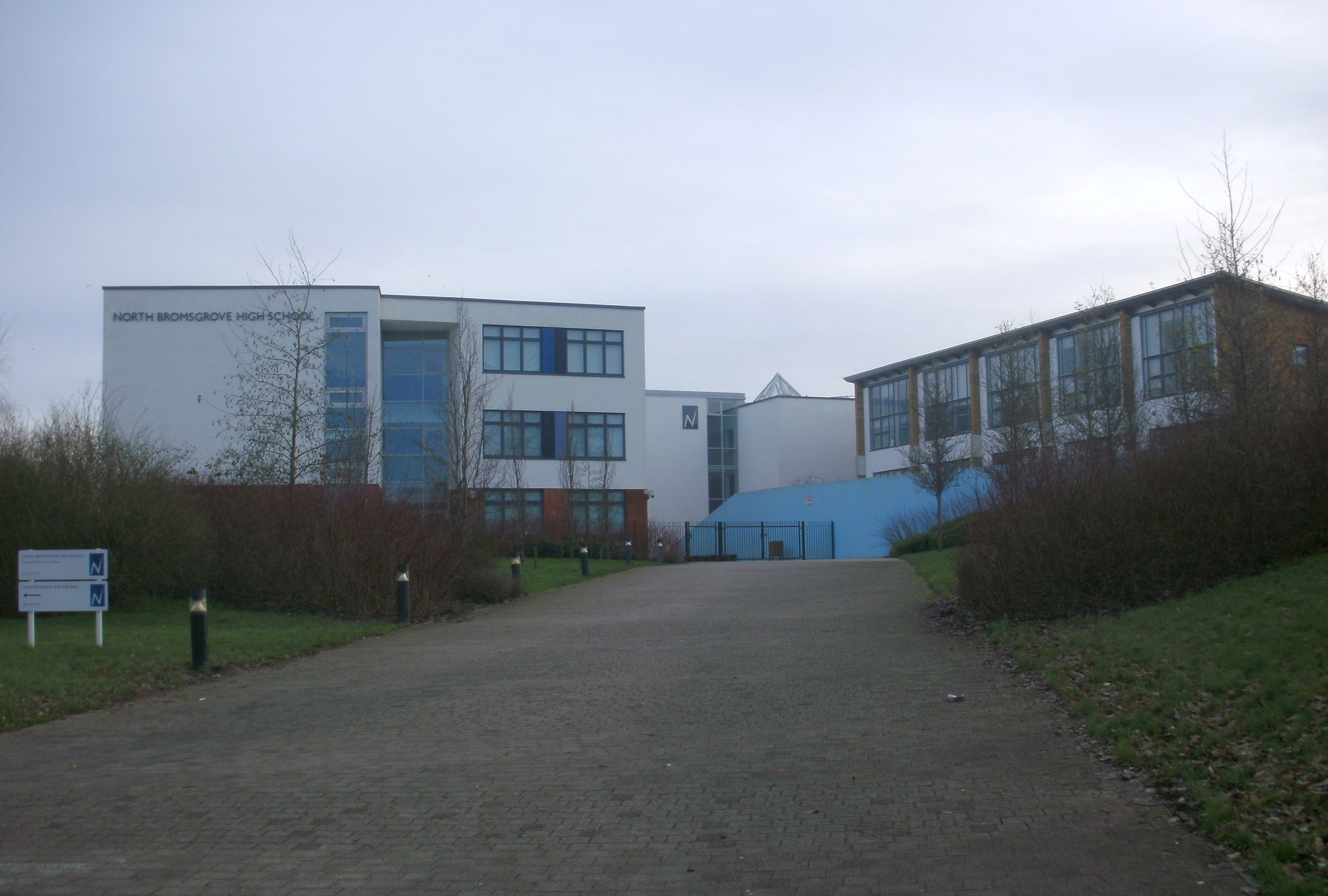

Location
- School Drive, Stratford Road; Bromsgrove, Worcestershire, B60 1BA; England

Information
- Type: Community school
- Motto: Studies Determine Character
- Local authority: Worcestershire County Council
- Department for Education URN: 116928 Tables
- Ofsted: Reports
- Chair of Governors: Sue Milksom
- Headteacher: Nick Gibson
- Gender: Coeducational
- Age: 13 to 18
- Enrolment: 1009
- Sixth form students: 203
- Colours: grey and black
- Website: https://www.northbromsgrove.worcs.sch.uk/

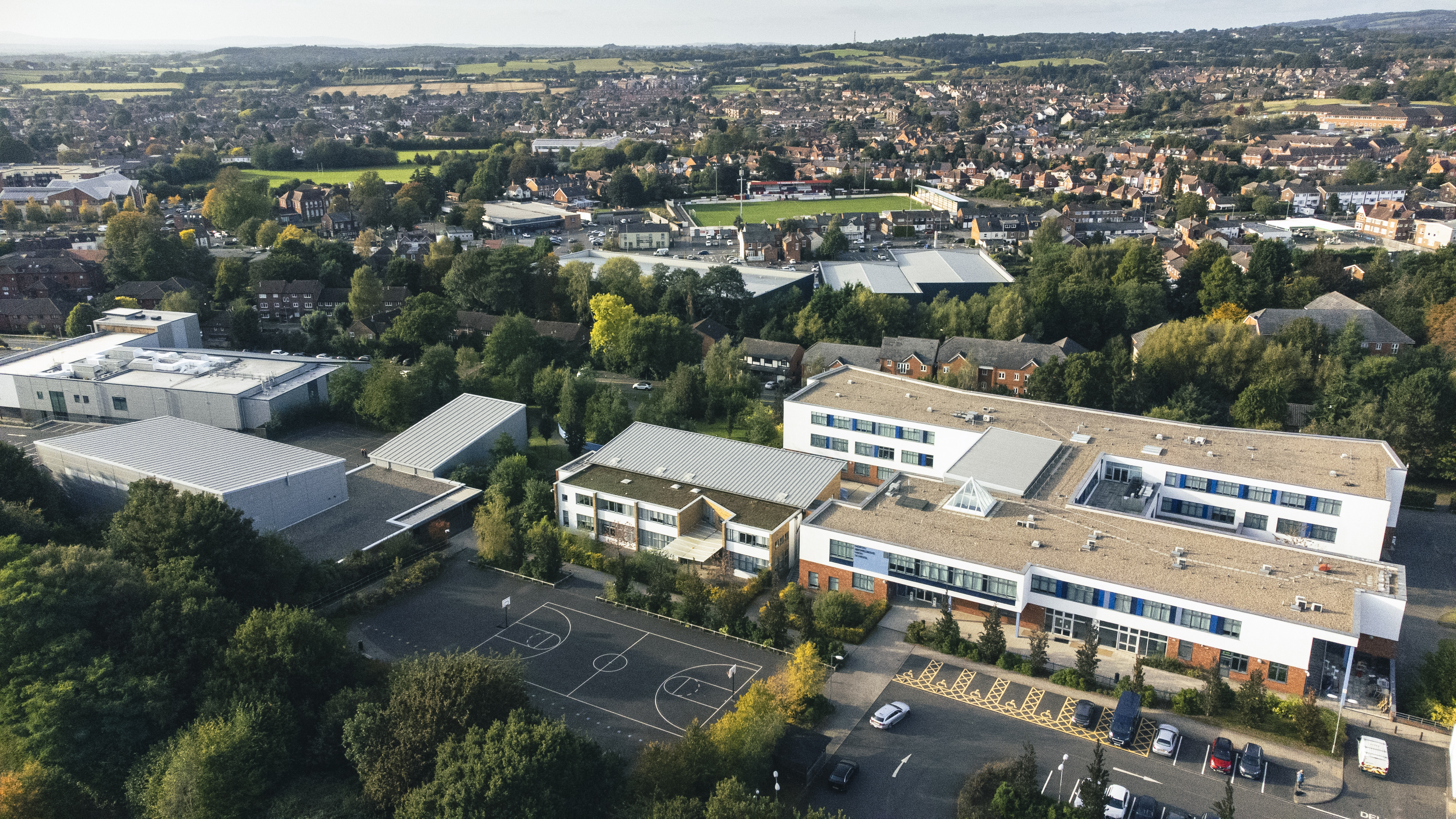
North Bromsgrove High School

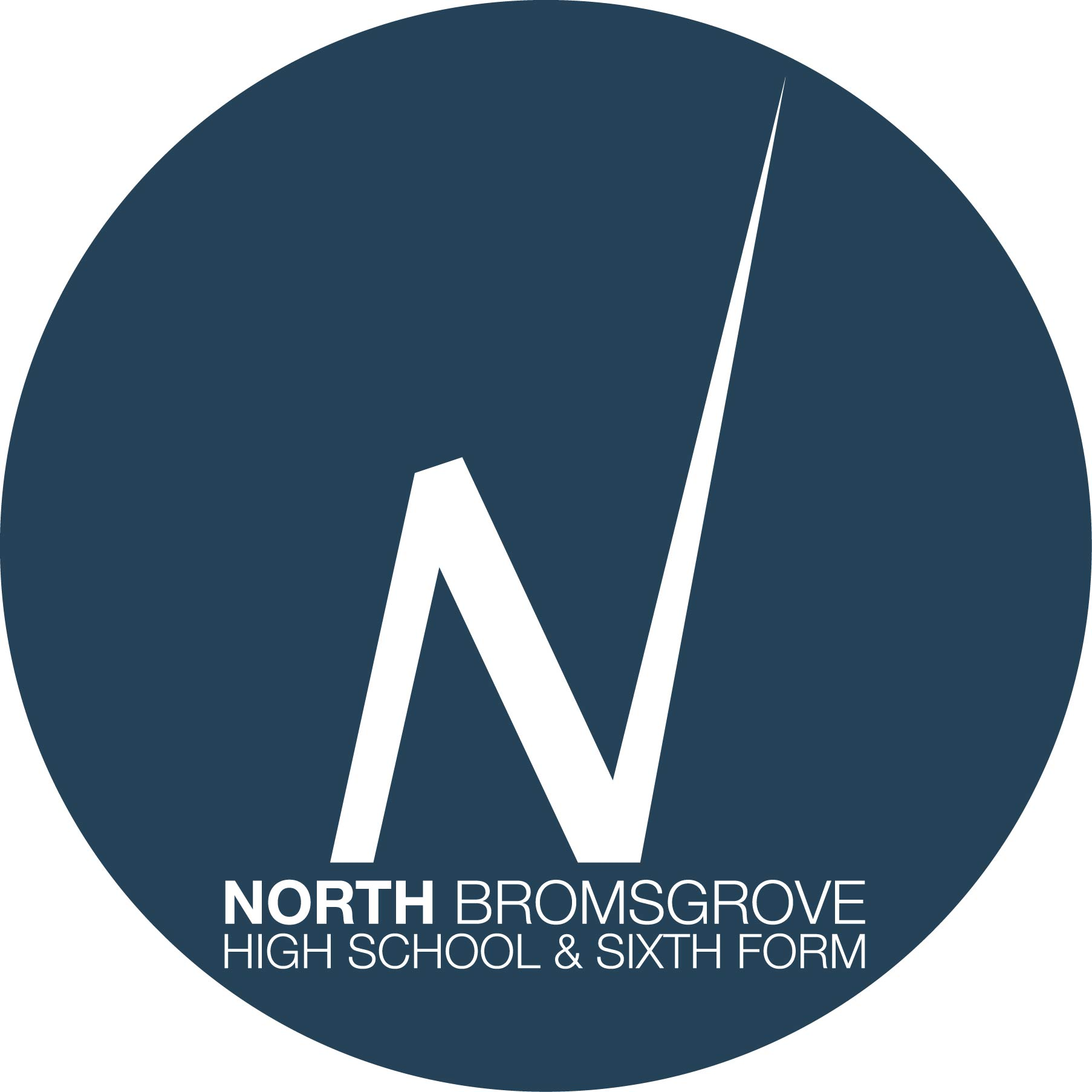
North Bromsgrove High School logo 2014

North Bromsgrove High School is a coeducational upper school and sixth form located in the centre of Bromsgrove, Worcestershire, England.

== History ==
=== Grammar school ===
The school dates back to the co-educational grammar school Bromsgrove County High School.

=== Comprehensive ===
It became comprehensive in 1970, when the grammar school took those at the secondary modern schools of Catshill, Parkside, and Watt Close. The school was rebuilt in 2007 at the same time as it was designated as a specialist Media Arts College.

== Curriculum ==
It offers education for GCSE and A level courses. It accepts students aged 13 to 18 (Years 9-13) from middle schools in the local area and beyond. Nick Gibson was appointed Headteacher in 2019.

== Facilities and curriculum ==
North Bromsgrove High School was rebuilt in 2007 as a private finance initiative. It has five acres of playing fields, a sports hall, gym, dance studio, an Apple Mac suite, drama studio, equipment to deliver music technology, a radio station, and science laboratories. The creative suite has two food rooms, two design and technology rooms for the delivery of engineering and product design, a textiles room, three art and photography rooms, a kiln and a light room.

The school has a specialist mainstream autism base for ten children and a sixth form teaching both A-levels and Level 3 qualifications.

== Catchment ==
The school's main feeder schools are Parkside Middle School and Catshill Middle School. Students also come from Alvechurch Middle School, Aston Fields Middle School and St John's Middle School as well as other middle schools in the surrounding areas of Redditch and Droitwich.

A significant number of students stay on into the school's successful Sixth Form, and applications are accepted from students attending other schools as well.

== Notable alumni ==
- Stacey Francis, England netball player
- Rufus Norris, British theatre director
- Kevin Poole, footballer
- Lauren Rowles MBE, Paralympian gold medallist
- Alison Tedstone, chief nutritionist at Public Health England
- Chris Trenfield, dancer
- Mark Williams, actor

=== Bromsgrove County High School ===
- Fred Holliday CBE, academic
- Francis David Penny CBE FREng, president from 1981-82 of the Institution of Mechanical Engineers, director from 1967-69 of the National Engineering Laboratory
- Trudie Styler, actress and producer

=== Notable teaching staff ===
- David Rudkin, playwright
- Clifford T. Ward, singer/songwriter
