= Mercia Inshore Search and Rescue =

Disbanded water rescue team in Upton-upon-Severn, Worcestershire

Mercia Inshore Search and Rescue (MISAR), also known as Mercia Rescue, was a water rescue team operating from the marina in Upton-upon-Severn, Worcestershire, England, established in 2005 when it split from Severn Area Rescue Association (SARA).

Mercia Rescue was a registered charity, staffed by volunteers reliant upon donations. The team are currently developing an NVQ qualification in water-borne rescue skills that will be made available to other rescue organisations in the near future.

Training in boat handling and VHF Marine Radio is to RYA standards, and Swiftwater rescue training to the American National Fire Protection Association (NFPA) 1670 Standard on Operations and Training for Technical Rescue is undertaken with the Rescue3 company in Bala, Wales. All qualifications are encompassed within a unique 10 unit training programme designed to maximise the skills, knowledge and professionalism of the working crews.

MISAR was a partner of the Environment Agency for the Upton flood barrier scheme.

MISAR was disbanded in 2020, with all assets transferred to SARA.

== See also ==
- Royal National Lifeboat Institution covers the River Severn downstream of Avonmouth
- Severn Area Rescue Association covers the River Severn upstream of Avonmouth to Wyre Forest
