= Dorothy Thompson (historian) =

British historian (1923–2011)

Dorothy Katharine Gane Thompson (née Towers; 30 October 1923 – 29 January 2011) was a social historian and a leading expert on the Chartist movement. She and her husband (and fellow historian) E. P. Thompson became well known in left-wing intellectual circles.

== Early life ==
Dorothy Towers was born in Greenwich, south-east London, daughter of professional musicians Reginald and Kathleen Towers, who met at the Royal Academy of Music. To supplement their income, they were teachers and ran shops selling musical instruments, and later televisions. They were supporters, but not members, of the Labour Party. Her paternal grandfather, a shoemaker, had settled in London. Due to the ill health of her elder brother, Tom, the family lived at the agricultural village of Keston, in a four-room cottage, before moving to Bromley. In 1942, Thompson entered Girton College, Cambridge as an exhibitioner, graduating with an upper second.

== Career ==
During the war, her work as an industrial draughtswoman for Royal Dutch Shell interrupted her formal education. In 1944, she married Gilbert Buchanan Sale, a student at Pembroke College, Cambridge. Despite her studies and work, she continued to pursue a career in history and was politically active. She joined the Young Communists, and, having divorced her first husband, married the historian Edward Thompson in 1948, and moved to Halifax, where Edward worked in adult education and they were both active in the peace movement. They had three children, including Kate Thompson.

With husband E. P. Thompson, she was part of the dissenting group in the Communist Party of Great Britain which in 1956-7 set up the socialist humanist journal the New Reasoner, where her competence meant her principal role was "business manager". She broke with the Communists and identified as a Socialist. She was inspired working with writers, artists, historians and trade unionists in the formation of new left clubs in many towns; she admired such figures as the Scottish miners' champion Lawrence Daly and clothing worker Gertie Roche.

In 1970 Thompson was appointed a lecturer in the School of History at the University of Birmingham, where she remained until 1988. She was also a visiting scholar on a number of occasions at universities in the United States, as well as in Canada, China and Japan. The Early Chartists (1971) was a groundbreaking collection of documents. The Chartists (1984) set out all the ways in which Thompson sought to revise how Chartism was seen - from the Irish leaders to the vital contribution of women. In January 1995 Thompson was presented with a festschrift, The Duty of Discontent. Edited by Owen Ashton, Stephen Roberts (both her former students) and Robert Fyson, the volume consists of 12 essays spanning the whole range of nineteenth- and twentieth-century British social history. The title was taken from a lecture by Chartist poet Thomas Cooper. The importance of Thompson's writings on Chartism and Irish and women's history is recognised by scholars internationally. Her work, like that of her husband, was always been informed by a passionate radicalism and a deep sympathy for the underdog.

Thompson's position as the most influential historian of Chartism has been reinforced by two volumes of essays: Outsiders (1993) and The Dignity of Chartism (2015).

== Selected articles/works ==
- The Early Chartists (1971)
- Bibliography of the Chartist Movement, 1837–1976 (edited with J. F. C. Harrison) (1978)
- The Chartist Experience : Studies in Working-class Radicalism and Culture, 1830–60 (edited with James Epstein) (1982)
- Over Our Dead Bodies : Women against the Bomb (editor) (1983)
- The Chartists: Popular Politics in the Industrial Revolution (1984); (reprinted Breviary Stuff Publications, 2013)
- Chartism in Wales and Ireland (1987)
- British Women in the Nineteenth Century (1989)
- Queen Victoria: Gender and Power (1990)
- Outsiders : Class, Gender and Nation (1993)
- Images of Chartism (edited with Stephen Roberts) (1998).
- Selected Poems by Frank Thompson, edited by Dorothy Thompson and Kate Thompson (2003)
- The Dignity of Chartism: Essays by Dorothy Thompson (edited by Stephen Roberts) (2015)

== See also ==
- List of peace activists
