= Hanley Castle (castle) =

13th-century fortification in Worcestershire, England

Coordinates: 52.07162°N 2.23922°W

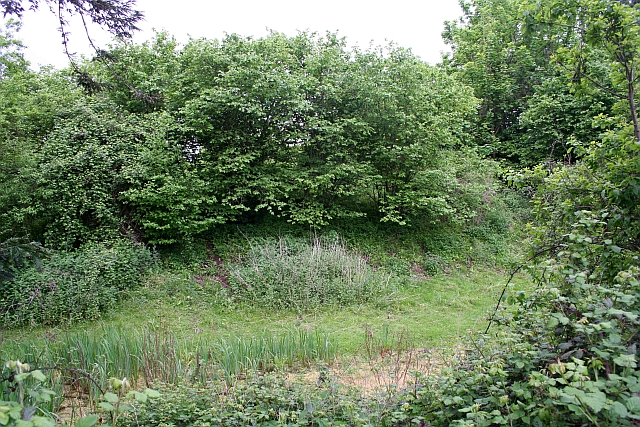
Remnant of the moat

Hanley Castle was a Norman castle that stood to the south of the present-day site of the village of Hanley Castle, which lies 2 km north of Upton-upon-Severn, in the county of Worcestershire, England, United Kingdom. (grid reference SO837415).

== 13th-century castle ==
The castle was built by King John between 1206 and 1212. In 1216, it was given by Henry III to Gilbert de Clare, 4th Earl of Hertford and it remained in the powerful de Clare family until 1314.

After that date there was a succession of owners until the castle was surrendered with the manor to the Crown in 1487. The castle gradually fell into decay and was mostly demolished due to its ruined state during the reign of Henry VIII. The masonry of the only remaining tower is said to have been removed in 1795 to repair the bridge at Upton upon Severn.

No traces of the castle building now remain. A modern house which stood on some portion of the site was destroyed by fire in January 1904. The site is marked by tall conifers and a dry remnant of the moat ditch and bank.
