= Upton upon Severn Memorial Hall =

Municipal building in Upton upon Severn, Worcestershire, England

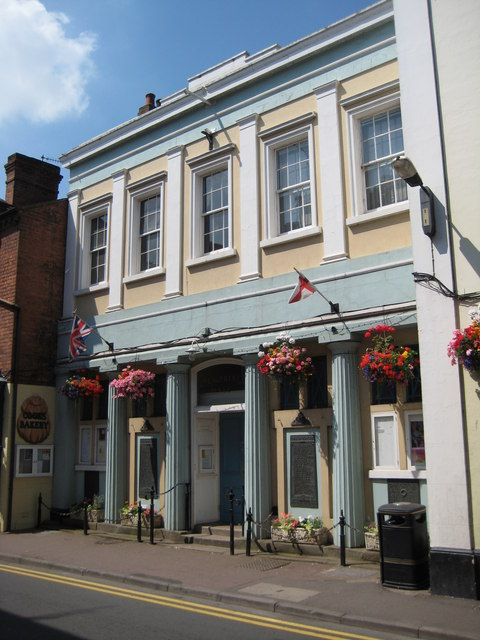
- The building in 2008

- Shown in Worcestershire
- 52.0630°N 2.2180°W
- Location: Old Street, Upton upon Severn

History
- Built: 1832

Site notes
- Architectural style: Greek Revival style

Listed Building – Grade II
- Official name: Memorial Hall
- Designated: 29 March 1983
- Reference no.: 1227111

Upton upon Severn Memorial Hall, formerly known as Upton-upon-Severn Town Hall, is a municipal building in Old Street in Upton upon Severn, a town in Worcestershire in England. The building, which serves as the offices and meeting place of Upton upon Severn Town Council, is a Grade II listed building.

== History ==
The building was commissioned by the authority of an act of parliament as the local market hall. It was designed in the neoclassical style, built in brick and was completed in 1832. The design involved a symmetrical main frontage of five bays facing onto Old Street. The building was arcaded on the ground floor so that markets could be held with an assembly hall on the first floor. The assembly hall was used as courtroom for the petty sessions as well as a town hall, and there was a jail in the cellar.

Between 1920 and 1921, the building was converted to serve as a lasting memorial to local service personnel who had died in the First World War: the work was carried out to a design by H. Rowe and Son, and featured four bronze memorial plaques, which recorded the names of the people who had died.

The building became the offices and meeting place of Upton-upon-Severn Parish Council and was re-roofed by the parish council in 1953. After local government re-organisation in 1974, when the parish council was succeeded by a town council, the first floor became the offices and meeting place of Upton upon Severn Town Council, while the main hall became available for hire. It became a popular venue for concerts with groups such as The Subhumans performing there in the mid-1980s.

The architectural historian, Nikolaus Pevsner, described the building as "modest... in fact [an] undetached terraced house".

== Architecture ==
The two-storey building is five bays wide, the ground floor having a Doric colonnade, which was open until the memorial plaques were added. The first floor has pilasters and an entablature, and there is a cellar with brick arches. It was grade II listed in 1983.
