= Wolverley Church of England Secondary School =

Wolverley C E Secondary School

Location
- Wolverley; Kidderminster, Worcestershire, DY11 5XQ; England
- 52°25′01″N 2°15′14″W

Information
- Type: Voluntary controlled comprehensive
- Religious affiliation: Church of England
- Established: 2007
- Local authority: Worcestershire County Council
- Specialist: Music
- Department for Education URN: 135061 Tables
- Ofsted: Reports
- Chair: Karen McGrath
- Headteacher: Rebecca Hawthorne (Acting)
- Gender: Mixed
- Age: 11 to 18
- Enrolment: 671 (2015)
- Houses: Hurcott; Lea; Blakeshall; Drakelow; Kingsford
- Website: http://www.wolverley.worcs.sch.uk/

Wolverley CofE Secondary School is located in the village of Wolverley, near Kidderminster in Worcestershire, England. The mixed gender school has approximately 670 students on roll (2014) and opened in 2007 following the closure of its predecessor, Wolverley High School, as part of the local area reorganisation from three-tier education. At the same time, the school became a controlled Church of England school.

The school accepts students aged 11 to 18, and offers courses at GCSE and A-Level. The February 2014 Ofsted inspection results, published in March 2014, reported the school as being 'a school that requires improvement'. Later inspections in June 2016 and November 2021 both rated the school as ‘Good’.

== History ==
Wolverley CE Secondary School opened in 2007 following the closure of Wolverley High School and a restructuring in the Worcestershire Local Authority. At the same time it converted to a controlled Church of England School. Wolverley was the birthplace of William Sebright, a former Town Clerk of London. Sebright died in 1620 and his will stated that his estate was to be used for the foundation of a grammar school in Wolverley. The original site of the school was in the centre of the village, but in 1931 the school changed its name to Sebright School and moved to a new site. Between 1948 and 1970, Sebright was a private school, before reopening as Wolverley High School.

== Achievement ==
Percentage of students gaining 5 A*-C grades at GCSE.

- 2011: 36%
- 2012: 53%
- 2013: 48%
- 2014: 47%
- 2015: 45%

== Sports ==
In 2014 the rugby team at Wolverley became The Wolverley Whirlwinds. They play against those of King Charles I School, The Bewdley School, Baxter College, Stourport High School and The Chantry School.
