= Stephen Roberts (historian) =

British historian

Stephen Frederick Roberts (1958 – July 2022) was an historian of nineteenth-century Britain who wrote extensively about Chartism and Birmingham in the Victorian era. He was educated at Bishop Vesey's Grammar School in Sutton Coldfield and the University of Birmingham, from where he held B.A. and M.Litt. degrees.

At the University of Birmingham Roberts was taught by leading historian of Chartism, Dorothy Thompson, a major influence on his work. This is reflected in the co-editing of a festschrift for Thompson entitled The Duty of Discontent (1995), a collaboration with her on a collection of contemporary illustrations entitled Images of Chartism (1998) and the editing of a posthumous collection of her writings entitled The Dignity of Chartism (2015).

== Life ==
Born in Sutton Coldfield, Roberts studied history at the University of Birmingham completing a master and bachelor's degree. Roberts studied Victorian Britain, publishing various papers and books on the political, socioeconomic, and societal environment of the period. For thirty years he held a teaching post at Hagley Catholic High School in Worcestershire whilst at the same time being a Fellow of the Institute for Advanced Research in Arts and Social Sciences at the University of Birmingham. He has described how a day might begin by teaching the Great Plague of 1665 to teenagers and might finish giving a paper on Chartism to a university seminar attended by venerable professors. For a brief period, Roberts also taught at Newman University, Birmingham.

Roberts spoke about the Chartists on BBC Radio 3, BBC Radio 4 and Radio WM. Since 2015 he had been visiting fellow at the Australian National University.

== Works ==
At the University of Birmingham Roberts wrote a Master of Letters dissertation on Thomas Cooper. He was the author of two monographs on Chartism: 'Radical Politicians and Poets in Early Victorian Britain' (1993) and 'The Chartist Prisoners' (2008). He also wrote, with Owen Ashton, a study of working class authorship entitled 'The Victorian Working Class Author' (1999) and has edited, with Owen Ashton and Robert Fyson, a bibliography entitled 'The Chartist Movement' and a collection of essays entitled 'The Chartist Legacy' (1999). Roberts has also looked at these times from the other side of the political spectrum, editing, with Mark Acton, a collection of material relating to the colourful ultra-Tory MP for Lincoln, Charles Sibthorp.

Roberts' interest in a biographical approach to writing history was reflected also in his work on Victorian Birmingham. His series "Birmingham Biographies"(www.birmingham-biographies) sought to recover the stories of Birmingham politicians and businessmen who have been overshadowed by Joseph Chamberlain. This series consists of short biographies of, amongst others, the photographer Sir Benjamin Stone (2014), the entrepreneur Sir Richard Tangye (2015) and the pen maker and art collector Joseph Gillott (2017). These men are gently sent up in Mocking Men of Power, a collection of contemporary cartoons co-edited with Roger Ward. This book draws on Birmingham's satirical magazines The Dart and The Owl. Birmingham 1889: One Year in a Victorian City(2017) also makes extensive use of these magazines.

== Publications on Chartism ==
- Radical Politicians and Poets in Early Victorian Britain (Mellen, 1993)
- The Chartist Movement, A New Annotated Bibliography (Continuum, 1995)
- The Duty of Discontent: Essays for Dorothy Thompson (Continuum, 1995)
- Images of Chartism (Merlin, 1998)
- The Victorian Working Class Writer (Continuum, 1999)
- The Chartist Legacy (Merlin, 1999)
- The People's Charter (Merlin, 2003)
- The Chartist Prisoners (Lang, 2008)
- The Dignity of Chartism (2015)

== Publications on Victorian Birmingham ==
- Dr. J. A. Langford (2014)
- Sir Benjamin Stone (2014)
- Mocking Men of Power (2014)
- Sir Richard Tangye (2015)
- Joseph Chamberlain's Highbury (2015)
- Now Mr Editor! (2015)
- Joseph Gillott (2016)
- Birmingham 1889 (2017)

== Victorian Lincoln ==
- The Parliamentary Career of Charles de Laet Waldo Sibthorp (2010)
