= Chase (land) =

Type of common land used for hunting in the United Kingdom

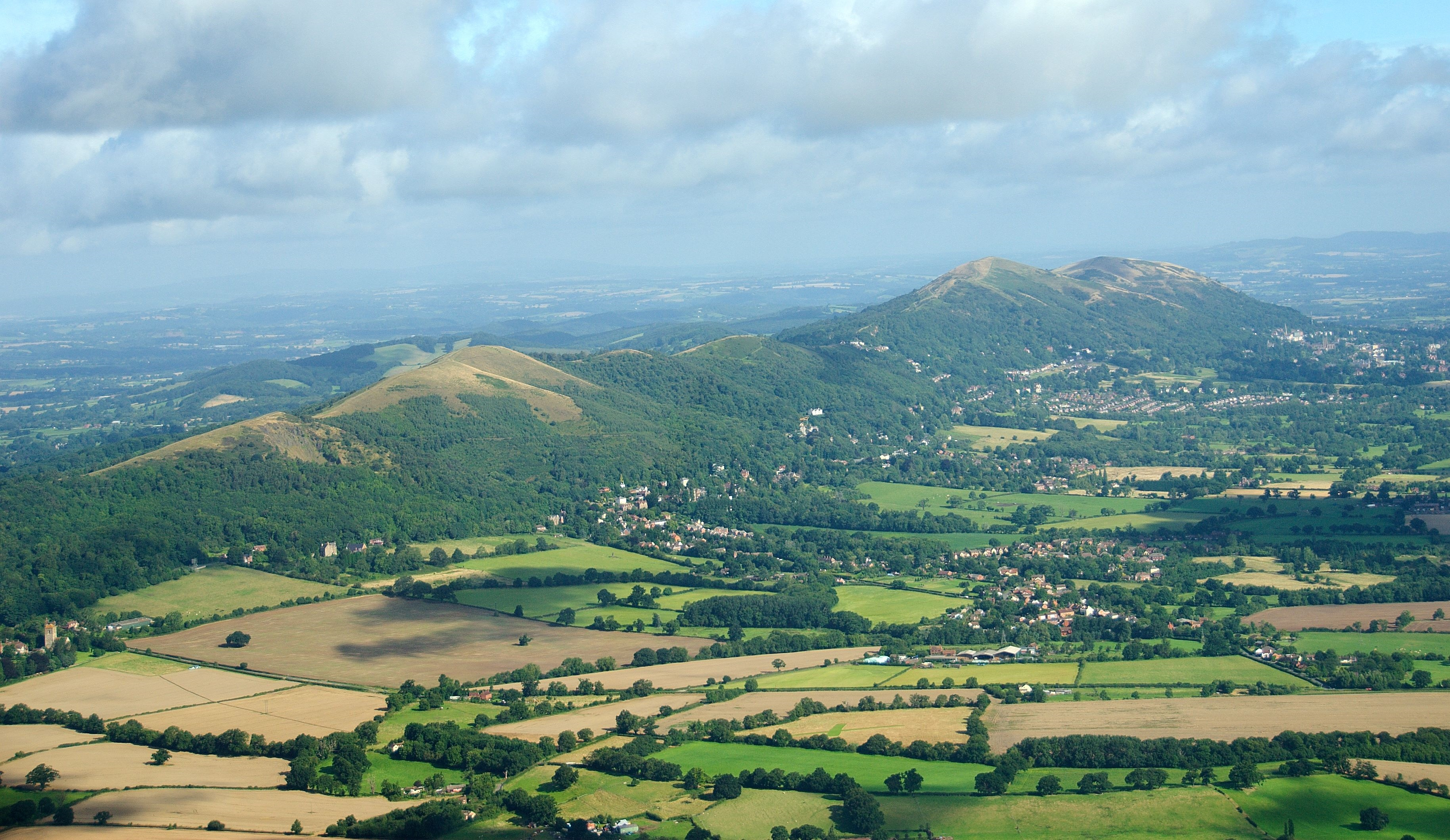
Malvern Chase

Chase is a term used in the United Kingdom to define a type of land reserved for hunting use by its owner. Similarly, a royal chase is a chase held by the Crown.

The term 'chase' is also used in Australia to describe some national parks. Flinders Chase National Park is on Kangaroo Island in South Australia and Ku-ring-gai Chase National Park is in New South Wales.

== Rights and history ==
The Victoria County History describes a chase as:

"like a forest, uninclosed, and only defined by metes and bounds; but it could be held by a subject. Offences committed therein were, as a rule, punishable by the common law and not by forest jurisdiction."

Chases are often identified by open clearings, soil type, and retaining additional heath rather than forests for hunting purposes.

Chases faced mass enclosure by private (specifically local) acts of Parliament. This type of privatization primarily occurred through the heyday between about 1750 and 1850. Enclosure converted many chases from public to private lands to some extent. After these conversions, in many areas the private lands were converted for residential, commercial, industrial or transport infrastructure use. However, the chases listed (see examples) remain largely undiminished by staying a Common, or by a gift to a public body whether to avoid inheritance tax or motivated by philanthropy.

== Examples ==
Some examples of chases in England include Wyre Forest, which straddles Worcestershire and Shropshire, Malvern Chase in Worcestershire, Pensnett Chase near Dudley and Cranborne Chase spanning Hampshire, Dorset and Wiltshire.

Cannock Chase in Staffordshire had once been previously recognized during the Middle Ages as a Royal Forest; however, in 1290 the Bishop of Lichfield's woods within it were granted to him as a free chase, which passed in 1546 to William Paget, later Baron Paget of Beaudesert.

== Comparative status ==
Chases and royal chases are beneath the status of forests designations and royal forests, respectively. Since the late Medieval Period, the word "forest" has come to mean any large woodland. Virtually all of the National Parks, AONB forests or significant other forests have officers and laws that apply only to them.

== See also ==
- Ancient woodland
- Hunting in the United Kingdom
- List of forests in the United Kingdom
- Medieval deer park
- Surveyor General of Woods, Forests, Parks, and Chases
