= Battle of Upton =

Part of the Third English Civil War (1651)

- Part of The Third English Civil War
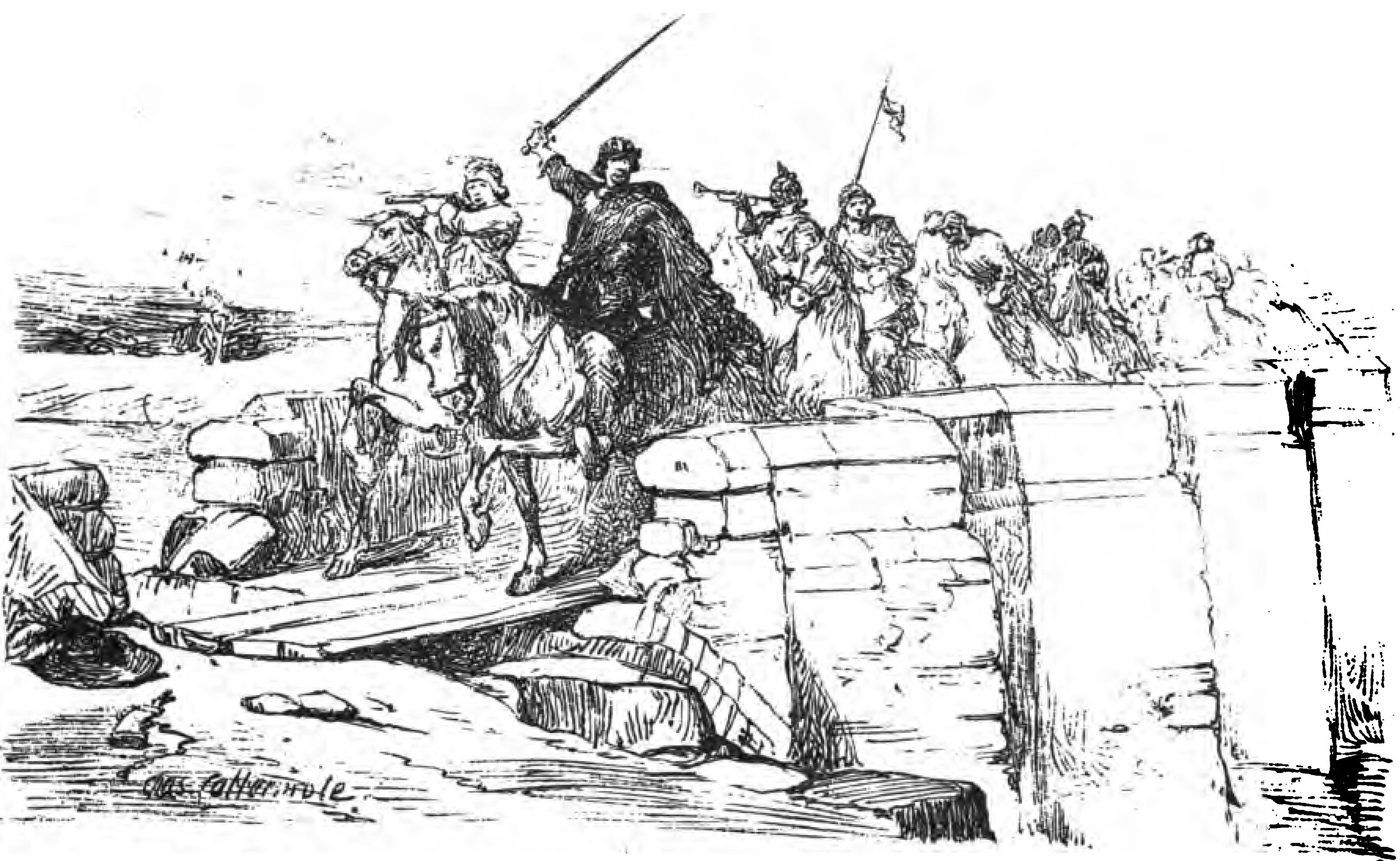
- The Taking of Upton Bridge
Date	28 August 1651
Location	Upton-upon-Severn Worcestershire 52.065°N 2.218°W
Result	Parliamentarian victory
Territorial changes	Aided in the capture of Worcester

Belligerents
Royalists	Parliamentarians

Commanders and leaders
Edward Massey	John Lambert

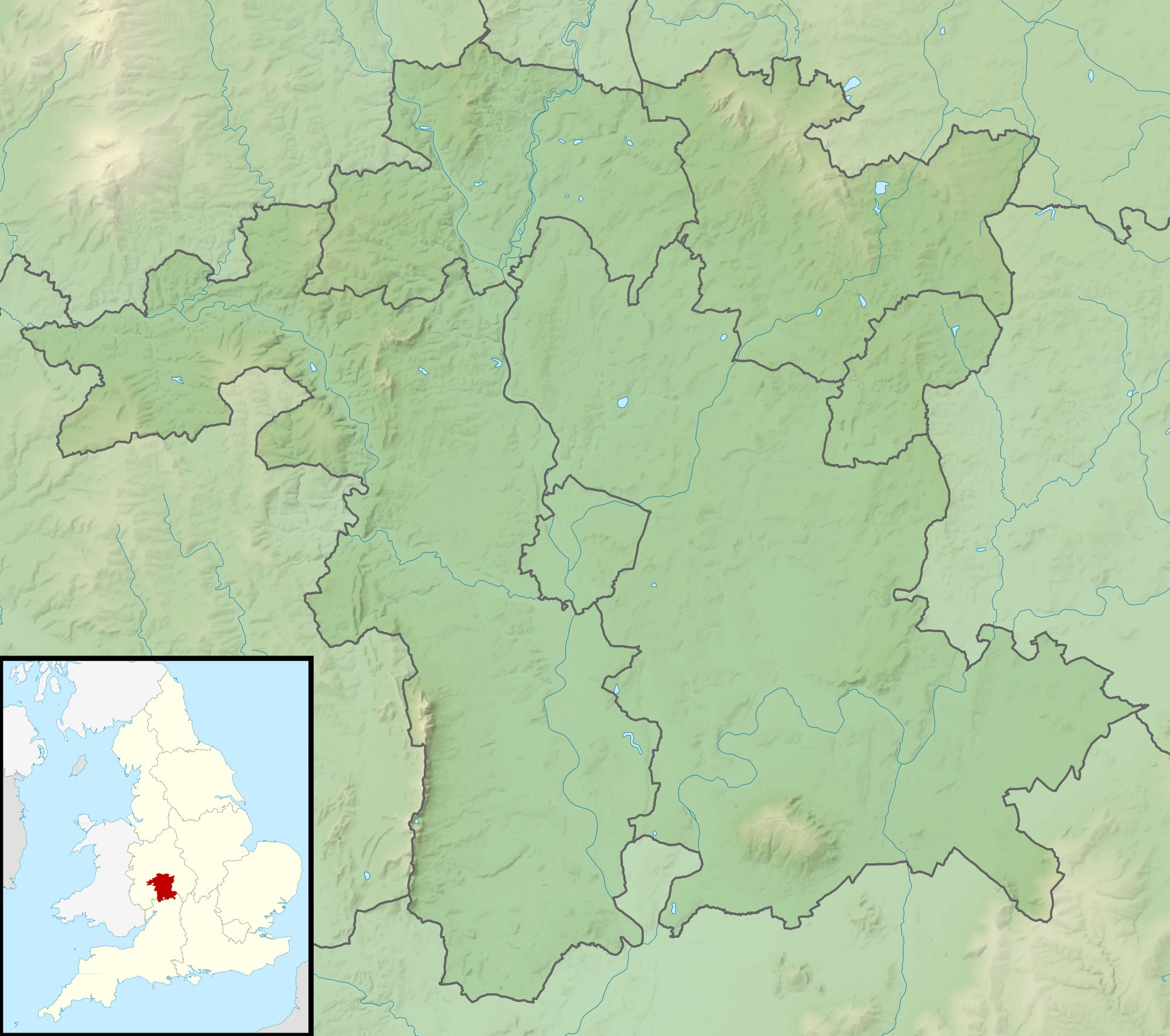
Worcestershire and Upton

The Battle of Upton was fought on 28 August 1651 when a New Model Army detachment under the command of Colonel John Lambert made a surprise attack on Royalists defending the river Severn crossing at Upton-upon-Severn, 6 miles (9.7 km) below Worcester. In the action which followed, the Royalist commander Major General Edward Massey was severely wounded and the surviving Royalists were driven out of the town and north along the Worcester Road.

The successful attack allowed Parliamentary forces to approach Worcester from the west and was an important action in completing Cromwell's investment of Worcester as a prelude to his assault and capture of the city.

== Prelude ==
On his return from Scotland Oliver Cromwell took command of the Parliamentary forces arrayed against the Royalist army encamped in and around Worcester. Initially he concentrated his forces at Evesham which blocked any Royalist advance on London.

Cromwell's force at Evesham were increasing daily. By the time he arrived in person on 27 August his forces out-numbered the Royalists by nearly two to one and he was able to carry out the second part of his plan, which was to cut off the Royalists from Wales and the west.

His first planned act was to occupy the west bank of the River Severn. To do this, on the next day, 28 August, a strong detachment, both horse (cavalry) and foot (infantry), under the command of Colonel John Lambert, was ordered to march from Evesham to Upton-upon-Severn and drive Major General Edward Massey from there, by taking possession of the bridge and occupying the town (which is located on the west bank of the Severn).

Leaving Evesham, Lambert's detachment marched the 13 miles (21 km), arriving on the east bank of the Severn at Upton that the evening. They found the bridge broken down, but a plank had been left across the ruined arches by which it was possible that a few daring men might, with some danger and difficulty, effect a passage and surprise the Royalists encamped on the West bank in the town. Lambert resolved to try.

Massey was quartered in the village of Hanley Castle, at Severn End, a house of the Lechmeres, about a mile away, on the Worcester Road; his men were billeted in the town. Some slight earthworks had been thrown up between the town and the brook on the Worcester Road, which formed a strong position to resist any advance made along the road.

Lambert saw that if the Upton was defended it would be impossible to carry it in its then state. There was just one chance: the Royalists might keep a bad look-out, as no sentries were posted, possibly they had no idea any enemy was near. To cross the river was a service of difficulty and danger, but unless the river was crossed the plan laid down could not proceed. Lambert, therefore, determined to take the risk.

== Battle ==
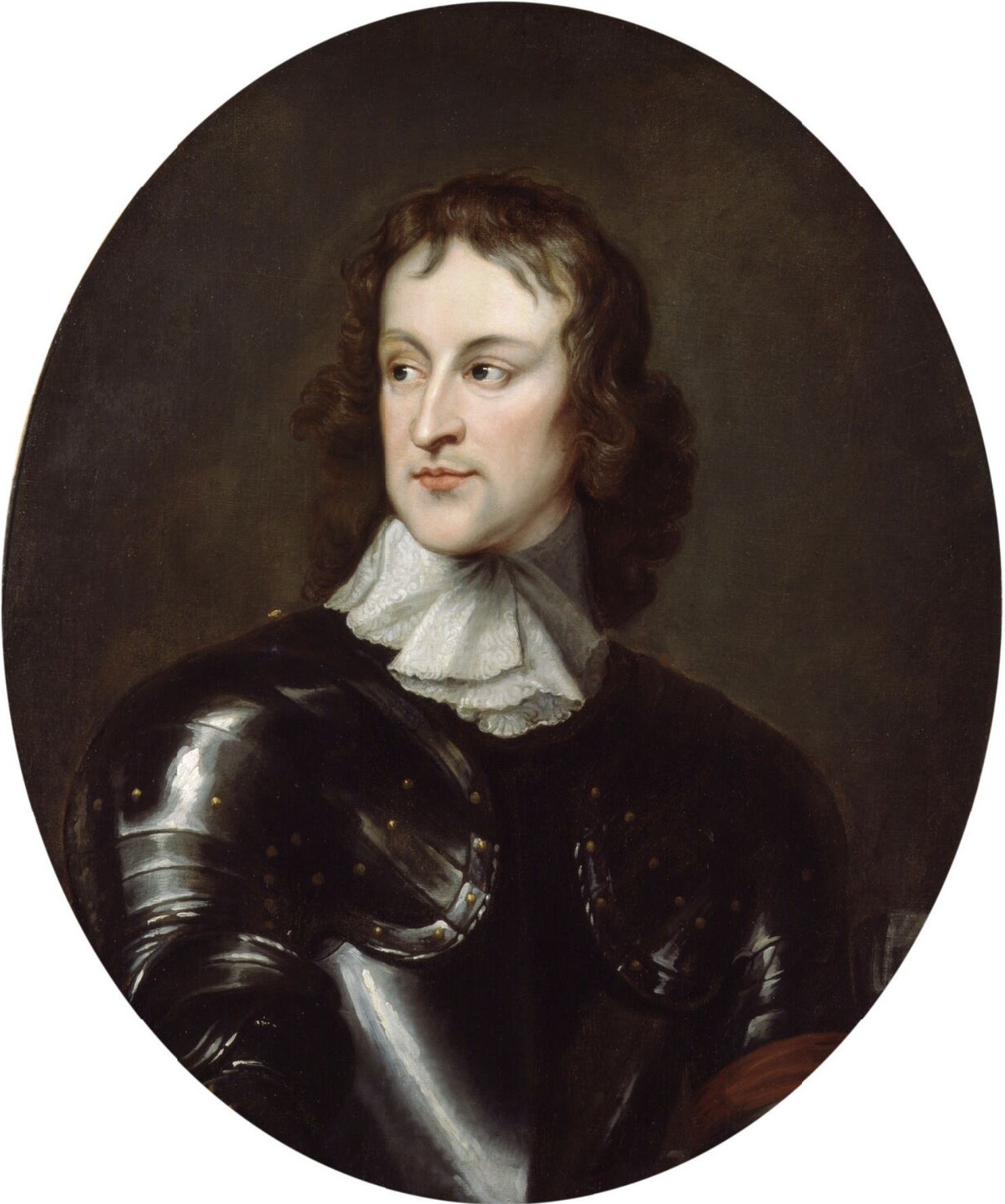
Lambert

During the night Lambert kept his men out of sight at Ryall, so as to raise no suspicion or alarm. At daybreak, selecting eighteen of his best men from his force, he ordered them to cross the bridge and, as soon as they had done so, to seek some shelter in Upton, so as to be able to hold the bridgehead until they were reinforced.

On 29 August, in the grey morning light, as dawn was breaking, the eighteen started on their mission. Never were troops given a harder task than Lambert's men were now called upon to perform. In dim daylight to walk in single file over a long, narrow plank, high above a deep, rapid river, with the prospect each moment of being fired upon, was a task before which the bravest might quail. When they got on to the plank, and began to march in single file, they could not face the running water below them; they were in danger of falling. So they sat down on the plank, straddling across it, scrambling along. After some delay all reached the Upton bank in safety.

There some hot work awaited them. As they formed up the Royalists perceived that they had crossed the river and at once attacked them fiercely. Carrying out their orders Lambert's men retreated, first into the churchyard, then, finding that their numbers were too few to enable them to defend it with success, into the church itself, fastened the door, and fired through the windows on the Royalists. The attack was determined. The Royalists pushed on up to the church, but, unable to effect an entrance, set fire to the building, and shot at the survivors of the group through the windows, trying to thrust at them with their pikes, or cut them down with their swords. The survivors held out bravely, returned their assailants' fire, causing them some loss. Massey, awoken by the sound of the firing, at once set off to his men and directed the attack on the church.

All of the eighteen were, to all appearances, doomed. Over the bridge, with the Royalists now on the alert, no passage over the bridge was possible. Under the fire that would be poured on it no one would live to walk the plank. Lambert was loth to leave his men without an effort to save them. The river was low, the tide was out. It was said to be fordable, but that the ford was difficult and dangerous, but possible. Lambert decided it should be risked. At the spot below the bridge, known now as Fisher's Row, where the ford was said to be, Lambert ordered his dragoons to enter the river, get through at all risks, and relieve the men in the church. The dragoons entered the river; floundering about, partly fording, partly swimming, in some way they got through.

Forming up on the Upton bank, they charged on the rear of the Royalists, who were attacking the church. Surprised at this unexpected and sudden charge, the Royalists at first gave way, but, recovering from their surprise, rallied, and in turn charged the dragoons, driving them back, killing several men, and many horses. Lambert however, having found that it was possible to ford the river, did not leave his men unsupported; he sent more horse across, so the Royalists rapidly became out-numbered. Fighting fiercely, they were only driven away from the church by Lambert's superior numbers; but they were driven back, and what remained of the eighteen soldiers were rescued.

Not satisfied with the rescue, Lambert resolved to complete his work. The Royalists retired into their entrenchments; they were to be driven out, Lambert ordered the entrenchments to be stormed. Again the fight was sharp. The Royalists, now on the defensive, fought well, and had the fight been on anything like equal terms Lambert would have failed to carry the works; but to the Royalists no reinforcements could come, while the assailants were constantly increasing in number. Planks had been placed over the arches, so the troops could now pass easily over the bridge into Upton. Massey, who already had a horse shot under him, now fell sorely wounded.

Discouraged by the loss of their leader, the increasing number of the enemy, their continuous and sustained attacks, the 300 Royalists at last gave way. Lambert's men carried the earthworks, the Royalists, abandoning camp, baggage, and wounded, made off as fast as possible along the Worcester Road.

It has been said that the rout was so complete that each horseman took up a footman behind him so that they might make off with greater rapidity. However this can hardly be true. Not only were very few prisoners taken by Lambert's horse, but Massey got back safely to Worcester. He was so badly wounded in his head and thigh that he could not sit on his horse without support, and could not suffer his horse go out of a walk.

== Aftermath ==
The Upton fight had been sharp while it lasted. Lambert deserved his success by the bold way he executed his orders and the tenacious grip by which he held on to Upton when once he got a foothold there. In the opinion of the historian J.W. Willis-Bund in all the Worcestershire fighting in the Civil War no braver act is recorded than that of the 18 who crossed the bridge, held the burning church against 300 Royalists, and enabled Lambert to win his victory.

It also enabled the turning movement, cutting off the Royalists from Wales and the west, to be carried out. It was also the first step towards driving in and crushing the right wing of the Royalists, enabling the encircling movement to begin, and the elaborate defences around Worcester which the Scots had taken such pains to construct to be turned.

How important Cromwell regarded it is shown by the fact that later in the day he came himself to Upton to thank Lambert's men for their courageous behaviour, and to see the best use was made of their triumph.

Cromwell ordered the bridge at once to be repaired and made passable for troops. The same day, he sent his second in command (General Charles Fleetwood) to take the command at Upton, ordering him at once to march there with a large force of troops, the whole of Colonels Lambert's and Deane's brigades.

In pursuance of these orders in the course of the next day a Parliamentary force some 12,000 strong was encamped on the west bank of the Severn. Its outposts were pushed forward to the Old Hills and nearly to Powick. Its vedettes were sent up the Teme valley to cut off all attempts the Royalists might make to communicate with Wales or the west.
