= Chris Trenfield =

English actor

Chris Trenfield is an actor from Alvechurch, currently working and studying in Surrey.

He appeared as Charlie Webster in the TV show Peak Practice during 2001. Prior to that he appeared on the Birmingham theatre scene as Gavroche in a production of Les Misérables.

Television and Film Credits include: Matthew Bourne's Sleeping Beauty (BBC/ New Adventures); Matthew Bourne's Christmas (New Adventures); Swan Lake 3D (SKY/ New Adventures); The Paul O'Grady Show (Channel 4); Charlie Preston in Peak Practice (ITV). As well as modeling in Italian Men's Vogue.

Chris Trenfield is an alumnus of Alvechurch Middle School and North Bromsgrove High School.
