= Hanley Swan =

Village in Worcestershire, England

Coordinates: 52.08351°N 2.27417°W

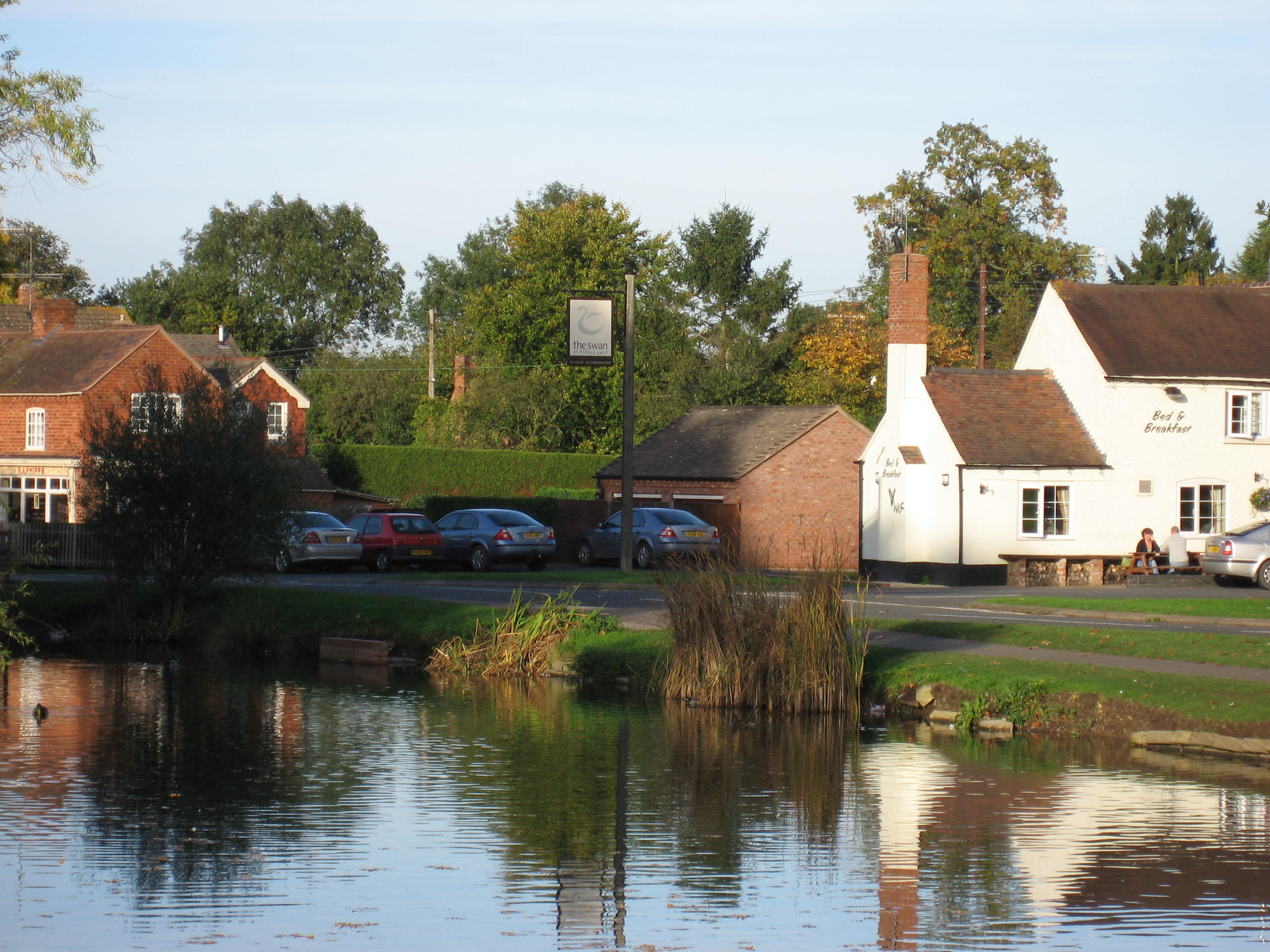
- Village green with pond and Swan Inn

- Location within Worcestershire
- OS grid reference: SO813428
  - London: 97 mi (156 km) SE
- Civil parish: Hanley Castle
- District: Malvern Hills
- Shire county: Worcestershire
- Region: West Midlands
- Country: England
- Sovereign state: United Kingdom
- Post town: WORCESTER
- Postcode district: WR8
- Police: West Mercia
- Fire: Hereford and Worcester
- Ambulance: West Midlands
- UK Parliament: West Worcestershire

Hanley Swan is a small village in the English county of Worcestershire. It lies in the Malvern Hills district, between the towns of Malvern (two miles [3.2 km] away) and Upton-upon-Severn (approximately three miles [5 km] away). Together with the nearby village of Hanley Castle, its population is about 1500. The traditional English village centre includes a village green and pond, a pub, a Social Club and a village stores. Hanley Swan won the 2009 Calor Herefordshire and Worcestershire Village of the Year competition, a heat of the national Village of the year competition. Hanley Swan was an inspiration for the setting of the novel Black Swan Green by David Mitchell.

== History ==
The Church of Our Lady and St Alphonsus was built, shortly after restrictions against Catholic churches were lifted in 1829, by descendants of Thomas Hornyold who had aided Charles II's escape. As elsewhere in Worcestershire, the continuing Catholic connections of the county meant that new Catholic churches were established with greater funding than in many other parts of the country.

== Sources ==
- Lloyd, David (1993), A History of Worcestershire, Chichester: Phillimore, ISBN 9780850336580, LCCN 94109314, OCLC 30027275, OL 1140253M
