= Hagley Roman Catholic High School =

Hagley Catholic High School

Location
- Brake Lane; Hagley, Worcs, DY8 2XL; England; 52.423485°N 2.14875°W

Information
- Type: Specialist Religious Academy
- Motto: Semper Fidelis (Always Faithful)
- Religious affiliation: Roman Catholic
- Established: 1959
- Local authority: Worcestershire
- Department for Education URN: 141414 Tables
- Ofsted: Reports
- Chair: C Guy
- Head teacher: J Hodgson
- Gender: Coeducational
- Age: 11 to 18
- Enrolment: 1033
- Houses: Anselm, Bede, Chad, Gregory, Kenelm and Wulstan
- Colours: Navy and Gold
- Alumni: Hageleians
- Website: https://www.hagleyrc.worcs.sch.uk/

Hagley Catholic High School is a coeducational school for ages 11–18 situated in the village of Hagley, Worcestershire, England. Currently a member of the Catholic Emmaus trust of schools, it was founded by the Catholic community in Worcestershire. The school holds specialist academy status, and was awarded a Grade 1 (Outstanding) in the 2011 Ofsted report. The patron saint is Catholic martyr Saint Nicholas Owen, and the school is divided into six houses named after saints: Anselm, Bede, Chad, Gregory, Kenelm, and Wulstan.

Outcomes are excellent at Hagley with a GCSE Progress 8 score in 2019 of +0.35 and English literature and language, maths, science and history in the top 20% of all schools nationally for attainment. Overall attainment was in the top 20% also, as were all elements of the attainment buckets.

The sixth form enjoys a high rate of success, with half of all candidates achieving grades AAB or higher. In 2020, 40% of sixth form leavers went on to study at Russell Group universities and the school has sent students to Oxbridge.

== History ==
The school was founded in 1959 after the Catholic community in Worcestershire first began collecting funds to build a school in 1942. Originally the school was to be built in Stourport-on-Severn, but land was later donated in Hagley.

A-Levels have been taught in the school since the 1960s, and the sixth form common room and adjacent teaching rooms were built in 1976.

In 1969, in the building which would later become Lab 5, a full-scale replica of a Bristol Scout aeroplane was built by five pupils and their history teacher. The aeroplane could only be removed when the window frames were removed.

In 2007, the school agreed to work in correspondence with Haybridge High School, located oppositely on Brake Lane. By doing so, both schools worked to expand the teaching of less commonly taken elective subjects. The schools have shared common ground for sporting events for some time and enjoy a healthy rivalry with each other.

An extensive collection of catalogued records relating to the history of the school can be found. A history of the school, written by former teacher Stephen Roberts, was published in 2009.

== Governance ==
The school heads the Emmaus Catholic MAC, a trust of several Catholic schools in the Archdiocese of Birmingham. The Board of Directors is chaired by Ms Joanna Griffin.

Each school within Emmaus is governed by a Local Governing Body (LGB). Hagley's consists of six foundation governors including the Principal, two parent governors and one staff governor. The Vice Principal sits in an advisory capacity. The Local Governing Body meets half termly. The current Chair of the LGB is Mr Chris Guy and Vice-Chair is Mr Geoff Taylor-Smith.

== Curriculum ==
The school provides a caring and challenging community splitting the curriculum into three areas called the taught curriculum, the enrichment curriculum, and the Catholic curriculum.

=== Structure ===
Whilst the school has a strong academic focus, an emphasis is placed on an all-round development of pupils, backed by a strong Catholic ethos. The sixth form offers 24 courses for students and may also elect to sit an Extended Project Qualification.

=== Extracurricular activities ===
The school maintains its own cricket field, cricket nets, tennis courts, football pitch, and indoor sports centre. The school and sixth form field competitive teams in rugby, cricket, football, gymnastics, basketball, and netball. Extracurricular activities also include annual ski trips, performing arts club, debate club, and the culture vulture club.

The sixth form has an elected committee and is led by the head boy and head girl whose names are added to the Honours Board which is located in the Dining Hall.

== Traditions ==
The school prayer is said at the start and the end of each day:

"Saint Nicholas Owen, make this school a safe refuge; inspire in us a love God and a love of our neighbour. Guide us in our work and play, that we may always be faithful to Christ, our Lord. Amen"

Mass is held for one year group of students or sixth form each Tuesday morning. Each year group will normally be able to attend one mass per term as the year group mass is offered to rotates weekly. Furthermore, the school offers the students the opportunity to take part in the mass band. This allows them to take part in the mass in more active way.

Upon entrance to the sixth form, all students are invited to a garden party hosted by the sixth form committee. On the last day of sixth form, it is customary for leavers to drink at The Station Inn pub in full school uniform, moving on to The Lyttleton Arms and then into the nearby town of Stourbridge later in the evening.

== Notable alumni ==
- Vince Bartram (b. 1968) - footballer and current goalkeeping coach at Southampton F.C.
- Claire Cashmore (b. 1988) - Team GB Paralympic gold medallist swimmer; awarded an MBE in 2017; distributed prizes at the annual presentation evening
- Stephen Roberts (1958-2022) - teacher of history and law at the school (1982-2012); author or editor of books on Victorian Britain, most of them relating to the Chartist Movement
- Lee Sharpe (b. 1971) - Footballer, Manchester United F.C.; attended Hagley 1982-1987; opened the newly constructed sports centre and distributed prizes at the annual presentation evening
- Darren Wassall (b. 1968) - footballer, head coach at Derby County
- Umberto Giannini, Award winning hairdresser

== School bus accident ==
The school suffered a tragedy on 18 November 1993 when a minibus transporting 14 pupils home from a proms concert in London collided with a maintenance lorry on the M40 motorway near Warwick. 10 pupils and 35-year-old teacher Eleanor Fry (who was driving the minibus) died at the scene, two other pupils died later in hospital from their injuries. Two other pupils, both 12-year-old girls, survived and made a full recovery from their injuries.

Several memorials were put in place in the school and local area, including a stained glass window in the entrance foyer; several charities were also formed. One of the consequences of the crash was the launch of a national campaign to improve safety and driving standards for Passenger Carrying Vehicles (PCVs). The huge number of letters which were sent to the school in the weeks after this event were placed for safekeeping in the care of Worcestershire County Archives in 2012.
