= Hanley Castle =

Village in Worcestershire, England

Coordinates: 52.079°N 2.236°W

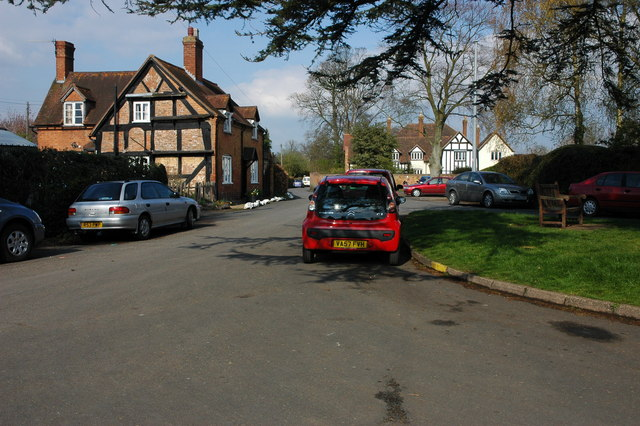

- Location within Worcestershire
- OS grid reference: SO839423
- Civil parish: Hanley Castle
- District: Malvern Hills
- Shire county: Worcestershire
- Region: West Midlands
- Country: England
- Sovereign state: United Kingdom
- Post town: Worcester
- Postcode district: WR8
- Police: West Mercia
- Fire: Hereford and Worcester
- Ambulance: West Midlands
- UK Parliament: West Worcestershire

Hanley Castle is a village and civil parish in Worcestershire, England, between the towns of Malvern and Upton upon Severn and a short distance from the River Severn. (Note: The village has also been known as Hanlie (11th century.); Hanlega, Hanlegam, and Hanlea (12th century.); and Hanlegh (13th century) (Page & Willis-Bund 1924, pp. 89–101)) It lies in the administrative area of Malvern Hills District, and is part of the informal region known as The Malverns. It is served primarily by bus service 332 Worcester - Upton upon Severn - Hanley Castle operated by Aston Coaches and 363 Worcester - Tewkesbury operated by First Worcester.

The village population together with that of the nearby village of Hanley Swan is around 1500. The central feature of the village is the cul-de-sac of Church End with its village green dominated by a huge Cedar of Lebanon tree that is reputed to be approximately 200 years old, the unspoiled 15th-century red-brick and timbered pub, other listed buildings, and the campus of Hanley Castle High School.

== History ==
The name Hanley derives from the Old English hēahlēah meaning 'high wood/clearing'.

In the 12th century, the heavily forested area became the seat of administration of the Malvern Chase, a royal hunting area. There was once a Norman castle built as a hunting lodge for King John in 1207 near the present day village. By the end of the 15th century it had been mostly demolished, and the tower was finally removed in 1795. However, a few traces still remain including a dry moat and a mound.

Hanley Castle Grammar School was founded in 1326.

During the Worcester Campaign of the Third English Civil War, a Royalist brigade under Major General Edward Massey, were quartered in Upton-upon-Severn to defend the partially demolished bridge. Massey with about 150 of his soldiers stayed in Severn End with the owner Nicolas Lechmere. On 29 August 1651, Massey was wounded in the head and the thigh during the fighting in Upton after the Parliamentarian soldiers under the command of Colonel John Lambert had forced a passage across the bridge as they advanced on Worcester.

Poor laws resulted in over 110 individuals being removed from Hanley Castle between 1717 and 1835, while a similar number were returned. This often involved the return of pregnant women. In 1830, for example, a woman was returned from Bristol after falling pregnant by a shoemaker who was married.

== Hanley Castle High School ==
The Grammar school, now a comprehensive school with a roll of about 1200 pupils is located in the centre of Hanley Castle next to the village green. For much of the 20th century, the grammar school was a day and boarding school with a staff of about 15 and around 200 boys aged 11 to 18 who were admitted by selection only after passing the eleven-plus exam. Although government owned, it was run very much on the traditional lines of a typical English 'Public School'. In 1969 following changes in government education policy, the school developed more in the style of a comprehensive school with a focus on both academic and vocational education. The school serves not only Hanley Castle village itself, but also the nearby town of Upton upon Severn, and other local villages including Hanley Swan, Welland and Castlemorton and is one of three state secondary schools for Malvern children. In 2009, the school received an exceptionally good OFSTED report. In 2011 the school became an academy.

== Severn End ==
Severn End is a large Elizabethan and Jacobean mansion at the seat of the Lechmere baronets in Hanley Castle since the 11th century. The Grade II listed building is situated on the banks of the River Severn, and is reached from a large gatehouse by a long private road through the estate.

== The Three Kings inn ==
Records from the 17th century of the village inn at Church End show the property as owned by the three King brothers who sold it to the Lechmere family in 1710. The inn has been run by its tenants, the Roberts family, since 1911. In 1993, the inn received the first prize of CAMRA National Pub of the Year award, and was runner up for the prize in 1998.

== Literature ==
In the 1880s W.S. Symonds wrote a historical romance called Hanley Castle, which was set during the English Civil War (mid-17th century):

...After this, Hanley Castle became a favourite residence of the Beauchamps. Here Isabel Despenser, herself of royal blood, presented her first husband, Richard Beauchamp, with a daughter, when Henry the Fifth was king (1415). At Hanley Castle she married her second husband, that famous Earl of Warwick who took the standard of Owen Glendower on Shrewsbury battle-field, and who was afterwards guardian of Henry the Sixth and Regent of France. He lies beneath his grand monument at Warwick, she lies by the chapel built to the memory of her first husband in the ancient Abbey of Tewkesbury. At Hanley Castle died their son, who was made Duke of Warwick by Henry the Sixth, and here lived for years his sister Anne, who married Neville the "King-maker" "the great commanding Warwick," "the setter-up and plucker-down of kings." Henry the Seventh appropriated the property of the Beauchamps, and in the days of James the First the Castle of Hanley belonged to the Crown, but was well nigh deserted and neglected. From its situation it could be easily destroyed by cannon, and even the great central Keep must have succumbed in a short time to artillery acting from the broad leys which commanded the Castle from the eastward. Nevertheless it was a place the hunters still loved to visit, and King James often declared that he would himself hunt a stag from his Castle of Hanley in Malvern Chase. He never came, however, and it was rented from the Crown by my father, Miles Forester, who loved the locality on account of its connection with my mother's ancestors, and for its sylvan beauty, its great moat filled with fishes, its keep in which we lived, the shattered turrets which formed the angles, and the connecting galleries now overgrown with ivy and polypody, tower cress, and pennywort.

— W. S. Symonds (1883).

Between 1915 and his death in 1975, P.G. Wodehouse based several stories in the area. Severn End, the stately home of the Lechmere family, may have been the inspiration for Brinkley Court, the country seat for Bertie Wooster's Aunt Dahlia. In addition, the then Hanley Castle Grammar School was the model for Market Snodsbury Grammar School, with at least one of the stories mentioning the School Hall, now the School Library, in detail.
