= Wyre Forest School =

Coordinates: 52.378704°N 2.22508°W

- Wyre Forest logo.

Location
- Habberley Road; Kidderminster,, Worcestershire,, DY11 6FA; England

Information
- Type: Community special school
- Established: 1960 (as Stourminster); 2011 (as Wyre Forest)
- Local authority: Worcestershire County Council
- Department for Education URN: 135791 Tables
- Ofsted: Reports
- Chair of Governors: Fran Oborski
- Headteacher: Rebecca Garratt
- Gender: Mixed
- Age: 7 to 16
- Enrolment: 121

Wyre Forest School (formerly Stourminster Special School) is a school in Kidderminster, Worcestershire, for students with complex special needs, and about one fifth of the students are on the autistic spectrum continuum. It caters for ages 7 to 16 and has about 120 mixed gender students on roll. The school has a very wide catchment area and students come from varied social backgrounds.

The school was established on 1 September 2011, following a merger of Stourminster Special School and Blakebrook Special School and will continue to operate from existing premises until new accommodation has been built in the Habberley Learning Village that houses Baxter College and St. John's CE Primary School.

An April 2007 Ofsted report accorded the school a Grade 2 (Good).
