= Alvechurch Church of England Middle School =

Location
- Redditch Road; Alvechurch, Worcestershire, B48 7TA; England; 52.3560°N 1.9623°W

Information
- Type: Academy
- Religious affiliation: Church of England
- Established: 1970
- Local authority: Worcestershire
- Department for Education URN: 143507 Tables
- Ofsted: Reports
- Chair of Governors: Bryan Maybee
- Staff: 24 teaching, 26 support
- Gender: Coeducational
- Age: 9 to 13
- Enrolment: c.360
- Houses: Dewyche, Hollington, Wattes, Tonyn
- Website: http://www.alvechurch.worcs.sch.uk/

Alvechurch Church of England Middle School (formerly 'Alvechurch Church of England Primary School') is a coeducational Church of England middle school located in the village of Alvechurch in Worcestershire, England. As of 2020 it had around 430 pupils from ages 9 to 13.

Pupils from Alvechurch Middle School tend to feed into either South Bromsgrove High School or North Bromsgrove High School.

Previously a voluntary controlled school administered by Worcestershire County Council, in April 2017 Alvechurch Church of England Middle School converted to academy status.

The school is part of the same building as the Alvechurch Public Library.

== Academic standards ==
By January 2004 the school provided for 39 per cent more pupils than it did in January 1998. Most pupils come from socially advantaged backgrounds. Following their inspection in January July 2008, the Ofsted inspectors concluded their report with an overall Overall: Grade 2 (out of 4): 'Good' with several outstanding features (Grade 1).

== Awards ==
- In 2004 the school was given the DfES Achievement Award for its academic performance in 2002.
- In 2007 the school attained the Artsmark Gold award from the Arts Council.
- The school has been awarded the Eco School Award for being an Eco friendly school.

== Sport and community activities ==
In 2004-05 five pupils from the school underwent training in bellringing at St Laurence Church to help out with a shortage of bellringers.

In July 2006 in the Bromsgrove and Droitwich District Track Championships, Alvechurch girls came second in the year five events and the boys also came second in the year six section.

On 24 March 2007 Alvechurch came second in both the years 5/6 and 7/8 categories at the Herefordshire and Worcestershire Schools Orienteering Championship.

== Notable alumni ==
- Sir Digby Jones, former Director General of the CBI
- Chris Trentfield, former Peak Practice star
- Poppy O'Toole, chef
