= Baxter College =

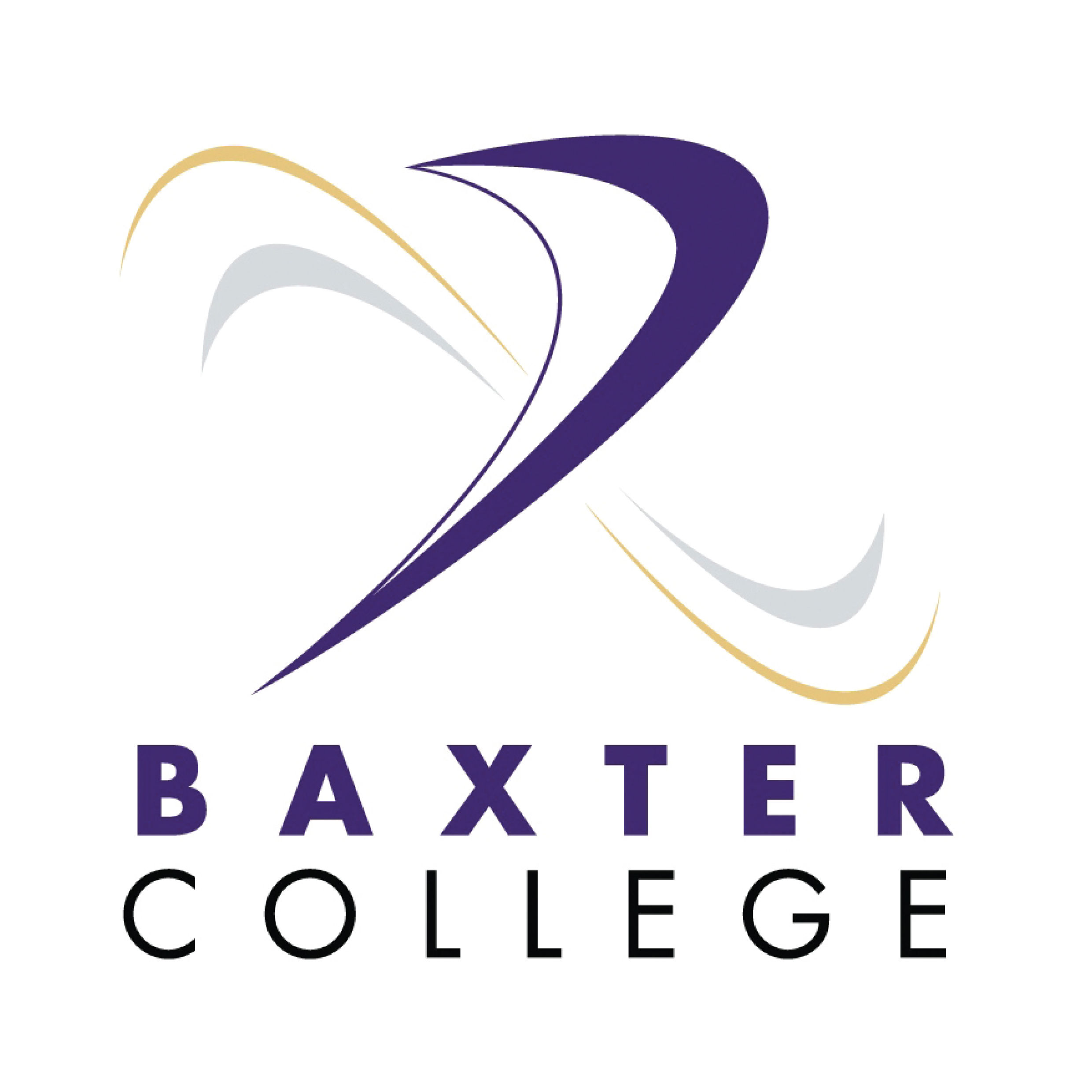

Location
- Habberley Road; Kidderminster, Worcestershire, DY11 5PQ; England; 52°23′19″N 2°16′15″W

Information
- Type: Academy
- Motto: Achieving Together
- Local authority: Worcestershire County Council
- Department for Education URN: 144367 Tables
- Chair: Sarah Beadsworth
- Principal: Matthew Carpenter
- Staff: Approx. 150
- Gender: Mixed
- Age: 11 to 18
- Enrolment: Approx. 1000
- Colours: Purple and Black
- Website: https://www.baxtercollege.co.uk/

Baxter College is a mixed secondary school with academy status located in Kidderminster, Worcestershire, England. Prior to September 2002 the school was known as Harry Cheshire High School. The school provides education for pupils aged 11 to 18 years, and offers a wide range of courses at GCSE and A-Level.

== History ==
The school was previously known as Harry Cheshire High School. Due to a lack of good exam results and absence levels of up to 15% the school was placed under special measures by the Office for Standards in Education. In September 2002 it then became Baxter College. Its results have greatly improved, and it has attained specialist status as a Business and Enterprise College.

The school has been paired with Stourport High School in a Leading Edge Partnership to assist in the improvement of the school.

== Notable alumni ==
- Justin Tomlinson, Member of Parliament for North Swindon
- George Connolly, Youngest ever Mayor of Kidderminster
