= Eldersfield =

Village in Worcestershire, England

Coordinates: 51.978635°N 2.291944°W

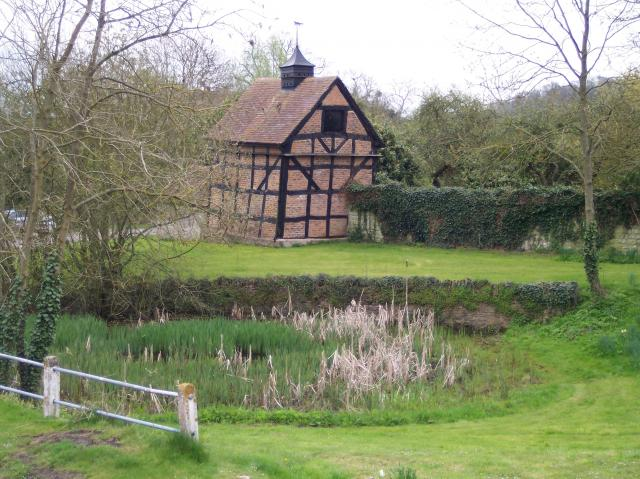
- Village pond

- Location within Worcestershire
- Population: 584
- District: Malvern Hills
- Shire county: Worcestershire
- Region: West Midlands
- Country: England
- Sovereign state: United Kingdom
- Post town: Gloucester
- Postcode district: GL19
- Police: West Mercia
- Fire: Hereford and Worcester
- Ambulance: West Midlands
- UK Parliament: West Worcestershire

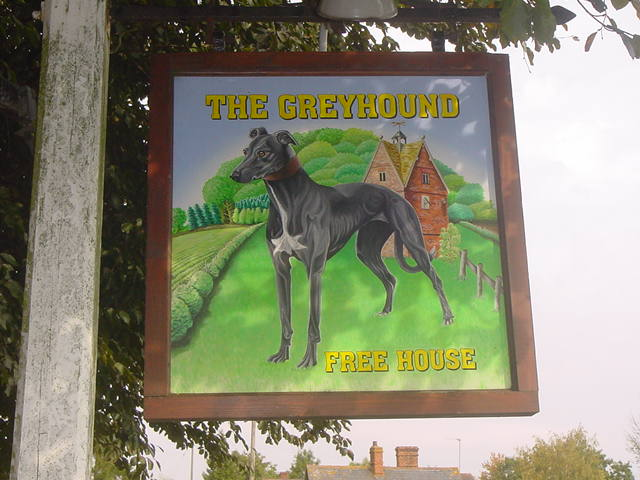
The sign that hangs in front of the Greyhound pub by local artist Kate Sanger-Davies

Eldersfield is a village and civil parish in the Malvern Hills district of Worcestershire, England. It had a population of 584 in 2021.

It stands exactly ten miles east of Ledbury and ten miles north of Gloucester; a fact marked by a milestone on the side of the B4211 road that runs through Corse Lawn.

== History ==
=== Name ===
The name Eldersfield derives from the Old English hyldresfeld meaning 'elder tree field', or possibly from Ealdheresfeld meaning 'Ealdhere's field'.

=== Gadbury Camp ===
The Iron Age fort of Gadbury Camp is located in the parish, east of the village, on a hill overlooking the river valleys of the Leadon and Severn. It was surrounded by a single massive rampart, making it a rare "univallate" construction. The camp area is 10 acres, is 100m wide at its widest point and has 400m of ramparts. It was occupied from the fourth century BC to early centuries AD and likely served as a site for redistributing subsistence and craft goods. Finds at the site include an Iron Age statue and Roman coins.

It is now a listed monument.

=== Parish Church ===
The parish church is dedicated to St. John the Baptist and is in the Diocese of Worcester. The parish registers survive from 1718, and there are bishops' transcripts for the earlier registers starting in 1561.

In 1619, the vicar of Eldersfield Gerard Prior preached against the use of Sunday's for leisure and games, under the Declaration of Sports, asking that "the King's heart might be turned from profanenes, vanity and popery". He was suspended, but later reinstated.

The Savage family were the local worthies and numerous of their 17th-century tombs in the church and graves in the churchyard were recorded by Treadway Russell Nash c1780, including Christopher Savage gent. (1600-1681).

=== Enclosure of Commons ===
Acts for enclosing lands were passed in 1836, 1840 and 1861.
