= The Stourport High School and Sixth Form Centre =

The Stourport High School & VIth Form Centre

Location
- Minster Road; Stourport-on-Severn, Worcestershire, DY13 8AX; England
- Coordinates: 52°20′58″N 2°16′32″W

Information
- Type: Academy
- Motto: Carpe Diem
- Established: 1956
- Local authority: Worcestershire County Council
- Department for Education URN: 137162 Tables
- Ofsted: Reports
- Principal: Sara Peace
- CEO: Chris King
- Gender: Mixed
- Age: 11 to 18
- Enrolment: 1300
- MAT: Severn Academies Educational Trust
- Website: http://www.shs.worcs.sch.uk/

The Stourport High School & Sixth Form Centre, formerly known as the Stourport High School and Language College, opened to students in 1956 as an 11-18 school. The starting age was increased to 13 during the 1970s, but reverted to 11 in 2007 as part of the Wyre Forest Review. The school is located in the town of Stourport-on-Severn in Worcestershire, England. It was built to replace the Stourport Secondary Modern School, which was formerly Lickhill Middle.

== Present Day ==
In October 2018, Ofsted judged the school as 'Requires Improvement' in all areas on their 4-point scale, after inspectors found standards had 'declined considerably' since the school was rated outstanding in 2012.

The school became an Academy in 2012.
