= Upton upon Severn =

Town in Worcestershire, England

Coordinates: 52.063°N 2.215°W

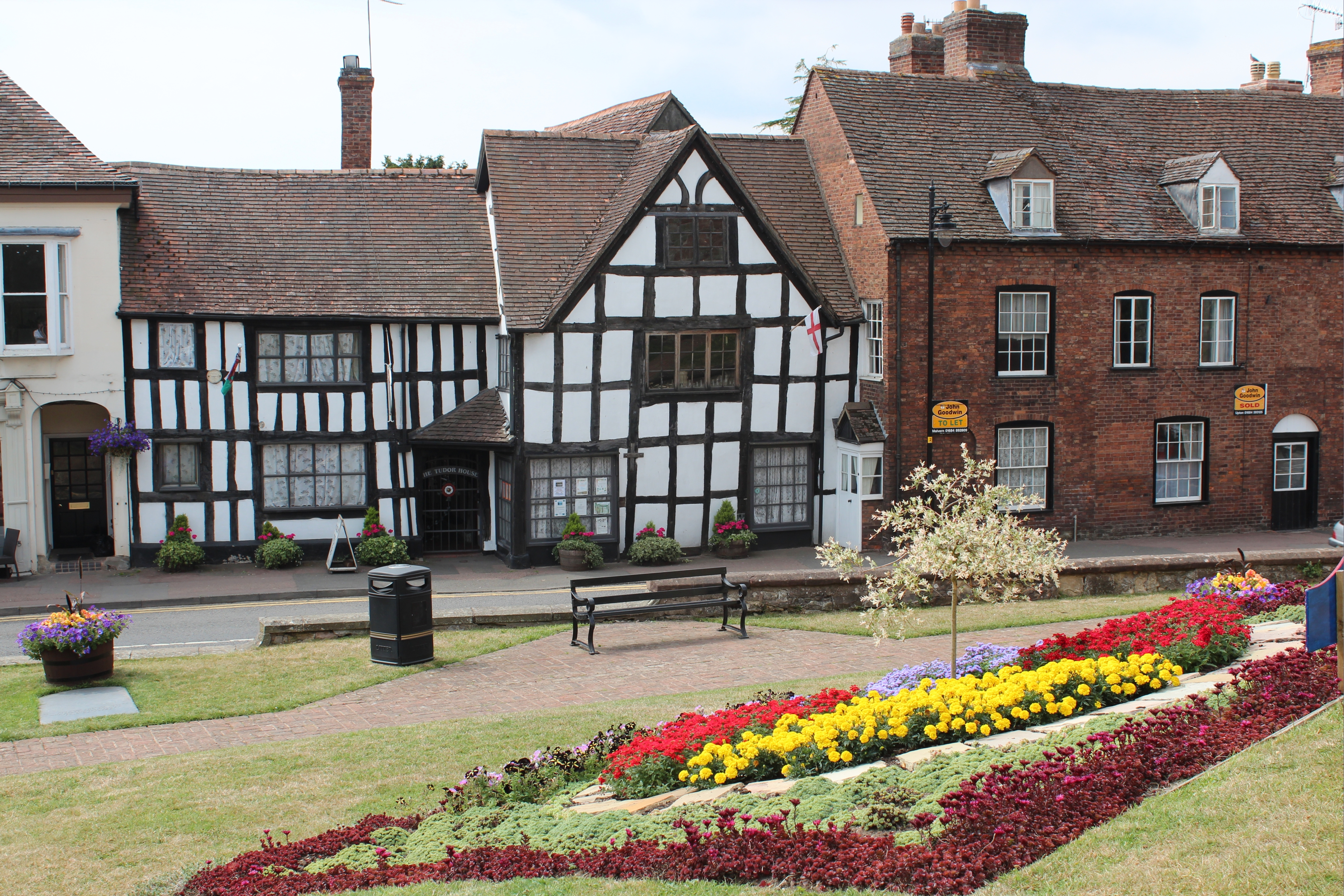

- Location within Worcestershire
- Population: 2,903 (2021)
- OS grid reference: SO852405
  - London: 114 miles (183 km)
- Civil parish: Upton-upon-Severn
- District: Malvern Hills
- Shire county: Worcestershire
- Region: West Midlands
- Country: England
- Sovereign state: United Kingdom
- Post town: Worcester
- Postcode district: WR8
- Dialling code: 01684
- Police: West Mercia
- Fire: Hereford and Worcester
- Ambulance: West Midlands
- UK Parliament: West Worcestershire

Upton upon Severn (or locally simply Upton) is a riverside town and civil parish in the Malvern Hills District of Worcestershire, England. Lying on the A4104 (formerly A440), the town recorded a population of 2,903 in the 2021 census.

Upton is situated on the west bank of the River Severn and is located 5 miles (8 km) southeast of Malvern. The town has a distinctive tower and copper-clad cupola — known locally as the "Pepperpot" — the only surviving remnant of the former church. The church's replacement, also dedicated to St Peter and St Paul, was designed by Sir Arthur Blomfield.

== History ==
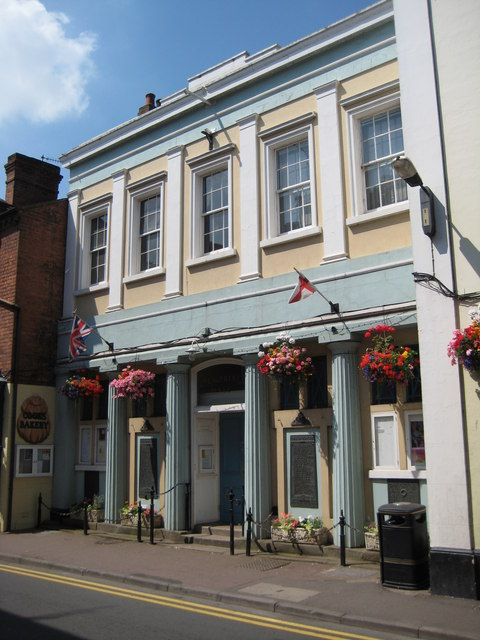
Upton upon Severn Memorial Hall

The name Upton derives from the Old English upptūn meaning "settlement higher up", in reference to its position upstream from Ripple.

Until the later half of the 20th century, the bridge at Upton was the only one across the River Severn between Worcester and Tewkesbury; the present bridge was built in 1940. Oliver Cromwell's soldiers crossed the Severn here to win the Battle of Upton before the main Battle of Worcester in the English Civil War. The Upton upon Severn Memorial Hall was completed in 1832.

== Name variants ==
Although the style Upton upon Severn is now used by most local organisations, and local, regional and national government, the Royal Mail styles addresses as Upton-upon-Severn, and the civil parish's name also uses hyphens. This style is adopted by some businesses. Upton-on-Severn was most usual for most of the 19th and part of the 20th century; the now-defunct railway station carried that name. A variant with a capitalised Upon can also be found.

== Upton in the 21st century ==
The population of the civil parish in 2021 was recorded at 2,903, an increase from 2,881 in 2011. The parish extends westward from the town, including the settlement at Tunnel Hill, but does not include the village of Ryall located close to the town, on the other side of the river. Upton is in the West Worcestershire parliamentary constituency.

The town has three major music festivals, with the spring folk festival, the summer jazz and blues festivals.

Upton is the location of a 16th-century coaching inn, The White Lion Hotel, in which parts of the building date back to 1510. The building, which has a distinctive portico adorned with its very own lion, has undergone many transformations over the centuries. It is reputed to have played a part in the English Civil War, where soldiers from both sides are alleged to have enjoyed the hospitality of this popular local hostelry prior to the Battle of Worcester. Guests of the hotel can stay in rooms referred to in books VII and VIII of Henry Fielding's classic 1749 novel Tom Jones in which he refers to the hotel as "A house of exceeding good repute"; these rooms retain many of their original features.

== Flooding ==
Known for its regular flooding, Upton lies on the banks of the River Severn and is one of the most frequently flooded towns in England and was the subject of a 2024 risk assessment paper by the University of Manchester. Low-lying areas of Upton suffered serious flooding in 1947 and 2000 but are regularly flooded most years during the spring and early summer. In the 2007 floods, levels exceeded those in 2000, and the town was inaccessible by road. The town's main built-up area lies on slightly higher ground than the surrounding countryside, and in the past became an island during severe floods. A connecting causeway now carries the A4104 above the floods to the west, and a viaduct on the other side of the bridge to the east.

== Education ==
Primary education is provided by Upton Upon Severn CofE Primary School with approximately 175 (in 2025) pupils on its roll. Hanley Castle High School, located in a nearby village, provides secondary education for the region and is one of the three large high schools serving the Malvern area.

== People ==
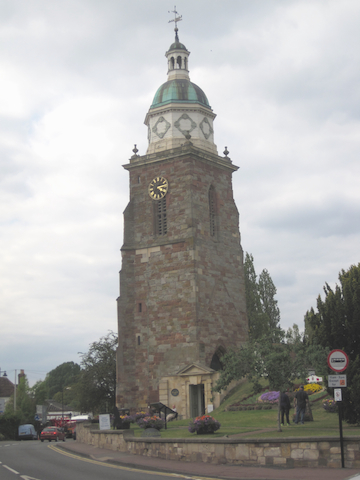
The "Pepperpot" – remains of the former church of St Peter and St Paul. Its nave was demolished in 1937.

- John Dee, mathematician, astronomer and astrologer, was presented the lay rectorship of Upton upon Severn in 1553.
- Nigel Mansell, 1992 Formula One world champion, born at Baughton near Upton.
- Admiral Sir William Tennant (1890–1963), born in Upton.
- General Sir George Alexander Weir (1876–1951), born in Upton.

== Transport ==
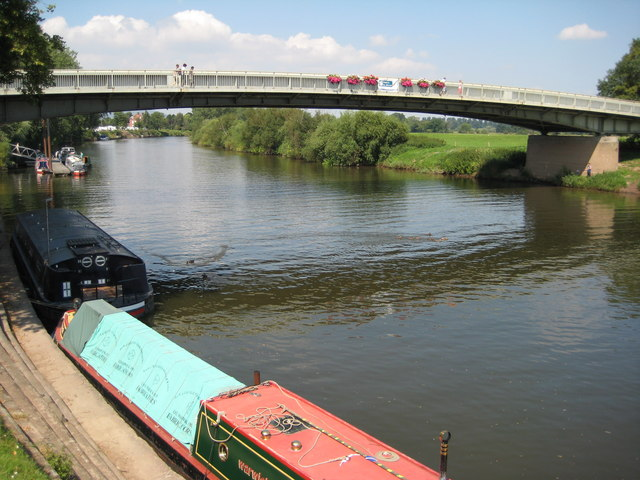
The bridge at Upton upon Severn

Upton was served by Upton-on-Severn railway station, on a branch line Tewkesbury and Malvern Railway from Ashchurch to Malvern, with the intermediate stations Tewkesbury, Ripple, Worcestershire, Upton upon Severn and Malvern Wells (Hanley Road). The Upton to Malvern section closed in December 1952 and the rest in August 1961, before the Beeching Axe.

Bus services 332 and 363 link Upton to Worcester a total of six times per day (Mon–Fri), with four per day on Saturdays.

Although the M5 motorway is close by, the nearest motorway junction is Junction 1 of the M50 (which is 2 miles or 3.2 km from J8 of the M5).

Upton Marina is home to Mercia Inshore Search and Rescue.
