= Stoke =

Stoke most commonly refers to:

- Stoke-on-Trent, city in Staffordshire, UK
  - Stoke City F.C., an association football club based in Stoke-on-Trent

Stoke may also refer to:

== Places ==
=== Canada ===
- Stoke, Quebec

=== New Zealand ===
- Stoke, New Zealand

=== United Kingdom ===
==== Berkshire ====
- Stoke Row

==== Bristol ====
- Stoke Bishop
- Stoke Gifford
- Bradley Stoke
- Little Stoke
- Harry Stoke
- Stoke Lodge

==== Buckinghamshire ====
- Stoke Hammond
- Stoke Mandeville
- Stoke Poges

==== Cheshire ====
- Stoke, Cheshire East
- Stoke, Cheshire West and Chester, a civil parish

==== Cornwall ====
- Stoke Climsland

==== Devon ====
- Stoke, Plymouth
- Stoke, Devon, near Hartland
- Stoke Canon
- Stoke Fleming
- Stoke Gabriel
- Stoke Rivers

==== Dorset ====
- Stoke Abbott
- Stoke Wake

==== Gloucestershire ====
- Stoke Orchard

==== Hampshire ====
- Stoke, Basingstoke and Deane
- Stoke, Hayling Island
- Stoke Charity

==== Herefordshire ====
- Stoke Bliss
- Stoke Edith
- Stoke Lacy
- Stoke Prior, Herefordshire

==== Kent ====
- Stoke, Kent

==== Leicestershire ====
- Stoke Golding

==== Lincolnshire ====
- Stoke Rochford

==== London ====
- Stoke Newington

==== Milton Keynes ====
- Stoke Goldington

==== Norfolk ====
- Stoke Ash
- Stoke Ferry
- Stoke Holy Cross

==== Northamptonshire ====
- Stoke Bruerne
- Stoke Doyle

==== Nottinghamshire ====
- Stoke Bardolph

==== Oxfordshire ====
- Stoke Lyne
- Stoke Row
- Stoke Talmage

==== Rutland ====
- Stoke Dry

==== Shropshire ====
- Stoke on Tern
- Stoke St. Milborough

==== Somerset ====
- Stoke Pero
- Stoke St Gregory
- Stoke St Mary
- Stoke St Michael
- Stoke-sub-Hamdon
- Stoke Trister

==== Staffordshire ====
- Stoke-upon-Trent, a town in the city of Stoke-on-Trent

==== Suffolk ====
- Stoke, Suffolk (a suburb of Ipswich)
- Stoke Ash
- Stoke-by-Clare
- Stoke-by-Nayland

==== Surrey ====
- Stoke d'Abernon
- Stoke next Guildford

==== West Midlands ====
- Stoke, Coventry
- Stoke Aldermoor, a suburb of Coventry, West Midlands (also nearby Stoke and Stoke Park)

==== West Sussex ====
- West Stoke

==== Worcestershire ====
- Stoke, Worcestershire, a civil parish
  - Stoke Heath, Worcestershire
  - Stoke Prior, Worcestershire
- Stoke Pound, a place in Worcestershire

=== United States ===
- Stoke (Loudoun County, Virginia), a historic farm property

== Facilities and structures ==
- Stoke Bridge, over River Gipping, in Ipswich, England, UK
- Stoke Tunnel (disambiguation)
- Stoke railway station (disambiguation)
- Stoke Bank, a railway incline on the East Coast Main Line, England, UK
- Stoke EfW, an incinerator in Sideway, Stoke-on-Trent, England, UK

== People and characters ==
- John Stoke (disambiguation)
- Melis Stoke (1235–1305), Dutch writer
- Lou Stoke, a character on the ITV show Bad Girls

== Other uses ==
- Stoke College, Stoke-by-Clare, Suffolk, England, UK
- Battle of Stoke Field (1487), in England; War of the Roses
- Stoke IPA and other beers, made by McCashin's Brewery, Nelson, New Zealand
- Stoke Space, an American space launch company.

== See also ==
- Stokes (disambiguation), (in particular, stoke is an erroneous singular of stokes (sing. and pl), a unit of kinematic viscosity)
- Stoked (disambiguation)
- Stoker (disambiguation)
- Stoke City (disambiguation)
- Stoke Hall (disambiguation)
- Stoke Heath (disambiguation)
- Stoke Park (disambiguation)
- Stoke Prior (disambiguation)
- Stoke-on-Trent (disambiguation)
- Old Stoke (disambiguation)
- North Stoke (disambiguation)
- East Stoke (disambiguation)
- South Stoke (disambiguation)
- West Stoke
