= Geoffrey the Baker =

English historian and writer

Geoffrey the Baker (died c. 1360), also called Walter of Swinbroke, was an English chronicler. He was probably a secular clerk at Swinbrook in Oxfordshire.

He wrote a Chronicon Angliae temporibus Edwardi II et Edwardi III, which deals with the history of England from 1303 to 1356. From the beginning until about 1324 this work is based upon Adam Murimuth's Continuatio chronicarum, but after this date it contains information not found elsewhere, and closes with a detailed account of the Battle of Poitiers. The author obtained his knowledge about the last days of Edward II from William Bisschop, a companion of the king's alleged murderers, Thomas Gurney, William Ockley and John Maltravers.

Geoffrey also wrote a Chroniculum from the creation of the world until 1336. His writings have been edited with notes by Sir Edward Maunde Thompson as the Chronicon Galfridi le Baker de Swynebroke (Oxford, 1889). Some doubt exists concerning Geoffrey's share in the compilation of the Vita et mors Edwardi II, usually attributed to Sir Thomas de la More, or Moor, and printed by William Camden in his Anglica scripta.

It has been maintained by Camden and others that More wrote an account of Edward's reign in French, and that this was translated into Latin by Geoffrey and used by him in compiling his Chronicon. Nineteenth-century scholarship, however, asserts that More was no writer, and that the Vita et mors is an extract from Geoffrey's Chronicon, and was attributed to More, who was the author's patron. In the main this conclusion substantiates the verdict of William Stubbs, who has published the Vita et mors in his Chronicles of the reigns of Edward I and Edward II (London, 1883). The manuscripts of Geoffrey's works are in the Bodleian Library at Oxford.
