= Thomas Gurney =

Thomas Gurney may refer to:

- Thomas Gurney (knight), alleged murderer of Edward II
- Thomas Gurney (shorthand writer) (1705–1770), English shorthand-writer
- Thomas Gurney (MP) for Dartmouth (UK Parliament constituency)
