= Ockley (disambiguation) =

Ockley is a village in Surrey, England.

Ockley may also refer to:

- Ockley, Indiana, a town in Indiana, United States
- Ockley railway station, Surrey, England

== People with the surname ==
- Simon Ockley (1678–1720), British academic
- William Ockley, alleged murderer of Edward II
