= Patrick Seager Hill =

Patrick Seager Hill, T.D. (16 January 1915 – 17 December 2010) was a British clothing manufacturer, who was a pioneer and developer of safety and fire protective clothing.

== Early life and military service ==
Hill was born on 16 January 1915 in Bristol, England to clothing manufacturer William John Hill and Nora Kathleen Gough of Clifton, Bristol. His uncle was noted Dallas Texas architect Bertram Charles Hill. Another uncle Stanley Frederick Hill was awarded the Military Cross & Bar in WWI. Patrick upon completion of his education at Clifton College in Bristol, served with the Honourable Artillery Company in London, and received a commission in 1934 in the Territorial Army. He also served in the Royal Horse Artillery. He was reassigned during the Second World War to the Field Artillery, and after receiving a promotion in 1942 to the rank of major, he was stationed in Basra, Iraq. He then volunteered for the Raiding Support Regiment (RSR), and was given command in 1943 of an RSR unit stationed in Albania. There he was part of a commando force that liberated the port of Sarandë (Surandi) on the Albanian Coast. He was awarded the Territorial Decoration for his bravery and leadership in the war.

== Business career ==
When Hill completed his military service in 1946, he joined the family clothing business of Wathen Gardiner & Co, being promoted in 1954 to a senior partner in the firm. He then founded Bristol Uniforms in 1964 as a subsidiary to Wathen Gardiner, and became managing director of Bristol Uniforms the following year, when it was registered in the United Kingdom as a limited company. Bristol Uniforms under his guidance pioneered the development of modern-day safety and fire protective clothing, and he was instrumental in particular in the design and development of the fire proximity suit, which was made for organizations such as the Royal Air Force, offshore oil industry and the Fire Brigade. Although the company initially traded as Wathen Gardiner & Co. / Bristol Uniforms, today it trades solely as Bristol Uniforms. The Bristol Uniforms brand was soon recognized as one of the foremost manufacturers of fire protective clothing in the world, and remains so today.

== Community involvement and final years ==
Hill in addition to his corporate responsibilities served several times in the 1960s as chairman of the Clothing Federation, and he was president in 1977 of the Anchor Society, a charitable organization in Bristol. He was also a member of the Special Forces Club, & the Royal Lymington Yacht Club. He retired in 1989 to "Stone Cross", his residence in North Stoke, near Bath to spend his final years. He died on 17 December 2010 at Stone Cross, and is interred at St. Martin's Church in North Stoke.
