= Kathleen O'Melia =

Canadian religious sister (1869–1939)

Sister Kathleen O'Melia
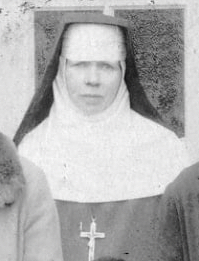
- O'Melia c. 1930

Personal life
- Born: 28 December 1869 Walpole, Norfolk, England
- Died: 5 September 1939 (aged 69) Vancouver, British Columbia, Canada
- Other names: Sister Mary of the Angels; Sister Mary Stella; O'Melia-san

Religious life
- Religion: Christianity
- Denomination: Anglo-Catholicism
- Order: Third Order of Saint Francis
- Institute: Franciscan Sisters of the Atonement
- Church: Church of England (until 1912); Catholic Church (1912 onwards)

Kathleen Fanny O'Melia (28 December 1869 – 5 September 1939), also known as Sister Mary of the Angels, Sister Mary Stella, and O'Melia-san, was an English-born teacher, social worker, and lay missionary for the Church of England and the Catholic Church in Vancouver, British Columbia, Canada.

O'Melia was born on 28 December 1869 in Walpole, Norfolk, England. She was raised in North Stoke, Somerset, where her father was rector of the parish church. In 1902, after both her parents had died, O'Melia joined the St. James Parish of the Church of England in Vancouver. She taught English to Japanese Canadian immigrants in Little Tokyo—where she eventually came to be known as O'Melia-san—simultaneously learning Japanese herself. O'Melia also organized sewing classes and day care for children, as well as community events to celebrate Japanese holidays, such as the emperor's birthday, and a Christmas party.

By 1911, O'Melia had raised funds to purchase a mission building to build in Little Tokyo. That same year, Japanese converts had collected money to hire a Japanese priest. The diocese, however, sought the appointment of an "English priest who can speak Japanese". O'Melia disagreed with the diocese's treatment of the Japanese converts. She also feared that the Church of England would seek to place a low church Englishman in charge of the mission, rather than someone with Anglo-Catholic leanings like her. In her autobiography, O'Melia wrote that she had been attracted to the "unity and doctrinal strength" of the Catholic Church. Thus, she asked Neil McNeil, the Catholic Archbishop of Vancouver, for permission to convert, which was granted. A significant group of Japanese converts joined her. Their departure caused "[t]he Anglican mission [to be] reduced to a small store front operation"; in the late 1910s, it "existed 'in name only'". The historian Jacqueline Gresko wrote that O'Melia's "move was such an 'embarrassment' that few references to it 'exist in primary source documents'".

In December 1912, O'Melia returned to Little Tokyo, where she began to form a mission for the Catholic Church. She eventually joined the Third Order of Saint Francis, and in 1914 made her vows as a religious sister, choosing the name Sister Mary of the Angels. In 1926, O'Melia entered the novitiate at the Franciscan Sisters of the Atonement in Garrison, New York, taking the new name Sister Mary Stella. In 1928, she again returned to the Vancouver mission, where she helped to form a kindergarten and health clinic. She took her vow as a Sister of the Atonement in 1934. She died on 5 September 1939, aged 69, in Vancouver. O'Melia was buried in the "East Asian" section of Mountain View Cemetery, amongst members of the Japanese Canadian community.

== Sources ==
- Gresko, Jacqueline (2009). "O'Melia San and the Catholic Japanese Mission, Vancouver, B.C." (PDF). Historical Studies. 75. Canadian Catholic Historical Association: 83–99 – via EBSCOhost.
- Gresko, Jacqueline (2022). "O'Melia, Kathleen Fanny". Dictionary of Canadian Biography. Vol. 16. Archived from the original on 16 March 2025.
- Knowles, Norman (1996). "A Selective Dependence: Vancouver's Japanese Community and Church of England Missions, 1903–1942". Journal of the Canadian Church Historical Society. 38 (1): 53–76 – via America: History and Life with Full Text.
- Okawa, Eiji (n.d.). Grunow, Tristan R.; Kato, Naoko (eds.). "Associational Lives of Women in the Prewar Japanese-Canadian Community". Meiji at 150 Digital Teaching Resource. University of British Columbia. Archived from the original on 22 June 2025.
- Roy, Patricia E. (2017). "An Ambiguous Relationship: Anglicans and the Japanese in British Columbia, 1902–1949". BC Studies (192): 105–124. doi:10.14288/bcs.v0i192.187913.
