= Richard Phené Spiers =

Richard Phené Spiers FSA FRIBA (19 May 1838 – 3 October 1916 London) was an English architect and author. He occupied a unique position amongst the English architects of the latter half of the 19th century, his long mastership of the architectural school at the Royal Academy of Arts having given him the opportunity of moulding and shaping the minds of more than a generation of students. Spiers wrote most of the articles dealing with architecture for the 1911 Encyclopædia Britannica.

== Biography ==
Phené Spiers was educated in the engineering department of King's College London, and proceeded thence to the atelier of Charles-Auguste Questel at the École nationale supérieure des Beaux-Arts, Paris, for upwards of three years, a method of study rare for an architectural student in those days. On his return, he won the gold medal and travelling scholarship of the Royal Academy, and in 1865 the Soane medal of the R.I.B.A.

In 1871, after he had worked in the offices of Sir Digby Wyatt and William Burges, he gained second premium with a spirited design (showing a good deal of the Neo-Grec feeling consequent on his French training) for the new Criterion Theatre, London, and in the same year he submitted a design in a competition for Holloway Sanatorium. His work of about this period included Lord Monkswell's house, Chelsea, and the home of John Corbett, which is now known as Chateau Impney in Droitwich Spa. Phene Spiers travelled in France, Spain, Egypt, Syria, and the East, and besides his record of more purely architectural data, he made many water-colour sketches showing much talent and facility. He was a frequent exhibitor at various galleries, and a good specimen of his art — the loggia at Hampton Court — is in the Victoria and Albert museum.

His works include a new edition of James Fergusson's History of Architecture and the further volumes on Indian and Eastern art; Architectural Drawing; The Architecture of Greece and Rome (jointly with W. J. Anderson); The Mosque at Damascus; and the articles on Persian and Roman architecture in Dr. Russell Sturgis's Dictionary of Architecture, besides an edition of Pugin's Normandy. The position to which his erudition and ability entitled him was fully recognized in other countries as well as his own, as is shown by his election to membership of many foreign societies in France, Spain, and America.

== Selected publications ==
- Spiers, Richard Phené (1892). Architectural Drawing.
- "The Great Mosque of Damascus" (PDF). Palestine Exploration Quarterly. 29 (4): 282–299. 1897. doi:10.1179/peq.1897.29.4.282.
- Architecture East and West. For the committee of theSpiers testimonial by B.T. Batsford. 1905.
- with William J. Anderson: The Architecture of Greece & Rome (2nd ed.). 1907. (1st edition, 1902)
