= Stokey =

Stokey is a surname. Notable people with the surname include:

- Mike Stokey (1918–2003), American game show host and producer
- Nancy Stokey (born 1950), American economist

== See also ==
- Stoke Newington
- Stoker (surname)
