= Stoke Church =

Stoke Church may refer to:

- Stoke Minster
- St Nectan's Church, Hartland
- Other churches in places called Stoke
