= Sister Mary =

Sister Mary may refer to:

== Arts ==
- Sister Mary (album), album by Irish singer Joe Dolan
  - "Sister Mary" (song), title track of above album
- Sister Mary (film), 2011 American comedy musical film directed and written by Scott Grenke

== People known as Sister Mary ==
- Sister Mary Ignatius Davies (1921−2003), Jamaican nun
- Sister Mary Celine Fasenmyer (1906–1996), American nun and mathematician
- Sister Mary Laurence (1929–2024), New Zealand nun
- Sister Mary Leo (1895–1989), New Zealand nun
- Sister Mary Irene FitzGibbon (1823–1896), England-born American nun
- Sister Mary Melanie Holliday (1850–1939), American nun
- Kathleen O'Melia (1869–1939), English-born Canadian sister known as Sister Mary Stella and Sister Mary of the Angels

== See also ==
- Sister Mary Ignatius Explains It All for You, 1979 stage play by Christopher Durang
- Sister Mary Explains It All, 2001 film adaptation of above and directed by Marshall Brickman
- Sister Mary Elephant, a comedy skit by Cheech and Chong
