= Stoke, Worcestershire =

Civil parish in Worcestershire, England

Coordinates: 52.302°N 2.064°W

Stoke
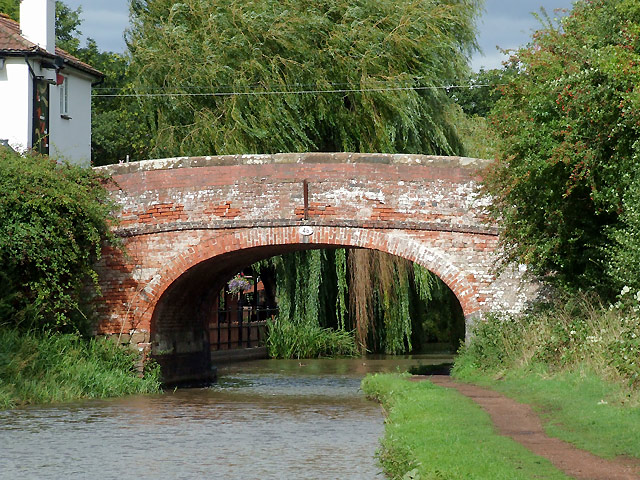
- Stoke Pound Bridge in 2010

- Location within Worcestershire
- Population: 4,965 (2021)
- OS grid reference: SO959673
- Civil parish: Stoke
- District: Bromsgrove
- Shire county: Worcestershire
- Region: West Midlands
- Country: England
- Sovereign state: United Kingdom
- Post town: BROMSGROVE
- Postcode district: B60
- Police: West Mercia
- Fire: Hereford and Worcester
- Ambulance: West Midlands
- UK Parliament: Bromsgrove

Stoke is a civil parish in Bromsgrove district, Worcestershire, England. The parish contains the settlements of Stoke Heath, Stoke Prior, Stoke Wharf, Stoke Pound and Woodgate. It had a population of 4,965 in 2021.

== History ==
The parish contains several historic buildings and landmarks, such as St Michael's Church in Stoke Prior, which presents several architectural styles, including Norman, Transitional and Early English. The church, first referenced in the early 12th-century, underwent major repair work during the 19th-century, with the north and west walls being rebuilt and the nave reroofed.

At the date of the Domesday Book in 1086, the land of Stoke Prior belonged to the monks of Worcester. The manor of Stoke Prior remained in possession of the priory until 1540 during the dissolution of the monasteries, with the manor being granted to the Dean and Chapter of Worcester in 1542.

The area is also known for its association with the 19th-century industrialist John Corbett, notable for his work in establishing the Stoke Prior Salt Works, which eventually became one of the largest salt workings in Europe. Corbett was also the Liberal Member of Parliament for Droitwich from 1874 to 1892.

The Avoncroft Museum of Historic Buildings is located in Stoke Heath.

== Geography ==
The parish includes the villages of Stoke Heath, Stoke Prior, Stoke Wharf, Stoke Pound and the hamlet of Woodgate. The River Salwarpe and the Worcester and Birmingham Canal flow through the parish, with the canal's Tardebigge Locks lying to the north of the parish. The Salwarpe is fed by several tributaries through Stoke Prior, such as the Sugar Brook.

== Politics ==
Stoke falls within the Bromsgrove parliament constituency, and is represented by the Conservative Party MP, Bradley Thomas, in the House of Commons. It is part of the non-metropolitan district of Bromsgrove and the non-metropolitan county of Worcestershire.

== Demographics ==
According to the 2021 UK census data, the civil parish has a population of 4,965, an increase from 4,490 in 2011. The largest ethnic group is White people, who make up 95.2% of the population. Christianity is the largest religion, with 56.4% of the parish identifying as Christians, followed by 40.6% with no religion.

=== Historical population ===
In 1871, Stoke Prior had around 330 houses, with this increasing to 370 in 1879.

Figures before 2001 include Stoke Prior only:

Population of Stoke: Year / 1861 / 1871 / 1879 / 2001 / 2011 / 2021; Population / 1,622 / 1,893 / 3,000 / 4,559 / 4,490 / 4,965
