= East Stoke =

East Stoke may refer to three places in the United Kingdom:

- East Stoke, Dorset
- East Stoke, Nottinghamshire
- East Stoke, Somerset

== See also ==
- North Stoke (disambiguation)
- South Stoke (disambiguation)
- Stoke (disambiguation)
