= Stoke Heath =

Stoke Heath may refer to:

- Stoke Heath, Worcestershire, an area in the south of Bromsgrove, Worcestershire, England
- Stoke Heath, Coventry, a suburb in the north of Coventry, England
- Stoke Heath, Shropshire, Shropshire, England
- Stoke Heath (HM Prison), a prison for young offenders in Stoke Heath, Shropshire
