= Bristol Uniforms =

British clothing company

- Company type: Subsidiary
- Industry: Personal Protective Equipment
- Founded: 1961; 65 years ago
- Founder: Patrick Seager Hill
- Headquarters: Bristol, United Kingdom
- Area served: Worldwide
- Products: Fire & Rescue uniforms
- Parent: MSA Safety
- Website: MSA Bristol

Bristol Uniforms is a British clothing company that specializes in the manufacture of modern-day safety and fire protective clothing.

== History ==
=== Wathen Gardiner & Co ===
Wathen Gardiner & Co, the parent company of Bristol Uniforms, was founded as Gardiner & Sons in the city of Bristol, England in 1801 by John Gardiner, who served in 1819 and 1824 as High Sheriff of Bristol. The firm operated initially as a wholesale clothing company that exported women’s clothing to the West Indies. When Bristol in the 19th century was considered a major player in the clothing industry, Wathen Gardiner & Co was reputed to be one of the oldest operating companies in the city.

Charles Wathen in 1862 joined the firm, and created a partnership in 1865 with John Gardiner's son, Henry Gardiner. The company name subsequently became Wathen Gardiner & Co. It grew and expanded its reach outside of Britain by exporting clothing to Latin America, Australia and New Zealand, often returning with wool that was used to make more clothing. Wathen retired in 1887 from the business and went on to become a six times Mayor of Bristol, being knighted in 1889 for his accomplishments. His business partner William Hill took over the company and served as the principal proprietor until the mid 1920s when he retired, being succeeded by his son William John Hill who took over ownership of the company.

Wathen Gardiner & Co under the stewardship of the Hill family made uniforms in both world wars for the armed forces, and started after the Second World War to supply uniforms to other organizations, including HM Customs and Excise, hospitals and water boards. When William John Hill retired in 1964 as principal proprietor, uniforms represented a major part of the company business.

=== Bristol Uniforms ===
Bristol Uniforms was incorporated on 15 November 1961 as a subsidiary of Wathen Gardner & Co, under the stewardship of William John Hill's son Patrick Seager Hill, who in 1965 became the sole proprietor & managing director. The company ultimately specialized in the manufacture of fire proximity suits, and fire protective and safety clothing for the Royal Air Force, the offshore oil industry, and fire brigades. Wathen Gardiner & Co and Bristol Uniforms remained separate companies until Wathen Gardiner & Co dropped their name, and merged with Bristol Uniforms, which still trades today.

As of February 22nd 2022, the company is now a subsidiary of MSA Safety.

== Gallery ==
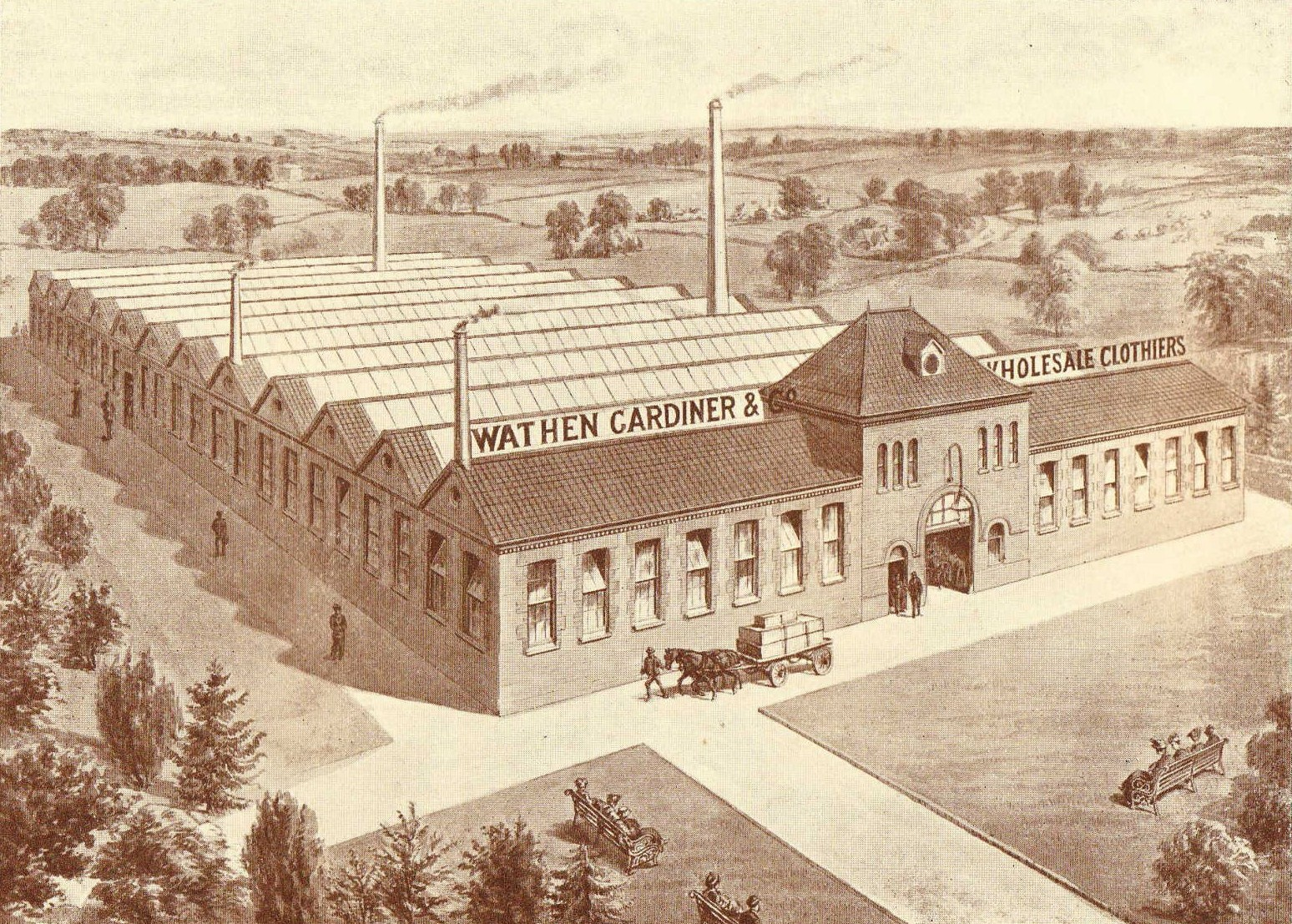
Later 19th-century drawing of the Bristol factory of Wathen Gardiner & Co

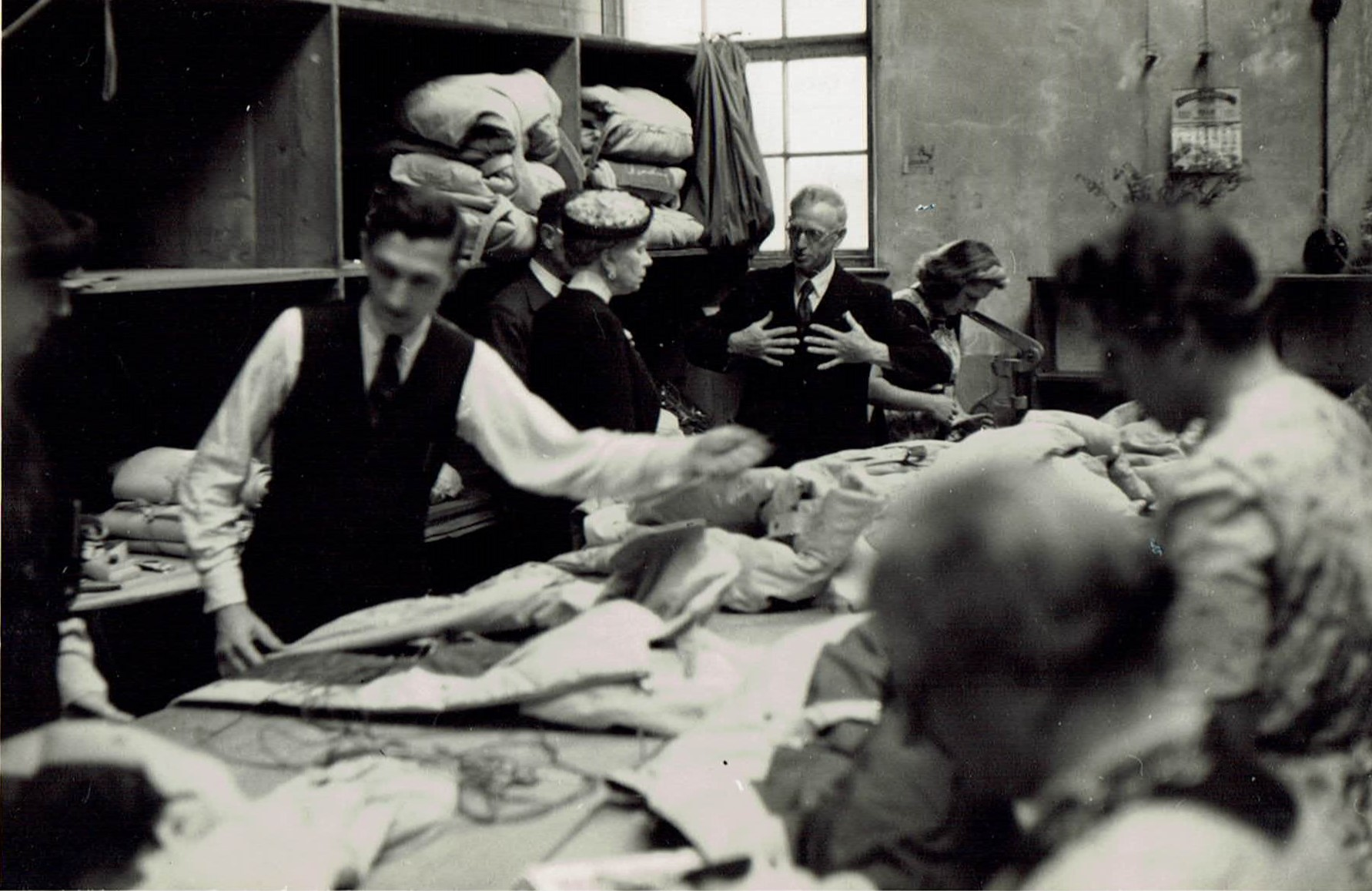
Fred Farnsworth, an employee, accompanying Queen Mary of Teck on a visit during WWII
