= Stoke City (disambiguation) =

Stoke City may refer to:

- Stoke City F.C., an English men's association football team
- Stoke City F.C. (Women), an English women's association football team
- Stoke-on-Trent, a city in England

== See also ==
- Stoke (disambiguation)
- Stroke City, a nickname for Derry/Londonderry, Northern Ireland
