= North Stoke =

North Stoke may refer to:

- North Stoke, Lincolnshire, a Domesday village cleared in 1841 to create the park at Stoke Rochford, England
- North Stoke, Oxfordshire, England
- North Stoke, Somerset, England
- North Stoke, West Sussex, England
- North Stoke (horse), a Thoroughbred racehorse

== See also ==
- South Stoke (disambiguation)
- East Stoke (disambiguation)
- Stoke (disambiguation)
