= Uffmoor Wood =

Woodland in Worcestershire

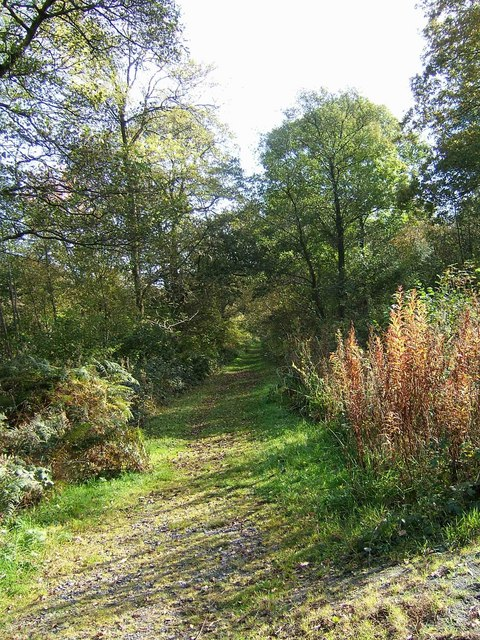

- Location within Worcestershire
- Interactive map of Uffmoor Wood

Geography
- Location: Worcestershire, England
- OS grid: SO952811
- Coordinates: 52.42786°N 2.07202°W
- Area: 84.84 hectares (209.6 acres)

Administration
- Authority: Woodland Trust

Uffmoor Wood is a semi-natural woodland in Worcestershire, in the English Midlands. It was acquired by the Woodland Trust from brushmaker, L G Harris & Co in 1985/86. The wood has an area of 84.84 hectares (209.6 acres), and grid reference SO952811. It sits off the A456 road at the foot of the Clent Hills about 3 km southwest of Halesowen.

In May 2017 the Trust temporarily suspended public access to the wood because of misbehaviour including dirt bike scrambling, drug peddling and public sexual acts.
