= Thomas de la Moore =

14th-century English knight and member of parliament

Sir Thomas de la Moore or More (died after 1347) of Northmoor, Oxfordshire, was an English knight and member of parliament. He was a follower of Edward II of England, and was present at the king's enforced abdication on 20 January 1327.

He was later a patron of Geoffrey le Baker, who wrote a royalist chronicle covering the years 1303 to 1356. Until its authorship was correctly identified in the 19th century by Edward Maunde Thompson, this chronicle was believed to have been written by Sir Thomas.
