= Chateau Impney =

French-style mansion in Worcestershire, England

Coordinates: 52.273823°N 2.132517°W

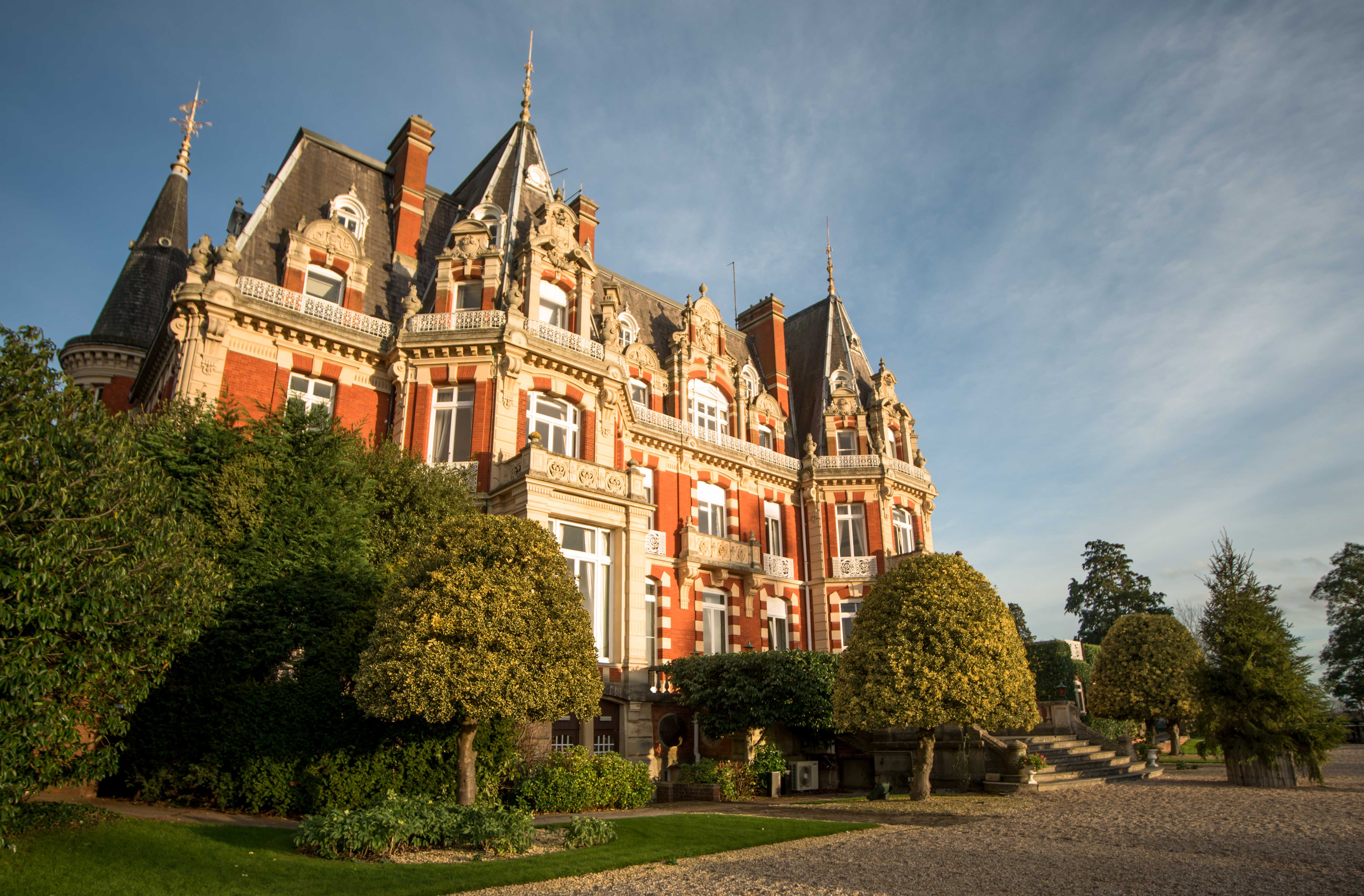
Chateau Impney

Chateau Impney Hotel & Exhibition Centre is a Grade II* listed 19th-century house built in the style of an elaborate French château near Droitwich Spa in Worcestershire, England. Of the large mansions in Worcestershire supported by industrial fortunes, Sir Nicolas Pevsner judged Impney to be "the showiest of them all in the county". Once a family home for local industrialist John Corbett, Chateau Impney has been a hotel since 1925.

Chateau Impney has 106 bedrooms, including boutique-styled rooms in the main building, and houses the Impney Restaurant and Bar and the Grand Bar, which features an oak-carved Jacobean staircase that extends upwards throughout the building and views that incorporate the Malvern Hills.

The hotel is also home to a number of conferencing facilities, including the Regent Centre, which is one of the largest exhibition spaces in the West Midlands.

Chateau Impney announced in 2020 that it would permanently close.

== History ==
=== 1869–1875 ===
Situated in extensive landscaped gardens, Impney Hall, as it was previously known, was designed from 1869 onwards and built in 1873–75 for local industrialist the saltworks magnate John Corbett in the Louis XIII style. It was a gift for Corbett's wife, Hannah Eliza O'Meara, who was of mixed French/Irish descent and had been raised in Paris, where her father was secretary to the Diplomatic Corps. Corbett applied for designs to the Parisian architect Auguste Tronquois, and employed the Beaux-Arts trained English architect Richard Phené Spiers as executive architect on site; the house cost GBP £247,000 (equivalent to £16,685,895.00 in 2007), to satisfy her nostalgia for Paris. The marriage was not a happy one, and she later took up residence in one of Corbett's properties in Tywyn, North Wales.

After Anna left, Corbett opened up the parkland and gardens that surrounded Impney Hall to the public every Wednesday, so that they could enjoy strolling through the estate and view the wildlife.

=== 1901–1928 ===
Corbett died in 1901 and left the estate to his brother, Thomas. When Thomas died in 1906, Impney Hall was let to a number of different families, including the Mitchell family of Birmingham, who were wealthy pen manufacturers. However, after the First World War, the house lay empty for some years.

In 1925, Impney Hall was sold to James Ward of Worcester for £15,000. James had been one of the original builders of the house, and by 1925 was himself a proprietor of Joseph Wood & Sons of Worcester. In that year, following a partial restoration and modernisation, the property was opened to residents as Impney Manor Hotel.

=== 1939 ===
Ward died before the Second World War broke out, and Impney Manor Hotel was requisitioned by the War Office, becoming the billets for the Officer Cadet Training Units. Throughout this time, Impney Hall was also used as a recruiting centre for the Auxiliary Territorial Service, a base for the Air Raid Precautions wardens, and a training centre for civil defence. Military camps were set up on the lawns of the parkland, the camp on the south side being for Italian prisoners of war, and the camp on the north side for what may have been displaced Polish personnel.

=== 1942–1963 ===
In 1942, Ralph Edwards of Ralph Edwards Enterprises bought Impney Hall, tempted by a War Damages settlement, but was not allowed to take possession until the property was derequisitioned in November 1946.

The war years had left the house in a neglected state, with thousands of pounds' worth of damage. Ralph and his wife restored the property, installing new lighting, introducing food lifts and plumbing, and clearing and replanting the grounds.

The Victorian dining room and conservatory on the ground floor were replaced by a ballroom and the Winter Gardens Restaurant. The library was turned into L'Aperitif, a grillroom that served traditional English food, and the basement area became the Corbett Tavern (now the Impney Restaurant and Bar), which was used as a venue for parties.

The majority of the bedrooms were restyled to include ensuite facilities, telephones, hot and cold water, and electric fires. The Fleur De Lys Residents' Lounge was created on the first floor, overlooking the terraced gardens. In April 1949, the hotel was renamed as Chateau Impney and opened to residents and visitors, and Ralph and his wife ran the hotel until 1963.

=== 1960s ===
Throughout the 1960s, Chateau Impney was considered a first-class venue for dining, weddings and parties.

The Imp Cellar Club – the first disco in the Midlands – was hosted in the basement area of the hotel. A casino was opened on the first floor and, as well as banquets and cabarets, there were film festivals attended by celebrities of the time. Many leading music groups of the era made their debut at the hotel, and it was a popular place to be seen. The Chateau also hosted "all-niters", where up-and-coming bands such as The Drifters and Jimmy Cliff and the Shakedown Sound, Katch 22, played to hundreds of fans. On 1 and 2 September 1968, the Bluesology festival, one of the earliest rock festivals in the UK, was held in the grounds, and featured Fleetwood Mac and Joe Cocker.

=== 1970–2009 ===
In 1971, Eric Pillon purchased Chateau Impney, but within 48 hours of becoming the new owner, he sold the property to Ken Jackson and Stephen Joynes from Develop and Prosper Holdings Ltd, who planned to refurbish the hotel, with aims to create more bedrooms and improve the facilities.

On 4 June 1972, the newly refurbished 66-bedroom hotel was declared open by the Secretary of State for the Environment, Peter Walker. The refurbishment cost £250,000 and included a banqueting hall to seat 250 people and 40 extra bedrooms.

Chateau Impney was sold to Queens Moat Houses in 1973, with Zeljko Stephen Raguz appointed as hotel manager. Between 1976 and 1980, he built the Conference and Events Centre. The expansive Regent Centre, intended as an exhibition space, later followed in 1992. Raguz bought Chateau Impney in 1981 and, at the same time, purchased the Raven Hotel and Worcestershire Brine Baths Hotel in Droitwich, which both have historical ties to John Corbett. Raguz ran Chateau Impney until 2009, when poor health made him unable to continue.

=== 2009–present ===
The hotel entered administration in 2009, and was bought out in 2012 by Greyfort Hotels. An extensive refurbishment programme was planned and began later that year, aiming to sympathetically restore the building and update its accommodation.

Thus far, the main bedrooms in the hotel have been refurbished, including its two feature rooms, to include luxury detailing and modern technology, and the other rooms in the hotel's extension and grounds are to be updated as well. In particular, the two feature rooms follow John Corbett's original designs and furnishings as closely as possible while maintaining a modern approach, based on his original photographs that still remain in the hotel today. The function rooms have been carefully restored, maintaining the original ceiling mouldings and panels, and original features such as the oak-carved Jacobean staircase and stained glass windows in the Grand Bar have been sympathetically cared for and renewed.

On 2 December 2013, The Impney Restaurant & Bar was officially opened to the public. The new restaurant and bar combined the original downstairs restaurant and bar, which were known separately as Jason's Carving Room and Corbett's Bar, to provide a more open and contemporary space.

Across 2014, Chateau Impney embarked on a tree planting scheme to restore its 110 acres of parkland to Corbett's original intentions. The scheme saw over 200 trees planted within the grounds of the Chateau, the cultivation of an orchard to allow the hotel to become more self-sufficient and the removal of fencing to allow the grounds to return to the open parkland setting that was present during Corbett’s residency.

In March 2020, at the start of the Coronavirus pandemic resulting in the closure of public buildings including hotels, the Chateau was temporarily closed. This led to the announcement in April 2020 of the hotel closing permanently and the redundancy of the staff.

The owners submitted, in October 2025, to the District Council a plan for redevelopment of the site. A hotel and restaurant will once again be housed in the main building. Also added to the estate will be 127 new houses, businesses and parkland.

== Hill climb ==
In the 1950s and 1960s, the hotel hosted the Chateau Impney Hill Climb speed trials. The first event took place in 1957, and the original course was 550 yards (500 m) long. The event attracted some of the biggest motorsport personalities of the day, including Tony Marsh, Phil Scragg and David Good. Good was the inaugural winner of the event and, despite only having one arm, completed the course in just 24.64 seconds.

On 4 December 2013, the hotel held a gala to celebrate the original speed trials, and to gauge public interest in the potential return of the hill climb. The event was a success, drawing in over 1,000 attendees and receiving coverage on BBC Midlands Today, ITV Central and regional radio. The inaugural revival event took place in July 2015.

On 20 December 2019, in an article titled 'Chateau Impney’s next chapter', it was announced that the Chateau Impney Hill Climb would not be returning in 2020 and that "The 2019 Chateau Impney Hill Climb will be the last of this series of motoring events at Chateau Impney."
