= Stoke Goldington Steam Rally =

Steam festival in Buckinghamshire, England

Coordinates: 52.129°N 0.780°W

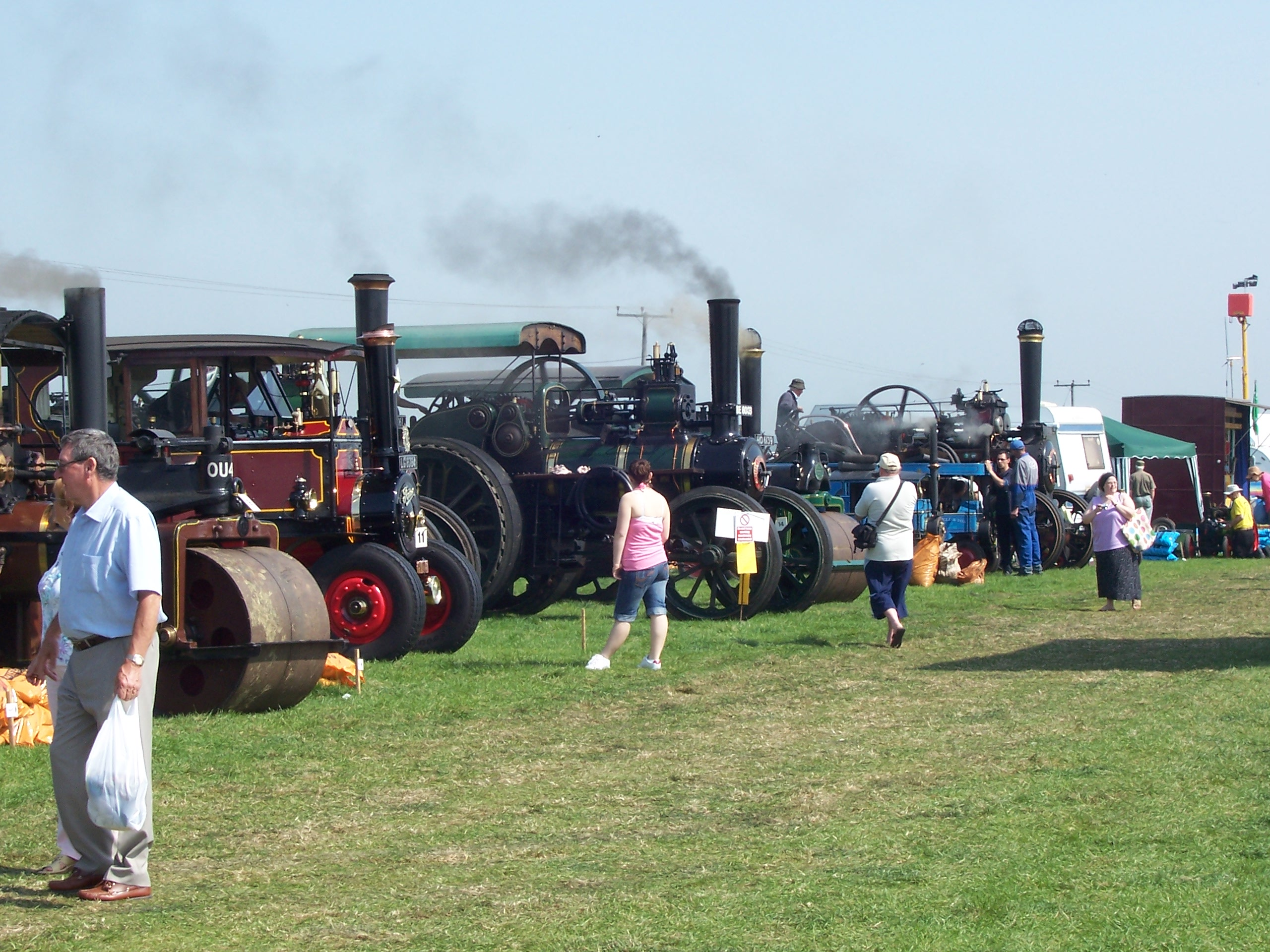
Steam Engine Line 2008

Stoke Goldington Steam Rally & Country Fayre was an annual show which showcased UK heritage in the form of Steam Engines, Stationary Engines, vintage tractors and other agricultural machinery. The show was held on the second weekend in May, at Westside Farm, in Stoke Goldington (near Milton Keynes), for most of its approximately thirty-five year life, with the first show in 1976. The show was run by villagers and exhibit experts from the surrounding villages, and was set up to provide funds for the Stoke Goldington Village Hall which was opened in 1976.

The events were set on a 40-acre (160,000 m^{2}) site on a hillside above the village.
