= Charles Wathen =

British wool merchant, mayor of Bristol

Sir Charles Wathen (19 March 1833 - 14 February 1893) was a prominent Victorian wool merchant who from 1865 to 1887 ran the well-known British clothing firm of Wathen Gardiner & Co, and served six times as Mayor of Bristol.

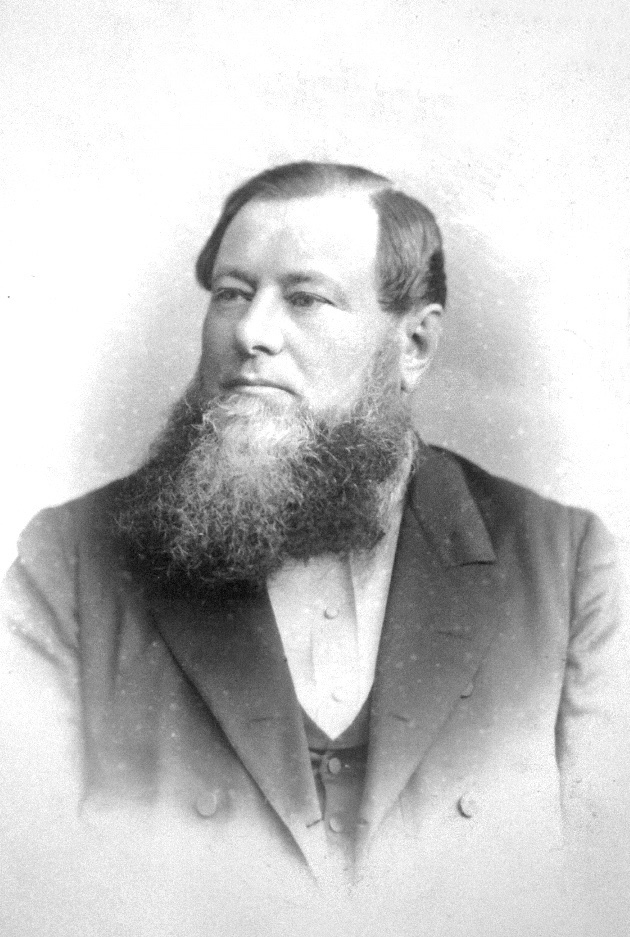
Charles Wathen

He was knighted for his accomplishments on 1 January 1889 during his fourth term as mayor by Queen Victoria. He died on 14 February 1893 shortly after collapsing on the floor of the Bristol City council chamber at the conclusion of an address he had just given to the city fathers. His grave in the Arnos Vale Cemetery is marked by a stone memorial with an epitaph that identifies him as "Charles Wathen, Kt. who died suddenly in the Council Chamber."
