= Old Stoke =

Old Stoke or Oldstoke, may refer to:

- Stoke, Suffolk, England, UK
- Stoke Charity, Hampshire, England, UK

== See also ==
- Old Church Stoke
- Stoke (disambiguation)
