= Stoker =

Stoker may refer to:

== Arts and entertainment ==
- "The Stoker", a 1927 short story by Franz Kafka
- The Stoker (1932 film), an American drama/romance film directed by Chester M. Franklin
- The Stoker (1935 film), a British comedy film directed by Leslie Pearce
- A Stoker, a 2010 Russian crime film
- Stoker (film), a 2013 American psychological thriller film directed by Park Chan-wook
- "Stoker" (Sliders), a television episode
- The title character of Stoker the Broker (1960–1985) a US comic strip
- Bram Stoker Award for horror writing
- Stoker (band), a South African hard rock band

== People ==
- Stoker (surname), a list of notable people with the surname
  - Bram Stoker (1847-1912), Irish author, wrote Dracula
- Walter Stoker Edwards (1900-1964), British politician
- Andy "Stoker" Growcott (born 1959), a former member of the band Dexys Midnight Runners
- Stoker (occupation), the person who tends the fire for the running of a steam engine
- The person on the rear seat of a tandem bicycle, i.e. the one who delivers power to the machine

== Other uses ==
- Fire iron, used for shifting burning coals in a hearth
- Mechanical stoker, a machine which replaces the human occupation
- Cleveland Stokers (1967–68), an American soccer team
- Stoker Island, South Shetland Islands, Antarctica
- The Stoker Company, a pesticide producer and applier in Imperial County, California
