= Fire proximity suit =

Suit designed to protect from high temperatures

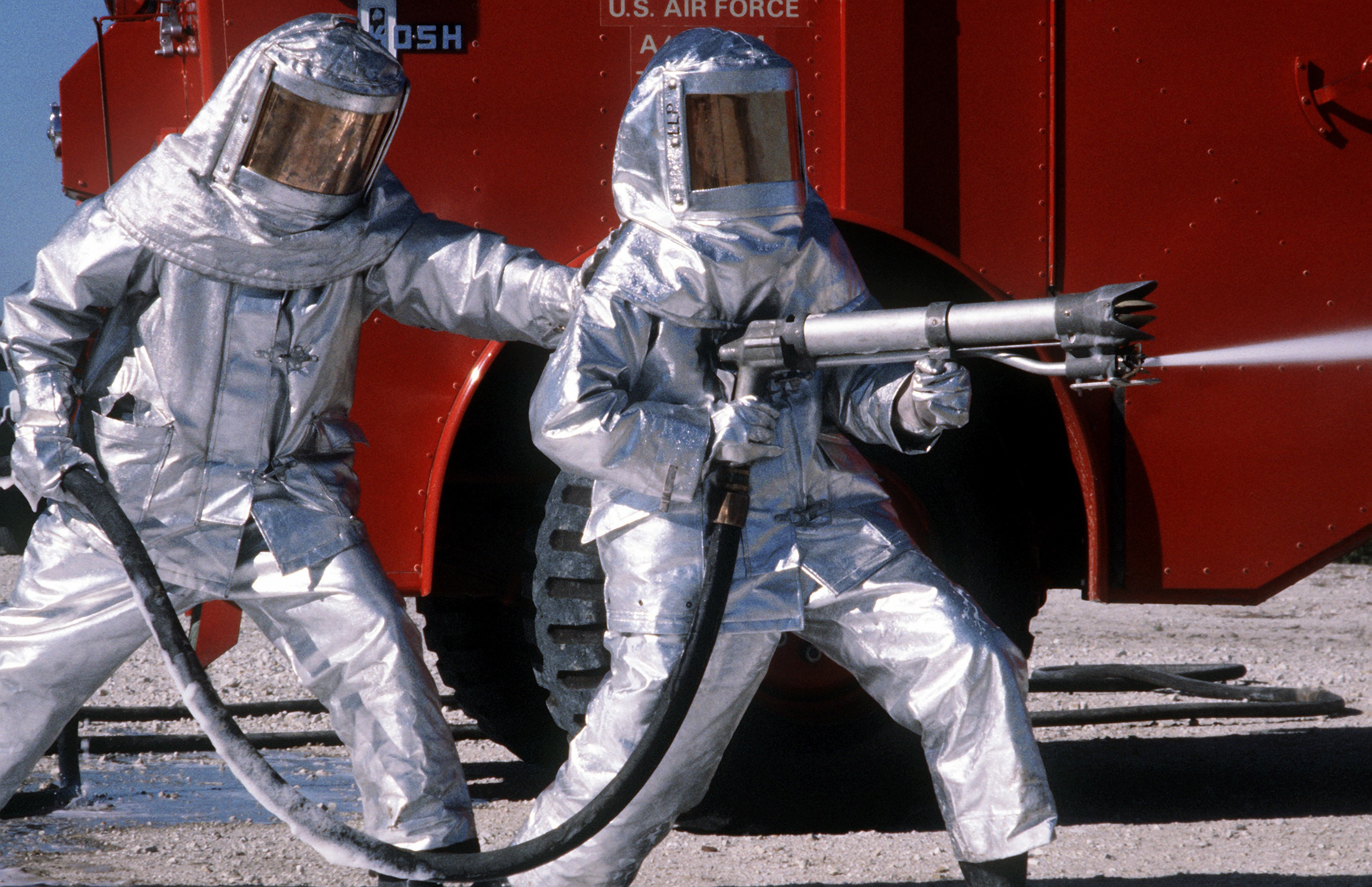
Firefighters training at a U.S. Air Force base in fire proximity suits

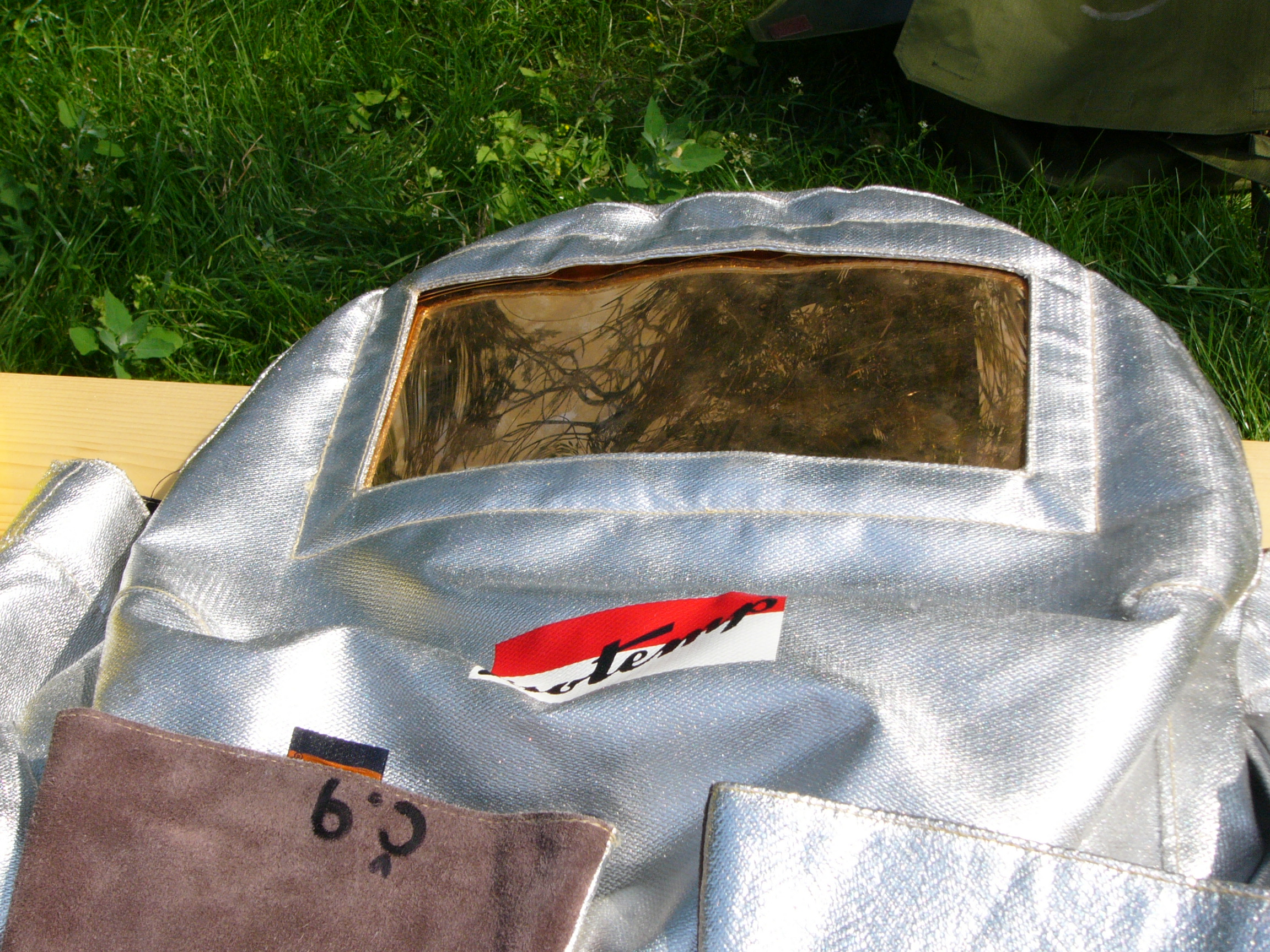
Detail of fire proximity suit

A fire proximity suit (also, silvers, silver bunker suit, or asbestos suit) is a suit designed to protect a firefighter or volcanologist from extremely high temperatures. They were first designed and used in the 1930s. Originally made of asbestos fabric, current models use vacuum-deposited aluminized materials.

== History ==
Fire proximity suits first appeared during the 1930s, and were originally made of asbestos fabric. Today, they are manufactured from vacuum-deposited aluminized materials that reflect the high radiant loads produced by the fire.

An early manufacturer of the aluminized suits was the Bristol Uniforms company under the direction of Patrick Seager Hill.

In North America, the National Fire Protection Association publishes the requirements for fire proximity suits under NFPA 1971, Standard on Protective Ensembles for Structural Fire Fighting and Proximity Fire Fighting. In order to comply with the NFPA standard, the components of the proximity suit are required to be tested and certified by independent third parties, and bear the certifying body's logo and a compliance statement. Such third-party certifications are issued by the Safety Equipment Institute (SEI) and UL Solutions.

== Types ==
There are three basic types of these aluminized suits:

- Approach suit—used for work in the general area of high temperatures, such as steel mills and smelting facilities. These usually provide ambient heat protection up to ≈200 °F (90 °C).
- Proximity suit—used for instance in aircraft rescue and fire fighting (ARFF), providing ambient heat protection up to ≈500 °F (260 °C).
- Entry suit—used for entry into extreme heat, such as kiln work requiring entry into the heated kiln, and situations requiring protection from total flame engulfment. Most commonly made of Zetex or vermiculite and not aluminized. These provide ambient protection up to ≈2,000 °F (1,100 °C) for short duration, and prolonged radiant heat protection up to ≈1,500 °F (800 °C).

Complete proximity protection for ARFF requires:

- Aluminized hood or helmet cover with neck shroud,
- Aluminized jacket and pants complete with vapor barrier insulated liner,
- Aluminized lined gloves,
- Aluminized ARFF boots,
- Self-contained breathing apparatus (SCBA) (aluminized covers for air bottles, or suits that cover the air pack are also available).

== See also ==
- Hazmat suit – Protective suit against chemical, bacteriological, and nuclear risks
