= South Stoke =

South Stoke could be one of the following places in England:

- South Stoke, Lincolnshire - old name for Stoke Rochford
- South Stoke, Oxfordshire
- South Stoke, Somerset
- South Stoke, West Sussex

== See also ==
- North Stoke (disambiguation)
- East Stoke (disambiguation)
- Stoke (disambiguation)
