= LG Harris & Co =

British manufacturer of decorating tools

L. G. Harris & Co Ltd is a British manufacturer of paint brushes and decorating products founded in a workshop in Birmingham in 1928. It is the largest manufacturer of decorating paint brushes and painting products in the UK.

It was founded in 1928 as the Midland Trading Company. The current company was incorporated in 1930, according to Open Corporates, incorporation date and renamed LG Harris in 1932. The business moved to Stoke Prior, near Bromsgrove in Worcestershire in 1936. The family-run firm was acquired by Norwegian consumer products group Orkla Group in May 2016.

Their brushes are primarily for the building trade and DIY markets. It is the largest brush manufacturer in the UK.

After completion of new buildings on Hanbury Road in 1959, and new warehousing in 1974 the company was operating from a 220,000 sq ft works, and in the 1980s owned over 2000 acres of woodland within a 20-mile radius as a source of the hardwood for the handles of its brushes. The company expanded abroad investing in a Wholly Foreign-Owned Enterprise in China.

The founder, Leslie George Harris, ran his business on Quaker principles, and was a major sponsor of arts and music during the 1960s.

== Recognition ==
In 1961, the company was awarded the Royal Warrant by Her Majesty Queen Elizabeth II, for supply of its pig-bristle brushes and decorating tools to the Royal Sandringham Estate.

The company won the West Midlands Export Business of the Year in 2015.

== Local woodlands ==
LG Harris owned a number of plantations such as Little Goosehill Wood and Uffmoor Wood in Worcestershire which it intended to use to produce handles, but sold these off in the 1980s.
