= Stoke Prior =

Stoke Prior may refer to:

- Stoke Prior, Herefordshire
- Stoke Prior, Worcestershire
