= Stoke Park =

Stoke Park may refer to:

- Stoke Park, Bristol
  - Stoke Park Hospital, Bristol
  - The Dower House, Stoke Park, or Stoke Park House, Stoke Gifford
- Stoke Park, Buckinghamshire, an estate, now the Stoke Park Country Club, Spa & Hotel
- Stoke Park, Guildford
- Stoke Park, Suffolk, a suburb of Ipswich
  - Stoke Park Ward, Ipswich
- Stoke Park, an early name of Erlestoke Park, Wiltshire

== See also ==
- Stoke Park Pavilions, Northamptonshire
- Stoke Park School
- Stoke Park Wood, Stoke Rochford
- Stoke Park Woods, Bishopstoke
- Stokes National Park, Western Australia
- Stokes State Forest, New Jersey
