= Stoke Hall =

Stoke Hall may refer to any of the following:

- Stoke Hall, Cheshire
- Stoke Hall, Derbyshire
- Stoke Hall, Nottinghamshire
- Stoke Hall, Ipswich
