= Thomas Gurney (knight) =

Alleged assassin of King Edward II of England

Thomas (de) Gurney (died before 7 July 1333) was a 14th-century English knight. Born into a modest noble family, he faithfully served successively Maurice de Berkeley, 2nd Baron Berkeley, and then Roger Mortimer, 1st Earl of March, both influential lords with a strong presence in the Welsh Marches. In this capacity, he participated in Mortimer's unsuccessful rebellion against King Edward II in 1322 and was imprisoned by the king for two years before being released after paying a fine.

Thomas Gurney's role increased in 1327 when he was appointed by Roger Mortimer as Edward II's jailer after his deposition. He was subsequently alleged to be one of the murderers of Edward II due to the latter's mysterious death after a few months of captivity. In this capacity, Gurney was condemned for regicide by King Edward III shortly after Mortimer's execution in 1330. Fleeing to the continent, Gurney was arrested by royal officers and died while being extradited to England in 1333.

== Biography ==
=== Origins, youth, and rebellion ===
Thomas Gurney came from a Somerset gentry family. Born in the late 13th century, he was the son of Thomas Gurney, a knight who owned some lands in Englishcombe and Farrington Gurney. His father took part in several of King Edward I's military campaigns in Scotland, continuing until 1301. Thomas Gurney the Elder likely died shortly after this date. There is also another Thomas Gurney, originally from East Harptree and who died in 1343: he may have been a cousin of Thomas Gurney the Younger. The first real information we have about the younger Thomas Gurney is from 1307, when he was entrusted with the task of collecting royal taxes in Somerset. On 3 November 1314, Thomas was implicated with his relative Anselm Gurney in a theft of horses, oxen, sheep, and pigs at Langridge. However, he quickly became a servant of his lord, Maurice de Berkeley, an important baron of the Welsh Marches. By 1316, Gurney was serving in the garrison of the town of Berwick, of which Berkeley was governor. As the Berkeleys were themselves vassals of the Earl of Pembroke, he was also part of the Earl's entourage. It is also known that he wore royal livery in April 1318, which may suggest that Thomas Gurney was present at that time in King Edward II's retainer during his numerous travels to England.

However, Gurney accompanied Thomas de Berkeley, Maurice's eldest son, and his followers when they jointly raided one of the Earl of Pembroke's forests in Gloucestershire on 31 July 1318. Despite Pembroke's efforts to have those responsible arrested, the suspects were not brought to justice, perhaps due to Maurice de Berkeley's intervention on their behalf. Alongside Thomas de Berkeley and John Maltravers, Gurney even captured the Gloucestershire justices in charge of reopening the case in the autumn of 1319.] A few years later, he joined Maurice de Berkeley's entourage when he entered the service of the powerful Baron Roger Mortimer. Gurney supported Mortimer in his revolt against Edward II in May 1321. In retaliation, the king ordered the confiscation of his estates on 7 December. Edward suppressed the rebellion in March 1322 and had Gurney, captured by royal troops, imprisoned in the Tower of London. On 1 July 1324, Thomas Gurney was eventually pardoned and fined 100 pounds, before having his property returned. On 7 January 1325, during the War of Saint-Sardos, he was summoned by the king to fight in Gascony against the French army. Finally, on 25 March 1326, he received permission to pay his fine over a period of ten years.

=== Gaoler of Edward II and services to Mortimer ===
In the autumn of 1326, Roger Mortimer overthrew Edward II, assisted by Edward's wife, Queen Isabella. It has been suggested that Gurney had joined Mortimer in France before the invasion, but this is unlikely. On 14 February 1327, Gurney was granted a pardon for his part in the barons' revolt of 1321. On 3 April 1327, he, jointly with John Maltravers and Thomas de Berkeley, was charged with the custody of Edward II, who had been deposed by Parliament the previous January. The deposed king was imprisoned at Berkeley Castle, but was frequently moved from castle to castle by his captors to make any attempts at rescue more difficult. Edward was eventually returned to Berkeley Castle, where he apparently died on 21 September. Many suspected Mortimer of having ordered the assassination of the deposed monarch. In fact, Gurney was immediately considered one of his possible assassins, alongside John Maltravers and William Ockley. However, there is no evidence to confirm that Edward II was assassinated, or even that he managed to secretly escape from his prison to live in exile incognito, as several chroniclers have suggested.

The day after the death – at least as commonly believed – of his prisoner, Thomas Gurney was sent by Thomas de Berkeley to Lincoln, where Queen Isabella and her son King Edward III were staying, to inform them of the former king's death. He probably arrived there on the evening of 23 September and shared the news with the young monarch, before it was communicated to Parliament and the rest of the kingdom in the following days. After Edward II's death, Gurney became one of Roger Mortimer's most trusted men. Before December 1328, he was entrusted with the custody of Hugh le Despenser: imprisoned since March 1327 by the regime of Mortimer and Isabella, Despenser constituted a threat in their eyes, due to his proximity to the former sovereign, and remained closely watched. Gurney received several orders to move his residence: it is known that a transfer took place to Bristol Castle at the end of 1328. The favours Gurney received, however, were not as distinguished as those of Maltravers, probably as a result of the fact that he was born of low extraction. This is why it is difficult to determine his activities or his functions during the rest of Roger Mortimer's regency.

=== Conviction, capture and death ===
On 19 October 1330, Edward III overthrew Roger Mortimer and had his most ardent supporters hunted down. Mortimer, executed on 29 November, was accused at his trial, among other things, of having ordered the death of Edward II at Berkeley Castle after his deposition three years earlier. For the first time, the death of the previous monarch was officially described as murder, although his jailers had previously maintained that he had died of natural causes. Thomas Gurney, accused of having participated in the assassination of the former sovereign, immediately had a price put on his head of 40 pounds or 100 marks. Sentenced to death in absentia by Parliament, he embarked at Mousehole in Cornwall in late 1330 or early 1331 with other supporters of Mortimer, including John Maltravers. His wife, Joan Furneaux, and their five children, remained in England but were not troubled by the king. During a new trial convened by Edward III in March 1331, the charges against Gurney for his involvement in the death of Edward II were confirmed. The king also ordered the confiscation of the fugitive's property. Another of Roger Mortimer's associates, William Ockley, was also accused of the murder of the deposed king but had disappeared after Mortimer's fall.

That same year, Thomas Gurney was recognised in Burgos in Castile by an English pilgrim, Isolda Belhouse. She accused Gurney of regicide and obtained his arrest from the Castilian authorities. Before he could be extradited to England, Gurney escaped to Aragon, and then to Naples. The English agent, William of Cornwall, tracked him down in Naples and arrested him. Upon being informed, Edward III sent Baron William Thweng to Italy to bring Gurney back to England. Thweng took Gurney by ship, stopping in Collioure and in Bayonne, then in English Aquitaine. Thomas Gurney died there in the summer of 1333. There are rumours that Oliver Ingham, the Seneschal of Gascony, had him executed for regicide, but this conclusion seems unfounded and it is far more likely that Gurney died of illness. William Thweng returned to England and informed the king of Gurney's death on 7 July 1333. Following Thomas Gurney's conviction, Joan Furneaux had obtained restitution of her husband's property, including West Harptree, Englishcombe, and Farrington, in May 1331. Finally, in November 1339, their eldest son Thomas, now of age, successfully petitioned Edward III to take possession of his property, which was handed over to him in March 1340.

== Descendants ==
In 1317 or 1318, Thomas Gurney married Joan Furneaux, the widow of Thomas Trivet. Their marriage produced five children:

- Thomas Gurney (9 February 1319 – after 1345);
- John Gurney;
- Matthew Gurney (? – 1406), married Alice Beauchamp, then Philippa Talbot;
- Edmund Gurney;
- Joan Gurney, married Matthew Branch.

== Media ==
Playwright Christopher Marlowe includes Gurney in his play Edward II, in which he is portrayed as one of the assassins of the King of England.

Thomas Gurney is a minor character in Maurice Druon's historical drama series of novels The Accursed Kings (Les Rois maudits). Druon also spreads the myth that Edward II was killed by his captors by having a red-hot iron inserted into his anus, which would have had the benefit of making the deposed ruler's death appear natural.

== Sources ==
- Fryde, Natalie (2003). The tyranny and fall of Edward II 1321–1326. Cambridge: Cambridge University Press. ISBN 0-521-54806-3.
- Haines, Roy Martin (2003). "Sir Thomas Gurney of Englishcombe in the County of Somerset, Regicide?" (PDF). Proceedings of the Somerset Archaeological and Natural History Society (147). Somerset Archaeological and Natural History Society.
- Phillips, Seymour (1972). Aymer de Valence, Earl of Pembroke, 1307–1324. Baronial Politics in the Reign of Edward II. Oxford: Clarendon Press. ISBN 0-19-822359-5.
- Phillips, Seymour (2010). Edward II. New Haven: Yale University Press. ISBN 978-0-300-15657-7.
