= Stoke Tunnel =

Stoke Tunnel may refer to:

- Stoke Tunnel (Ipswich), on the Great Eastern Main Line in Suffolk, England
- Stoke Tunnel (Lincolnshire), on the East Coast Main Line in Lincolnshire, England
