= Avoncroft Museum of Historic Buildings =

Museum in Worcestershire, England

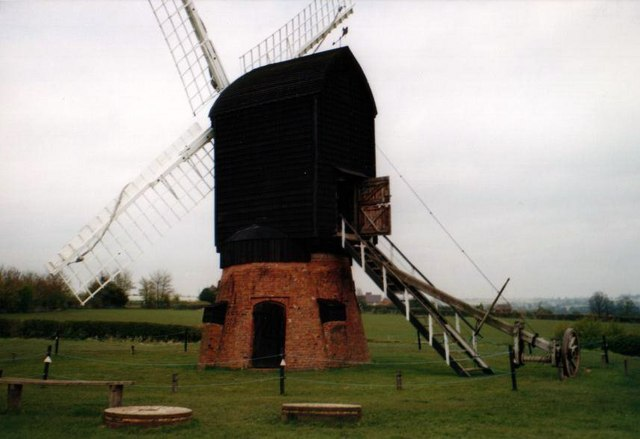
- Established: 1963
- Location: Stoke Heath, Bromsgrove, England
- Coordinates: 52.314°N 2.072°W
- Type: Local independent museum
- Website: www.avoncroft.org.uk

Avoncroft Museum of Historic Buildings is an open-air museum of rescued buildings which have been relocated to its site in Stoke Heath, a district of Bromsgrove, Worcestershire, England. Founded in 1963 and opened in 1967, the museum was conceived following the dismantling of a 15th-century timber-framed house in Bromsgrove in 1962 to provide a location for its reconstruction. It became England's first open-air museum and, after the St Fagans National Museum of History in Wales, the second in the United Kingdom. This building is known as the medieval 'Town House' today, though it has been known by other names in the past, including the 'Bromsgrove House' and the 'Merchant's House'. It now houses a collection of domestic, industrial, agricultural and other forms of historic building, the majority dismantled and re-erected.

The museum's collection comprises more than 30 buildings and structures which have been relocated from their original sites under threat of demolition, being rebuilt and restored at the museum. This includes a fully functioning windmill and a post WW2 prefab house as used in many towns and cities after the Second World War to provide quick affordable replacements for houses destroyed by bombing. The Arcon V prefabricated house was originally constructed on Moat Lane in Yardley, Birmingham and was transported to the museum in 1981.

Weddings and receptions are frequently held in The New Guesten Hall, a building at the museum which was built to incorporate the preserved timber roof of Guesten Hall, originally built next to Worcester Cathedral for entertaining the Prior's guests. The New Guesten Hall is also used by outside parties for concerts, conferences, exhibitions and meetings. The museum's Victorian church, a "tin church" originally built in 1891 at Bringsty Common, Herefordshire, was opened and re-dedicated in 1996 and services are held there during the museum's open season. The church is also licensed for wedding blessings.

The other exhibits, which span over 700 years of history, include a perry mill from Redditch, a toll house from Little Malvern, a fibreglass spire from Smethwick, an earth closet, a cruck-frame barn and a counting house.

== Exhibits ==
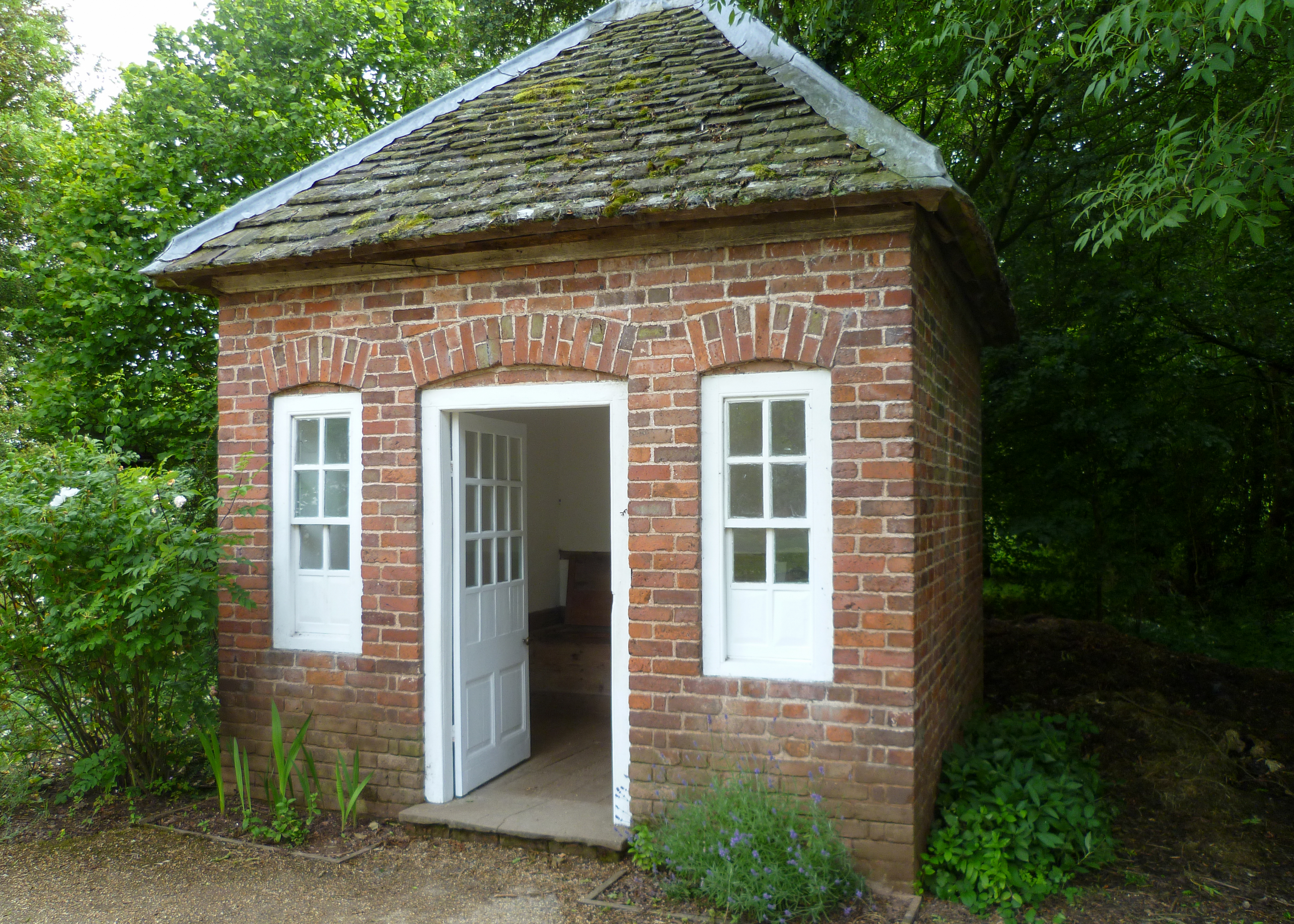
Townsend House privy

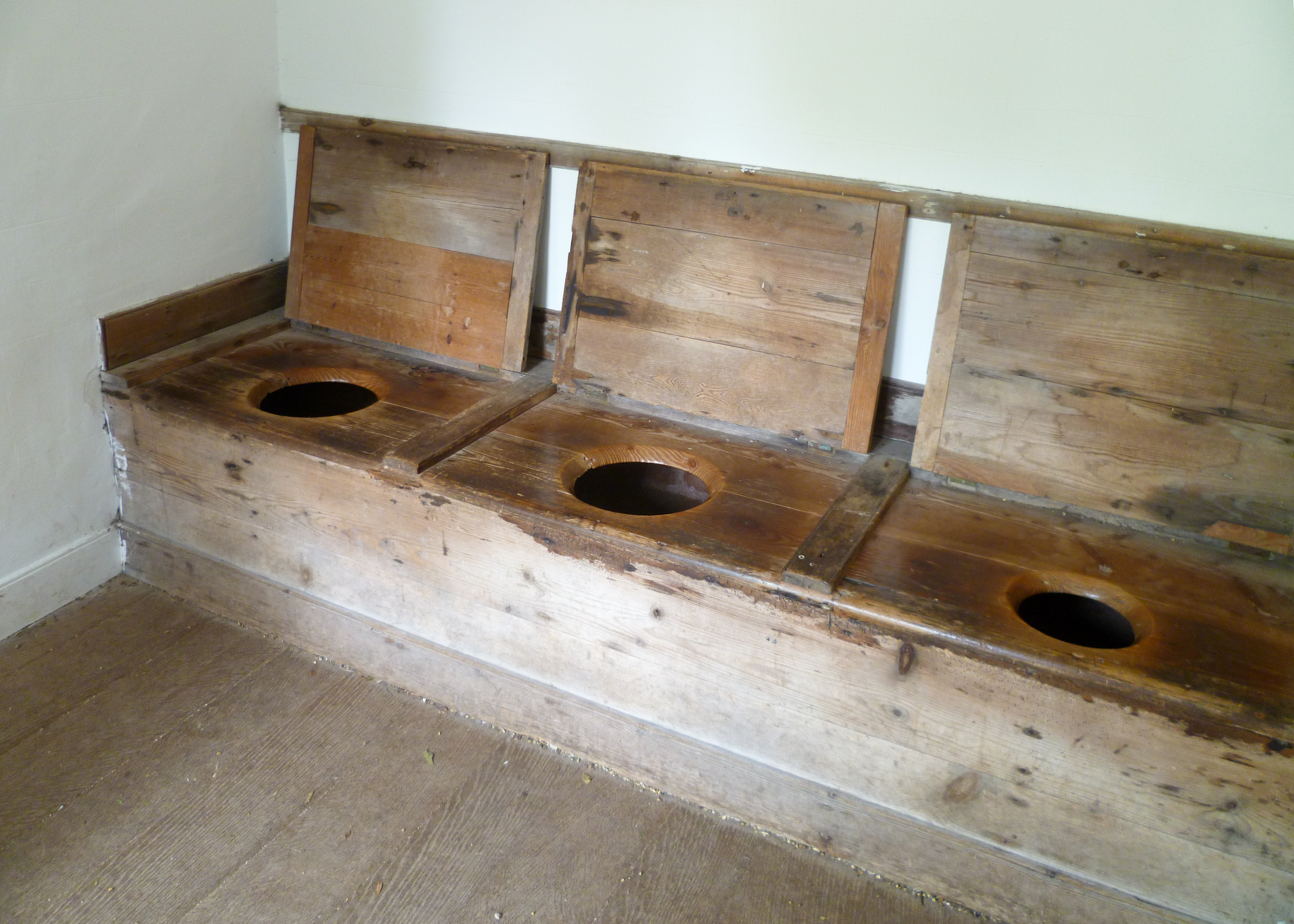
Townsend House privy

The buildings and structures at the museum were all moved there to save them from demolition they would have faced in their previous locations, either through wilful destruction or neglect. Together, they represent over 700 years of history from the Midlands and a little further beyond.

The town house, windmill and granary were dismantled, restored and fully reconstructed by Gunolt Daniel Greiner (born 1915 in Jugenheim) and his son Francis Benedict Joseph Greiner. These were the only buildings restored by him in Avoncroft. They then also dismantled, restored and fully reconstructed other 15th century buildings at various open-air museums in England, for example the Bayleaf house and Market Guildhall at the Weald and Downland Open Air Museum near Chichester. Gunolt always kept to the original style of the buildings and when the original format was unknown he would put a simple plain unembellished section. An example of this is a plain oak block stairway (demonstrated in the town house).

The buildings include industrial buildings (for example the chain shop), residential / domestic buildings (for example the prefab and toll house), religious buildings (such as the church), agricultural buildings (such as the windmill, barn and stable), buildings for entertainment (such as the cockpit) and others that don't fit these categories (such as the cell block, earth closet and ice house).

Some of the buildings are furnished internally to present a view of life in a particular era in that building. Others are empty, or contain other display materials.

The museum also has a small objects collection which support the large objects collection. Some of these are displayed in the buildings, whilst the rest are kept in the museum store.

The museum also contains the UK's National telephone kiosk Collection. This is the largest collection of telephone kiosks in the country and is part of the Connected Earth heritage project. There are also three fully working analogue telephone exchanges (one of them a mobile TXE2), a manual switchboard and early automatic systems. The collection shows the complete history of telephone kiosks in the UK from 1912 to the 1990s together with demonstrations of how telephone calls were routed and connected before the advent of digital technology.

== Events ==
The museum has a wide and varied events programme that changes every year. Events are largely family-focussed, with some events aimed at an older adult audience. Because of the family focus, events are largely centred on bank holiday weekends and school holidays.

Events often have historical themes and feature re-enactors from various time periods, including Wars of the Roses, Victorian, and 1940s.

== Gallery ==
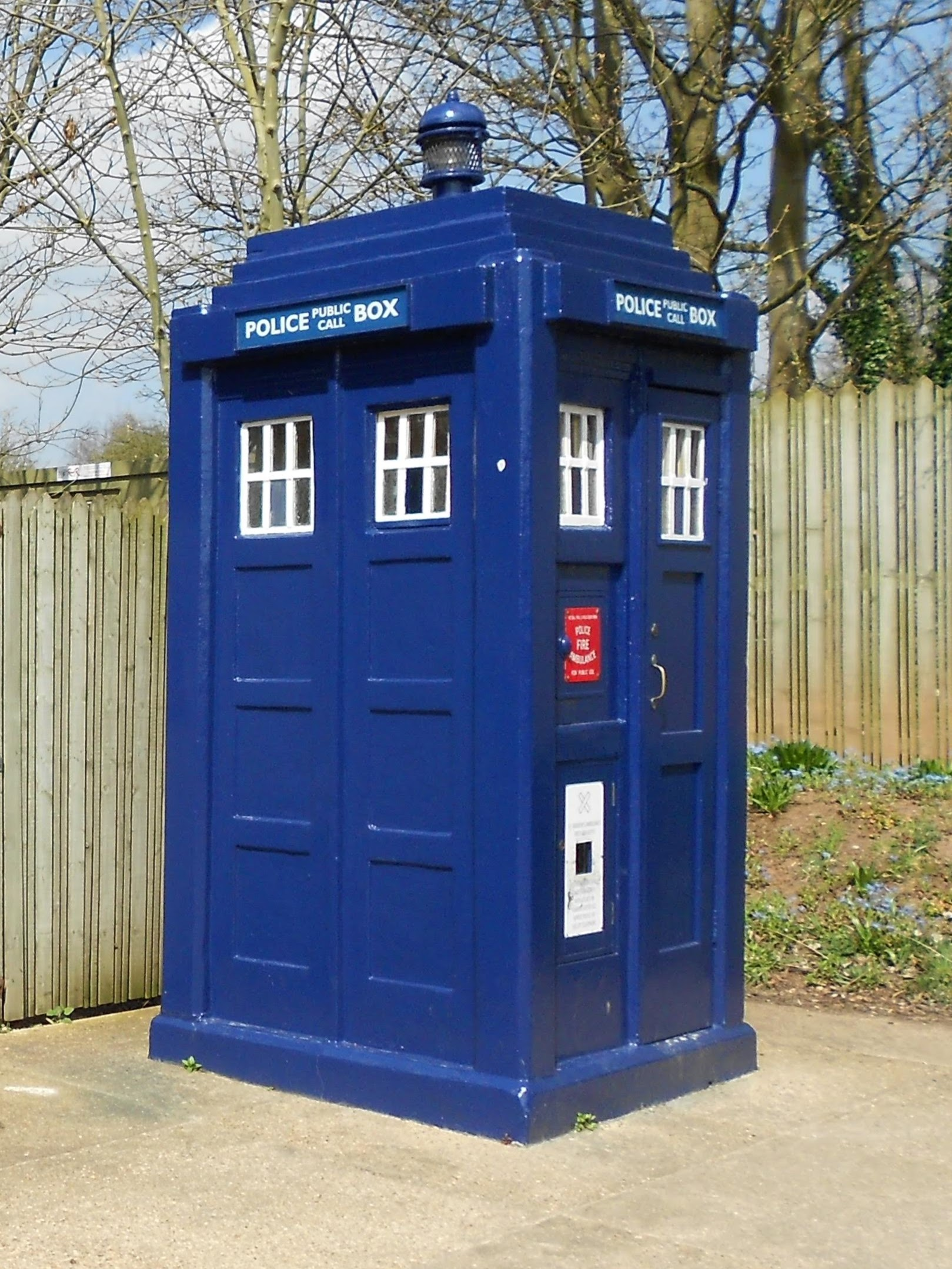
Glasgow police box

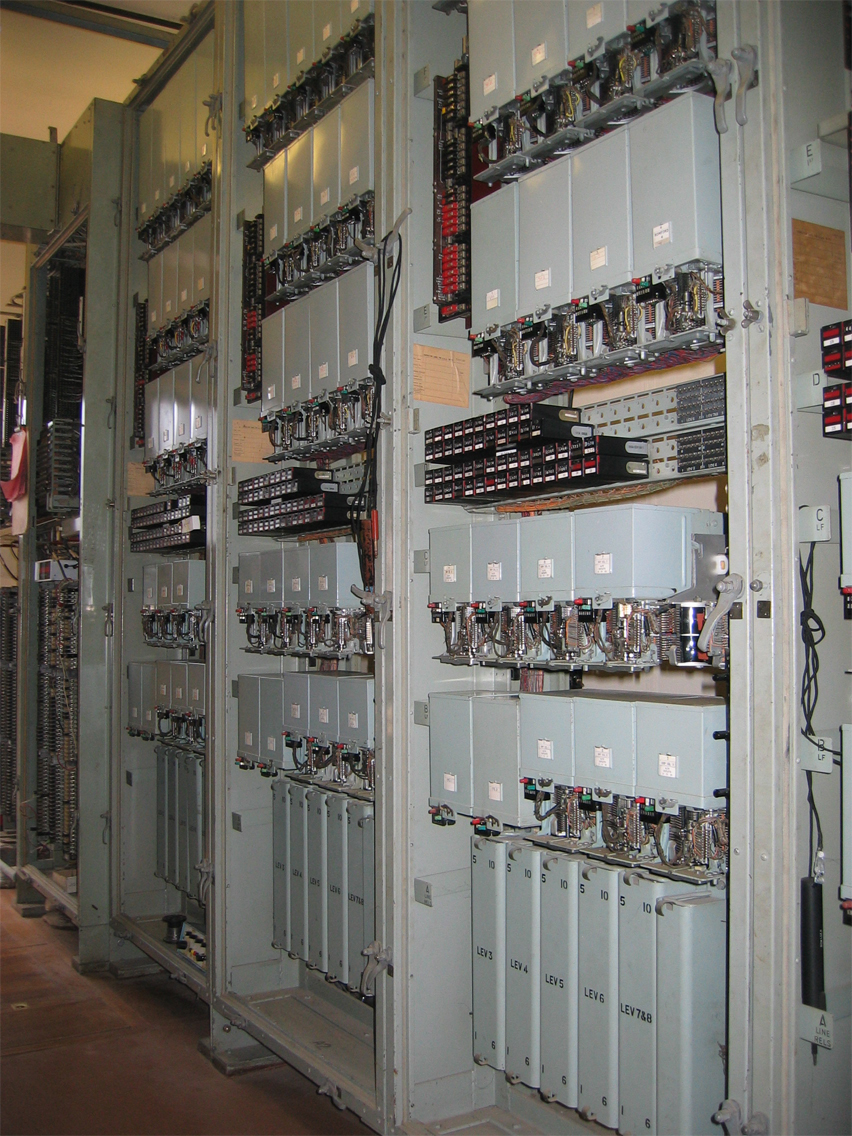
BT's last Strowger electromechanical exchange

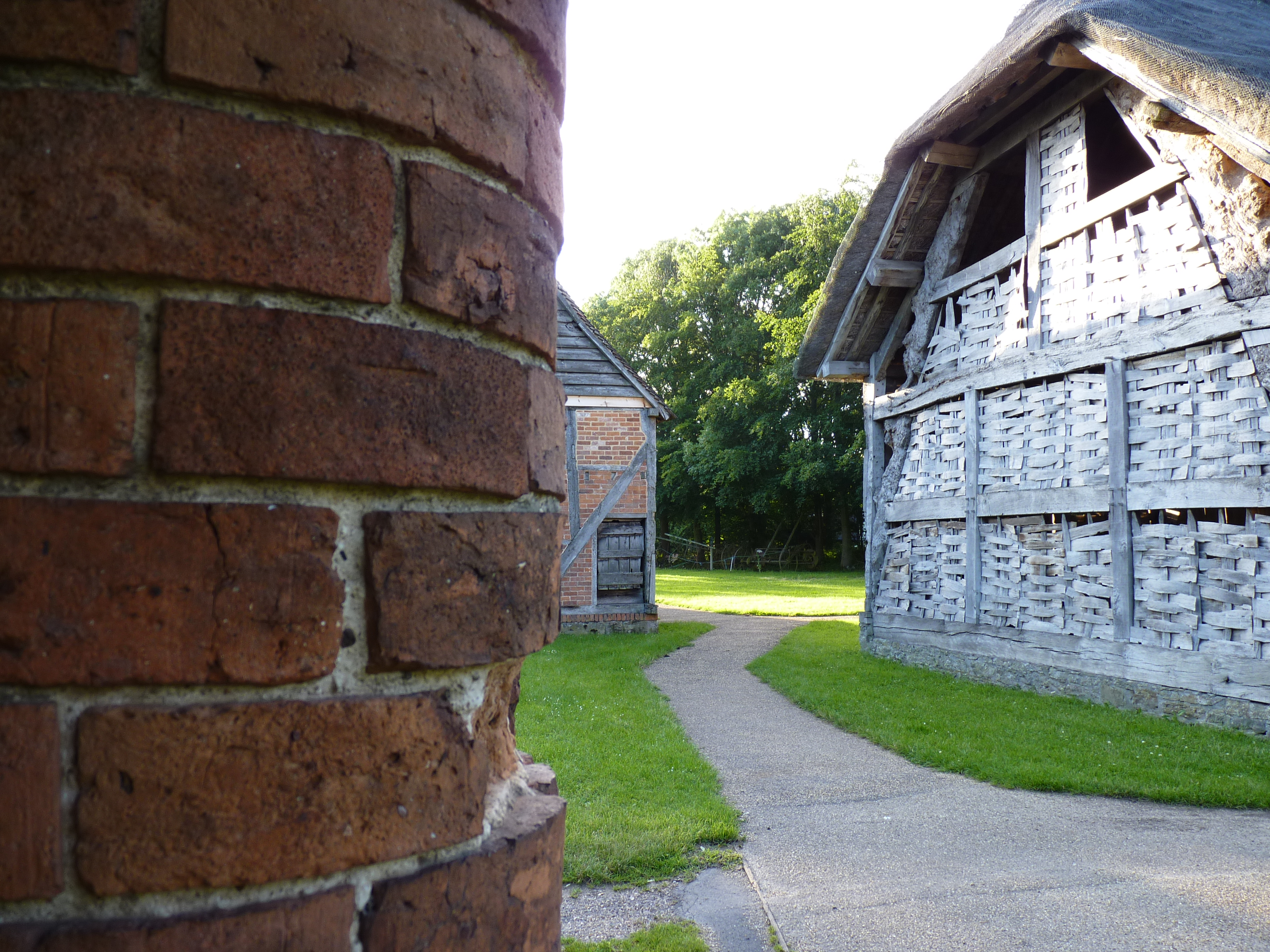
Agricultural buildings at Avoncroft
