= Stoke Prior, Worcestershire =

Village in Worcestershire, England

Coordinates: 52.3025°N 2.0849°W

Stoke Prior
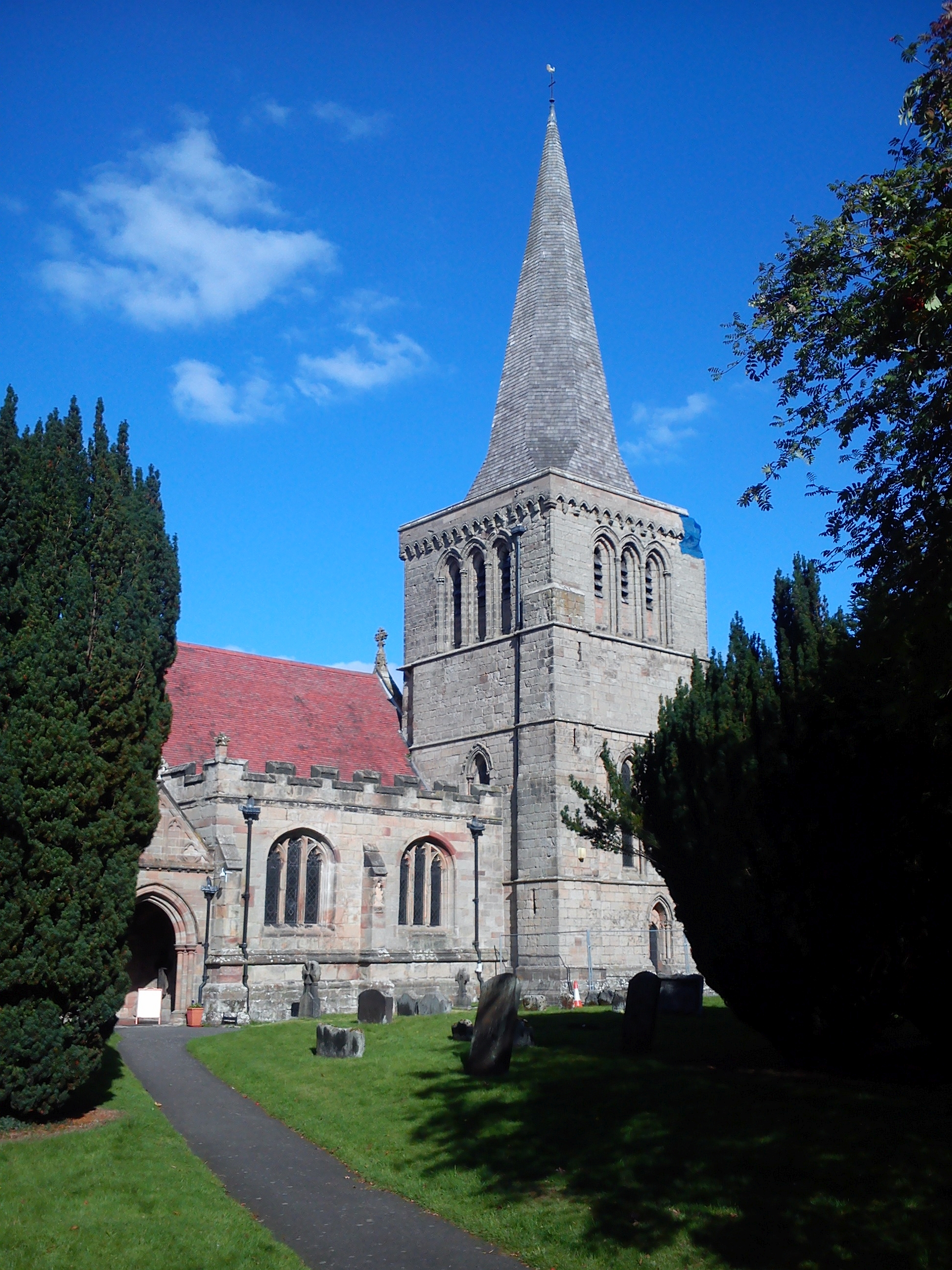
- Church of St Michael, Stoke Prior

- Location within Worcestershire
- Population: 4,559 (parish) (2001 census)
- OS grid reference: SO946672
- Civil parish: Stoke
- District: Bromsgrove
- Shire county: Worcestershire
- Region: West Midlands
- Country: England
- Sovereign state: United Kingdom
- Post town: Bromsgrove
- Postcode district: B60
- Dialling code: 01527
- Police: West Mercia
- Fire: Hereford and Worcester
- Ambulance: West Midlands

Stoke Prior is a village in the civil parish of Stoke in the Bromsgrove district of Worcestershire. The parish includes the settlement of Stoke Wharf and hamlet of Woodgate, along with neighbouring Stoke Heath.

== History ==
In 1086 Stoke Prior was listed in the Domesday Book as Stoche, in the ancient hundred of Came in Worcestershire. The landlord and tenant-in-chief was the bishop of Worcester St Mary.

When the hundred of Halfshire was formed (probably in the mid-12th century), Stoke Prior was one of three Came manors annexed to the hundred of Oswaldslow.

In the 19th century, Stoke Prior was closely associated with the industrialist John Corbett (mentioned below, by Elliot Collins).

In 1853, after he had sold his share of the family canal business, he purchased disused salt works in Stoke Prior from the British Alkali Company. Corbett brought all the innovations of the Industrial Revolution to mechanise and commercialise the business, soon making his salt workings the largest in Europe and built a great fortune.

The Parish Church of St Michael and All Angels dates from the 12th century.

== Economy ==
The Worcester and Birmingham Canal passes through the parish. In the 19th century, John Corbett turned the salt works in Stoke Prior into one of the largest in Europe. The tall chimney of the Stoke Salt Works was for many years a dominating landmark. Stoke Prior still houses the headquarters of LG Harris Ltd, a paint brush and decorators tool manufacturer (known locally as "Harris Brush" or just "The Brush").

== Steam Rally ==
The Annual Steam Rally takes place on the 3rd weekend of September. The show started in a field behind the Ewe and Lamb Public House and is now hosted on a nearby farm less than a mile from where it first began. Stoke Prior Steam Rally was founded by the late Keith Shakespeare in 1990. Keith had previously organised rallies for the Birmingham Railway Museum and National Traction Engine Trust. Upon his death in 2019 running of the show passed to his daughter Liz who with support from her husband Paul and mother Tracey, continues to organise the rally each year.

The rally, which attracts over 700 exhibits each year, showcases a variety of Steam Engines, Vintage and Classic Vehicles dating from the late 19th Century up to the early 21st Century and Living History Displays

== Defining Factors ==
Running through Stoke Prior are 'Shaw Lane', the primary road of the village, and the Worcester and Birmingham Canal. Furthermore, Stoke Prior First School (rated Good by OFSTED and located on Ryefields Road) is a heavily-considered factor when regarding immigration. Another factor to consider is that of the railway passing through it which can be accessed through nearby villages

== Notable people ==
- Zoë Lister, actress, was born in Stoke Prior.
- John Corbett, the Salt King, buried in the churchyard of St Michaels, Stoke Prior.

== Gallery ==
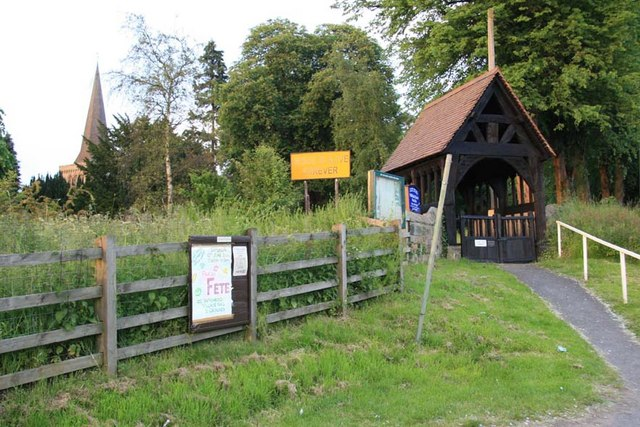
Gate to St Michael's Church

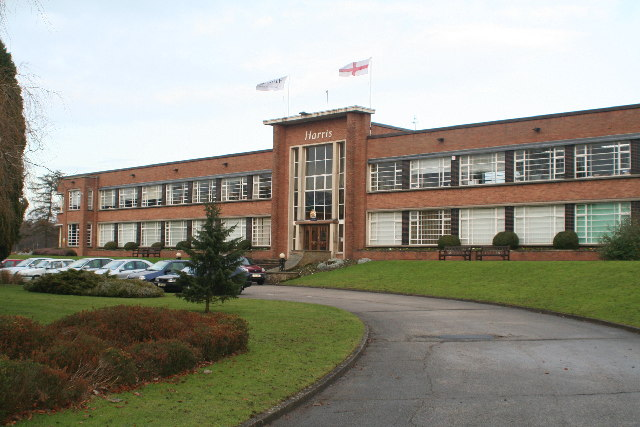
Harris Brush Works

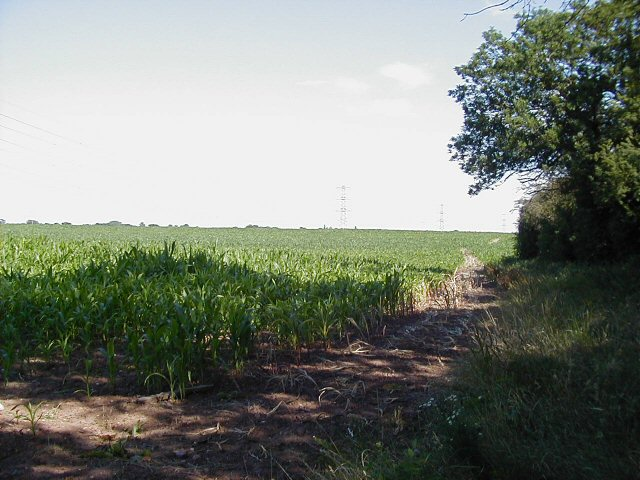
Track in the fields

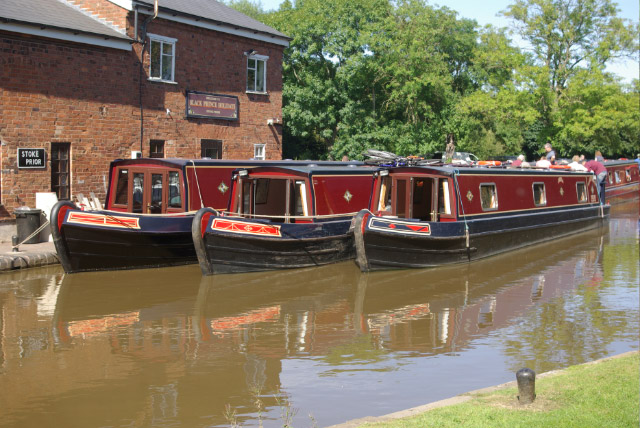
Stoke Prior Wharf
