= Stoked =

Stoked may refer to:

- Stoked (video game), a 2009 snowboarding game
- Stoked (TV series), a 2009–2013 Canadian comedy cartoon
- Stoked: The Rise and Fall of Gator, a 2003 American documentary film
- "Stoked", an instrumental by the Beach Boys from Surfin' U.S.A.
