= Stoke-on-Trent (disambiguation) =

Stoke-on-Trent is a city in Staffordshire, England.

Stoke-on-Trent may also refer to:

- Stoke-upon-Trent, a constituent town of the city of Stoke-on-Trent

== Parliamentary constituencies ==
- Stoke-upon-Trent (UK Parliament constituency), a UK parliamentary constituency that existed between 1832 and 1918
- Stoke-on-Trent, Stoke (UK Parliament constituency), a UK parliamentary constituency that existed between 1918 and 1950
- Burslem (UK Parliament constituency), a UK parliamentary constituency that existed between 1918 and 1950; sometimes referred to as Stoke-on-Trent, Burslem
- Hanley (UK Parliament constituency), a UK parliamentary constituency that existed between 1885 and 1918; known as Stoke-on-Trent, Hanley between 1918 and 1950
- Stoke-on-Trent Central (UK Parliament constituency), a current UK parliamentary constituency existing since 1950
- Stoke-on-Trent North (UK Parliament constituency), a current UK parliamentary constituency existing since 1950
- Stoke-on-Trent South (UK Parliament constituency), a current UK parliamentary constituency existing since 1950
