= Church of St Martin, North Stoke =

Church in North Stoke, Somerset, England

Church of St Martin
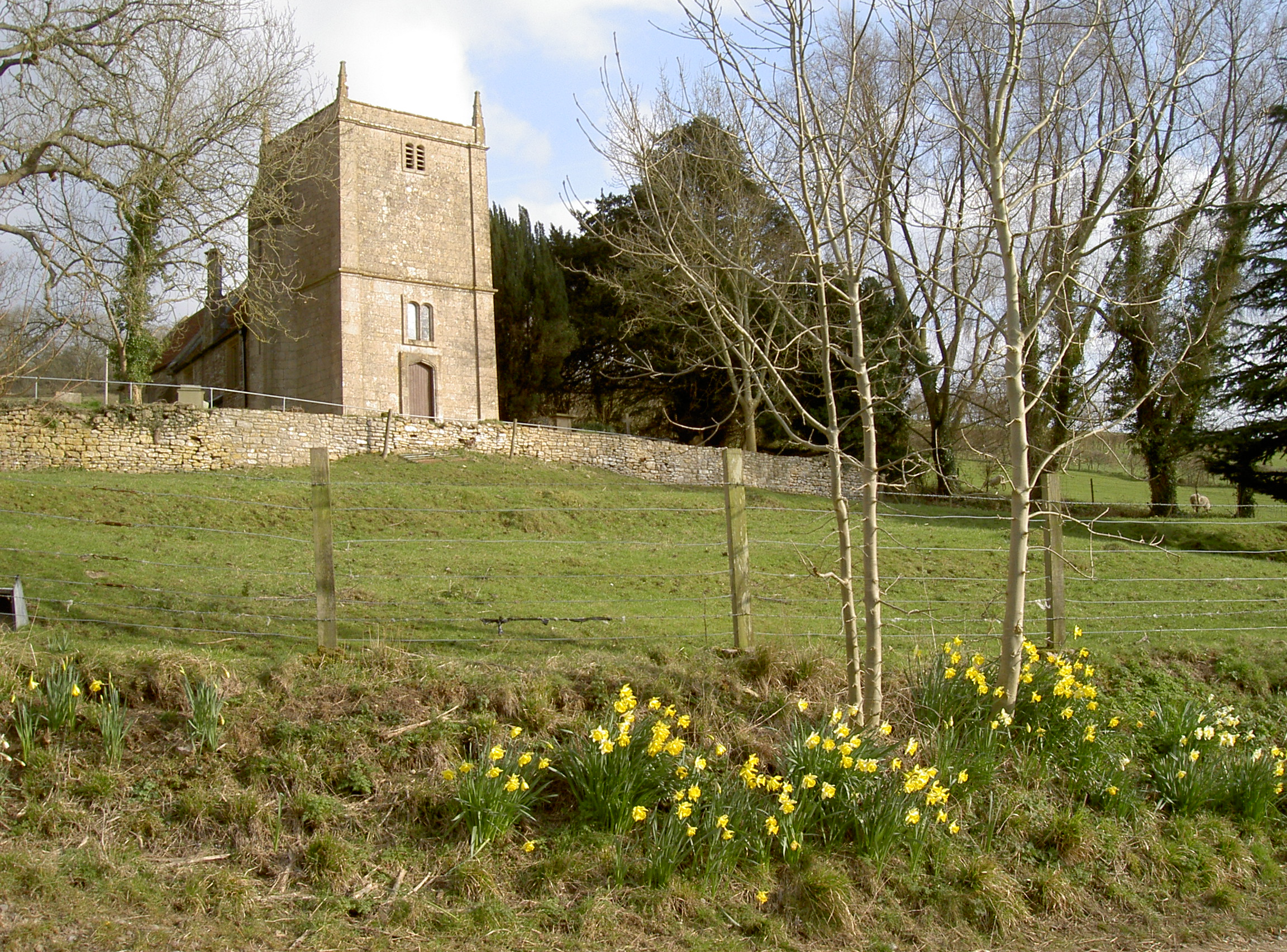

- Location within Somerset
- 51.4203°N 2.4274°W
- Location: North Stoke, Somerset, England

History
- Built: 12th century

Listed Building – Grade II*
- Official name: Church of St Martin
- Designated: 1 February 1956
- Reference no.: 1215229

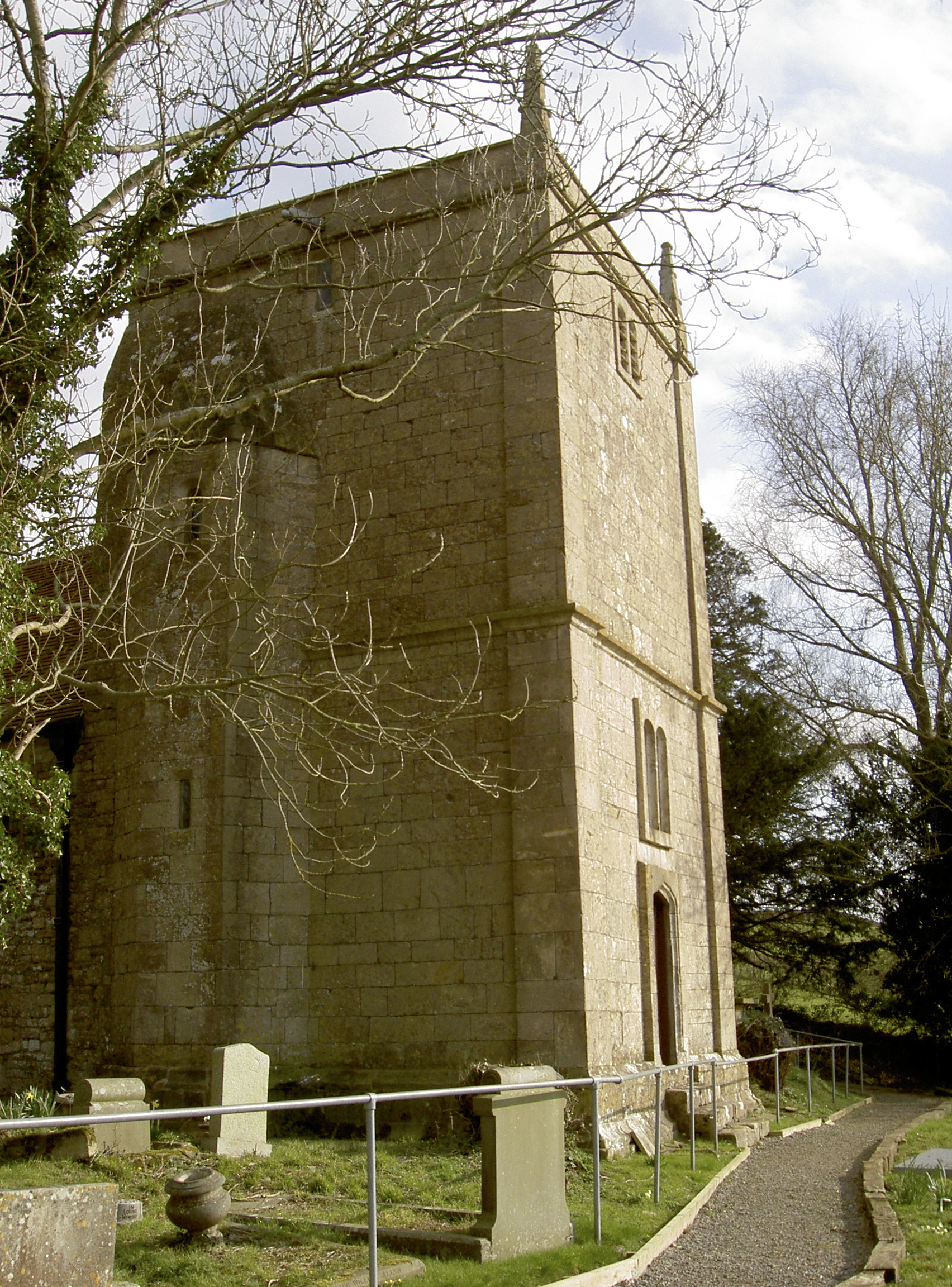
Church tower

The Church of St Martin in North Stoke, Somerset, England dates from the 12th century and is a Grade II* listed building.

== History ==
There is evidence of a church on the site from 360, with that church being built on the site of an earlier Roman temple.

The fabric of the current building started in the 12th century and the two-stage west tower dates from that era. Much of the rest of the building is from the 13th to 16th centuries. Major restoration in the 19th century repaired or replaced much of the fabric. Restoration work in 2012 included rewiring and repairs to the roof.

The parish of North Stoke is part of the benefice of Weston, North Stoke and Langridge.

On 10 January 2021 the church was the venue for BBC Radio 4's Sunday Worship.

== Architecture ==
In addition to the tower there is a nave and chancel with a south porch. Inside the church is a font carved from a sacrificial altar. There are also monuments from the 18th century.

In the churchyard is an ancient yew tree.

== See also ==
- List of ecclesiastical parishes in the Diocese of Bath and Wells
