= North Stoke, Somerset =

Village in Somerset, England

Coordinates: 51.4202°N 2.4301°W

North Stoke
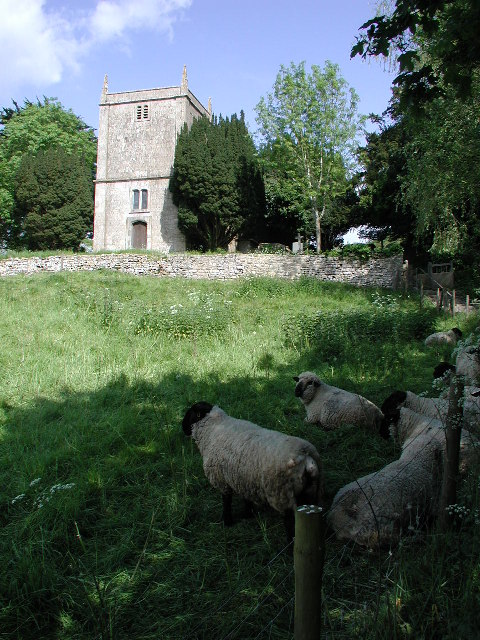
- Church of St Martin, North Stoke

- Location within Somerset
- Population: 72
- OS grid reference: ST701691
- Unitary authority: Bath and North East Somerset
- Ceremonial county: Somerset
- Region: South West
- Country: England
- Sovereign state: United Kingdom
- Post town: Bath
- Postcode district: BA1
- Dialling code: 01225
- Police: Avon and Somerset
- Fire: Avon
- Ambulance: South Western
- UK Parliament: Bath

North Stoke is a village within the civil parish of North Stoke in the Bath and North East Somerset (BANES) unitary authority within the historic county of Somerset, England, and close to the border with South Gloucestershire. The parish has a population of 72.

== History ==
North Stoke was part of the hundred of Bath Forum.

== Governance ==
The parish meeting has responsibility for local issues, including setting an annual precept (local rate) to cover the council's operating costs and producing annual accounts for public scrutiny. North Stoke is the only parish in BANES which doesn't charge a precept. The parish council evaluates local planning applications and works with the local police, district council officers, and neighbourhood watch groups on matters of crime, security, and traffic. The parish council's role also includes initiating projects for the maintenance and repair of parish facilities, such as the village hall or community centre, playing fields and playgrounds, as well as consulting with the district council on the maintenance, repair, and improvement of highways, drainage, footpaths, public transport, and street cleaning. Conservation matters (including trees and listed buildings) and environmental issues are also of interest to the council.

The parish falls within the unitary authority of Bath and North East Somerset which was created in 1996, as established by the Local Government Act 1992. It provides a single tier of local government with responsibility for almost all local government functions within their area including local planning and building control, local roads, council housing, environmental health, markets and fairs, refuse collection, recycling, cemeteries, crematoria, leisure services, parks, and tourism. They are also responsible for education, social services, libraries, main roads, public transport, trading standards, waste disposal and strategic planning, although fire, police and ambulance services are provided jointly with other authorities through the Avon Fire and Rescue Service, Avon and Somerset Constabulary and the Great Western Ambulance Service.

Bath and North East Somerset's area covers part of the ceremonial county of Somerset but it is administered independently of the non-metropolitan county. Its administrative headquarters are in Bath. Between 1 April 1974 and 1 April 1996, it was the Wansdyke district and the City of Bath of the county of Avon. Before 1974 that the parish was part of the Bathavon Rural District.

The parish is represented in the House of Commons of the Parliament of the United Kingdom as part of the Bath constituency. It elects one Member of Parliament (MP) by the first past the post system of election.

== Religious sites ==
The Church of St Martin dates from the 12th century and has been designated by English Heritage as a grade II* listed building.

== Notable residents ==
- Patrick Seager Hill, T.D. (1915–2010), who was a British clothing manufacturer, and a pioneer and developer of safety and fire protective clothing.
- Lawrence baronets, of Lucknow (1858), whose family plaque is located in St Martin's Church, North Stoke.
- Anthony Bridgman (1915-2006), bomber pilot in World War II
