= Stoke railway station =

Stoke railway station may refer to:

- Stoke railway station, New Zealand, a former station in Stoke, south of Nelson
- Stoke railway station (Suffolk), a former station in Stoke-by-Clare, England
- Stoke-on-Trent railway station, a mainline railway station serving the city of Stoke-on-Trent, England
