= Stoker (surname) =

Stoker is a surname.

Those bearing it include:

- Amanda Stoker (born 1982), Australian politician
- Austin Stoker (1930–2022), Trinidadian-American actor
- Bob Stoker, Northern Ireland politician, Lord Mayor of Belfast (1999–2000)
- Bram Stoker (1847–1912), Irish writer
- Charlotte Stoker (1818-1901), activist and mother of Bram Stoker
- Don Stoker (1922–1985), English football player and manager
- Donald Stoker (historian), American military historian
- Frank Stoker (1867–1939), Irish tennis and rugby union player
- Gareth Stoker (born 1973), English footballer
- Gerry Stoker (born 1955), British political scientist
- Gordon Stoker, pianist and singer with The Jordanaires
- Hendrik G. Stoker (1899–1993), South African Calvinist philosopher
- Henry Hugh Gordon Stoker (1885–1966), Irish Royal Navy officer and actor also known as Dacre Stoker
- James J. Stoker (1905–1992), American mathematician
- Joanne Stoker (born 1983/84), British footwear designer
- Joscelyn Eve Stoker (born 1987, stage name Joss Stone, English singer, songwriter and actress
- Lewis Stoker (1910–1979), English footballer
- Mary Stoker Smith (born 1969), reporter and anchor for KYW-TV in Philadelphia
- Michael Stoker (1918–2013), British physician and researcher
- Richard Stoker (1938–2021), British composer and writer
- Robert Burdon Stoker (1859–1919), British shipping magnate and politician
- Thornley Stoker, 1st Baronet (1845–1912), Irish surgeon, brother of Bram Stoker
- Will Stoker, singer and musician with Will Stoker and the Embers
