= Langridge =

Langridge is a surname. Notable people with the surname include:

- Albert Kent Langridge, known as A. K. Langridge (late 19th – early 20th centuries), English author, wrote about missions to South Seas islands
- Chris Langridge (born 1985), English badminton player
- George Langridge (1829–1891), politician in Victoria, Australia
- James Langridge (1906–1966), English cricketer
- John Langridge (disambiguation), several people
- Matt Langridge (born 1983), English oarsman
- Philip Langridge (1939–2010), English operatic tenor
- Richard Langridge (1939–2005), English cricketer
- Roger Langridge (born 1967), New Zealand-born comics writer and artist
- Stuart Langridge (born 1976), English software designer
- Ted Langridge (born 1936), Australian rules footballer
- Joe Langridge-Brown (born 1990), English guitarist for Nothing But Thieves

== See also ==
- Langridge, Somerset, England
- Langridge, a ward of the City of Yarra, Victoria, Australia
- Langrage, a type of Naval artillery in the Age of Sail
