= William Ockley =

Alleged assassin of King Edward II of England

William Ockley (died after October 1330), also spelled Ockle or Ogle, was a 14th-century English man-at-arms. He is considered to be one of the alleged murderers of King Edward II, who died in mysterious circumstances in captivity shortly after his deposition in 1327. Condemned for regicide by King Edward III in 1330, Ockley has left no trace after that date and his subsequent fate remains unknown.

== Biography ==
William Ockley was originally a man-at-arms for the powerful Welsh Marches baron Roger Mortimer. Following Mortimer's failed rebellion against King Edward II in January 1322, Ockley entered the service of his wife, Joan de Geneville, whose property had been sequestered by the king. He accompanied her to Southampton on 4 March 1322.

Ockley may have had Irish connections, as he administered several lands there for his relative Stephen Ockley in March 1326, and some of his possessions were restored to him in 1327.

In the autumn of 1326, Roger Mortimer overthrew King Edward II, assisted by Edward's wife, Queen Isabella. On 3 April 1327, he entrusted John Maltravers and Thomas de Berkeley with the custody of Edward II, who had been deposed by Parliament the previous January. The deposed king was imprisoned at Berkeley Castle, but was frequently moved from castle to castle by his captors to make any attempts at his rescue more difficult.

Edward was eventually brought back to Berkeley, where he apparently died on 21 September. Many suspected Mortimer of having ordered the assassination of the deposed monarch. Ockley was soon considered one of his possible assassins, along with John Maltravers and Thomas Gurney, as he was said to have been mysteriously sent to Berkeley by Mortimer shortly after the discovery of a new plot to rescue the deposed monarch in early September 1327. However, there is no evidence that Edward II was assassinated, or even that he managed to secretly escape from his prison to live in exile incognito, as several chroniclers later suggested.

On 19 October 1330, the new King Edward III had Roger Mortimer arrested and his supporters hunted down. Mortimer, executed on 29 November, was accused at his trial, among other things, of having ordered the death of Edward II. For the first time, the death of the previous monarch was officially described as murder, although his jailers had previously maintained that he had died of natural causes. William Ockley, accused of having participated in the assassination of the former sovereign, immediately had a price put on his head of 40 pounds or 100 marks. First sentenced to death in absentia by Parliament on 3 December 1330, the charges against him for his participation in the death of Edward II were confirmed during a new trial in March 1331. However, Ockley disappears from the records following Mortimer's arrest and his fate thereafter remains entirely unknown.

Diplomatic documents show that in 1338 Edward III visited Koblenz and met a man named Guillaume le Galeys (William the Welshman), who claimed to be his father, Edward II. Some historians believe that this man was actually William Ockley. Paul C. Doherty, who draws heavily on the "Fieschi Letter", written around 1336, claims that Edward II actually escaped from Berkeley in 1327 with the help of Ockley, who then travelled around Europe under the name William the Welshman to distract the deposed monarch. Claiming to be the father of the King of England would have been risky, however, and William's fate after 1338 is unknown.

== Media ==
William Ockley is a minor character in Maurice Druon's historical drama series of novels The Accursed Kings (Les Rois maudits). Druon claims, however, that Ockley was a barber at the Tower of London and helped Roger Mortimer escape in August 1323, a claim that is not corroborated by any source. Druon also spreads the myth that Edward II was killed by his captors by having a red-hot iron inserted into his anus, which would have had the benefit of making the deposed ruler's death appear natural. William Ockley is portrayed by François Darbon in a television adaptation screened by ORTF in 1972.

== Sources ==
- Haines, Roy Martin (2003). "Sir Thomas Gurney of Englishcombe in the County of Somerset, Regicide?". Proceedings of the Somerset Archaeological and Natural History Society (147). Somerset Archaeological and Natural History Society.
- Mortimer, Ian (2003). The Greatest Traitor. The Life of Sir Roger Mortimer, Ruler of England 1327–1330. London: Pimlico. ISBN 0-7126-9715-2.
- Phillips, Seymour (2010). Edward II. New Haven: Yale University Press. ISBN 978-0-300-15657-7.
