= John Corbett (industrialist) =

English industrialist, philanthropist and Liberal politician

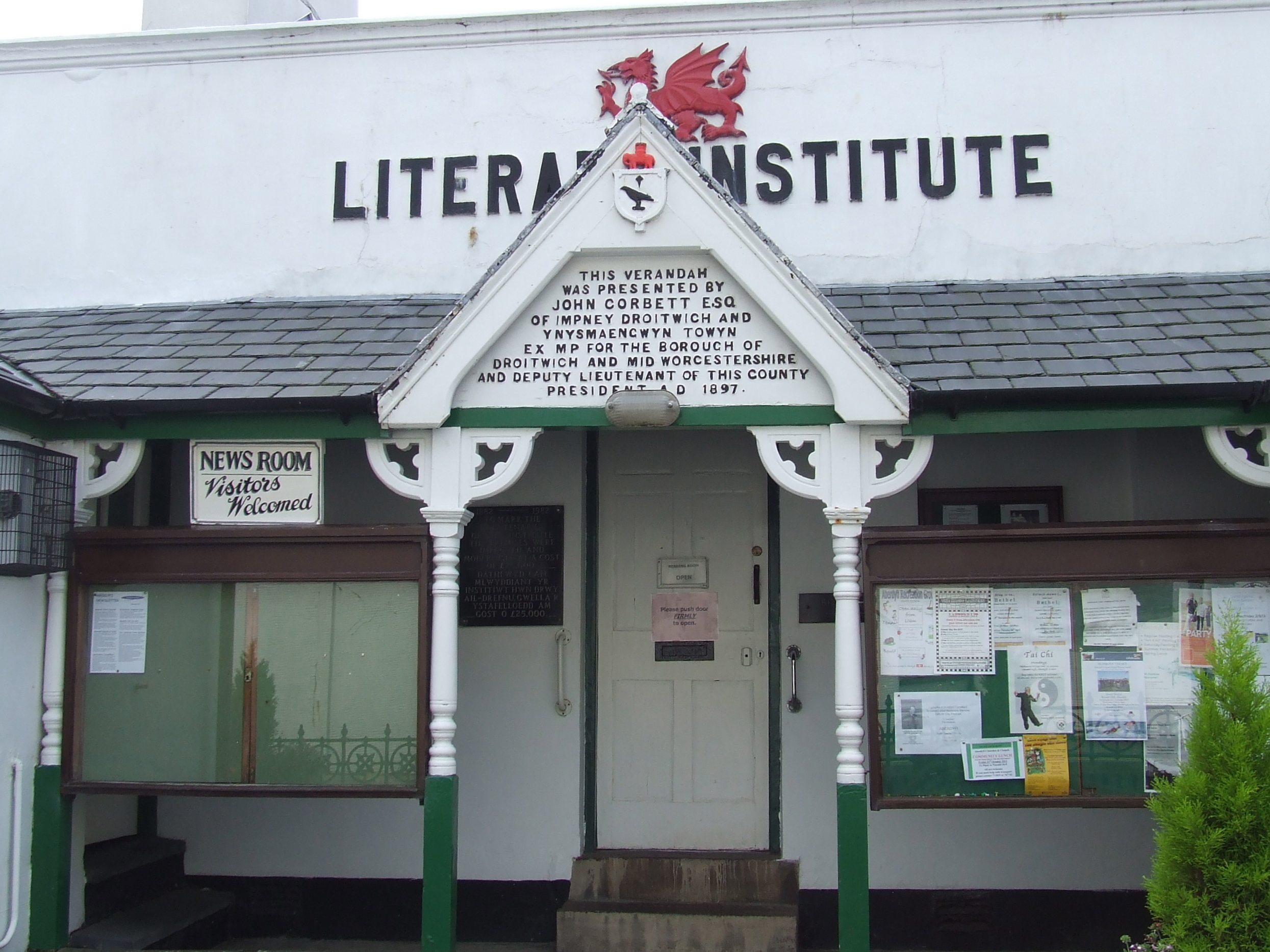
John Corbett is remembered with an inscription on the front of the Literary Institute in Aberdyfi, Gwynedd

John Corbett (bapt. 29 June 1817 – 22 April 1901) was an English industrialist, philanthropist, and Liberal and Liberal Unionist politician of the Victorian era. He is particularly associated with the salt industry in Stoke Prior and Droitwich Spa, Worcestershire. Locally he was nicknamed The Salt King.

== Family background ==
Corbett was born in Brierley Hill, Staffordshire, where his father, Joseph Corbett, ran a successful canal transport business. John joined the family business but by 1850 canals were facing increasing competition from the new and expanding railways.

== Foresight ==
John Corbett sold his share of the family canal business and, in 1853, purchased disused salt workings in Stoke Prior from the British Alkali Company. Corbett brought all the innovations of the Industrial Revolution to mechanise and commercialise the business, soon making his salt workings the largest in Europe and built a great fortune.

== Philanthropy ==
Corbett did not use his fortune only for himself: he chose to reinvest profits into his business, innovating, improving his workforce's working conditions, raising wages. His workers were so well paid, for the time, that many could boast that their wives did not need to work at all.

In December 1891, Corbett bought a rundown house near his birthplace, The Hill in Amblecote, which he repaired and refurbished, changing its use into a hospital, endowed it to the local people on 31 July 1893 as Corbett Hospital, with a sum of £2,000 for endowment (increased by public subscription to £5,000) and two sums of £500 towards the repairs fund and furnishing. John Corbett never lived at The Hill.

== Politics ==
He was elected at the 1874 general election as Member of Parliament (MP) for the Droitwich, having unsuccessfully contested the seat in 1868. He was re-elected at three subsequent general elections, joining the breakaway Liberal Unionists when the Liberal Party split in 1886 over Home Rule for Ireland. Corbett retired from the House of Commons at the 1892 general election.

== Marriage ==
In 1855 he met his future wife Hanna O'Meara in Paris. She lived in Paris with her Irish father and mother. He married her within a year of meeting her. They had six children together.

She missed her elegant Parisian lifestyle and the French upbringing she had enjoyed so Corbett had a French style chateau built to assuage her homesickness, completed in 1875 for the staggering cost, at the time, of £247,000. Chateau Impney still stands today, as a well-known landmark just outside Droitwich Spa.

They separated after nearly thirty years of marriage.

== Retirement ==
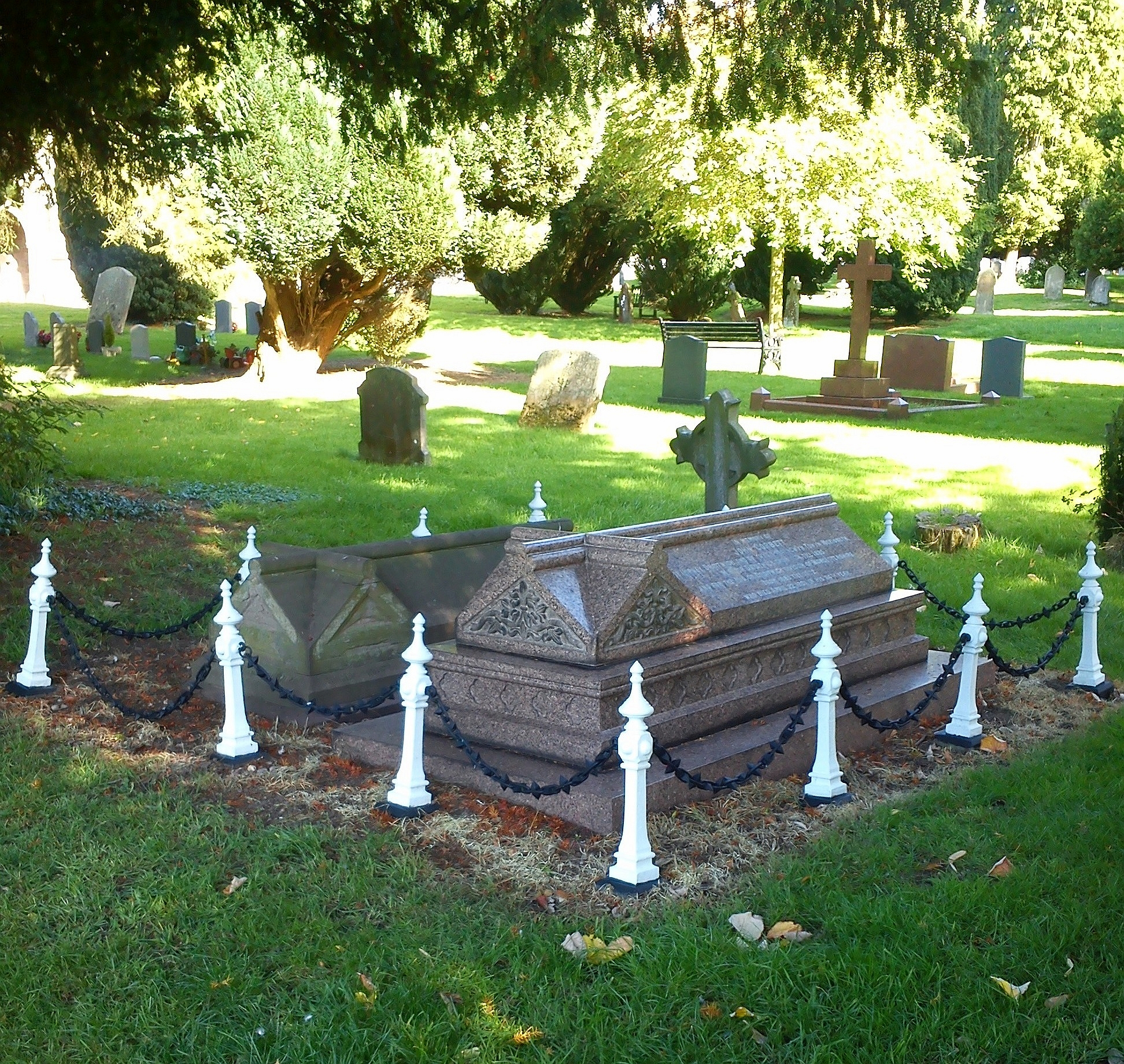
Stoke Prior, Worcestershire: Graves of Thomas and John Corbett in the churchyard of St Michael's Church

In 1888, he sold the massive salt business to the Salt Union Ltd for GBP £660,000 (equivalent to £50 million in 2007). He spent much of the proceeds in philanthropic work in and around Droitwich Spa, buying St. Andrew's House and turning it into the Raven Hotel. At the end of the 19th century, he presented a veranda to the Aberdovey literary institute.

He died on 22 April 1901 and was buried in the churchyard of St Michaels, Stoke Prior, Worcestershire.

== Notes ==
Parliament of the United Kingdom
Preceded by Sir John Pakington	Member of Parliament for Droitwich; 1874 – 1892	Succeeded by Richard Biddulph Martin
