= Stoke Heath, Worcestershire =

Area of Bromsgrove, England

Coordinates: 52.318133°N 2.073841°W

Stoke Heath
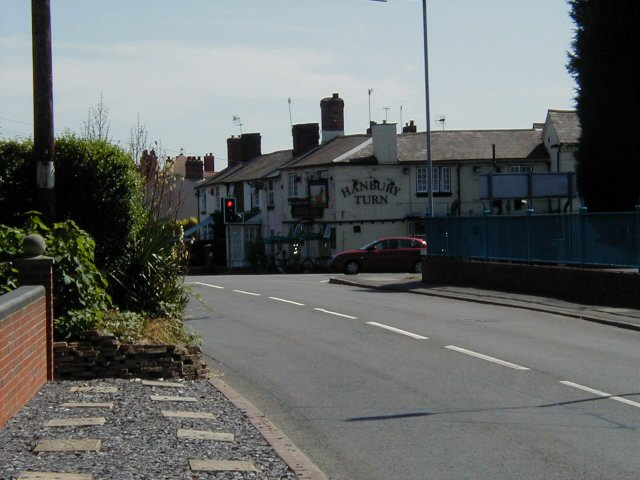
- Hanbury Turn

- Location within Worcestershire
- OS grid reference: SO950688
- Civil parish: Stoke
- District: Bromsgrove
- Shire county: Worcestershire
- Region: West Midlands
- Country: England
- Sovereign state: United Kingdom
- Post town: BROMSGROVE
- Postcode district: B60
- Dialling code: 01527
- Police: West Mercia
- Fire: Hereford and Worcester
- Ambulance: West Midlands
- UK Parliament: Bromsgrove

Stoke Heath is an area in the south of Bromsgrove, Worcestershire, England.

Originally a small village near Bromsgrove, it has been absorbed into Bromsgrove by new housing developments since the 1980s. These developments hold many of the commuters that have made Bromsgrove into a dormitory town; it is within commuting distance of both Birmingham and Worcester.

Stoke Heath is home to the Avoncroft Museum of Historic Buildings.
