= Paul Frampton =

English physicist (born 1943)

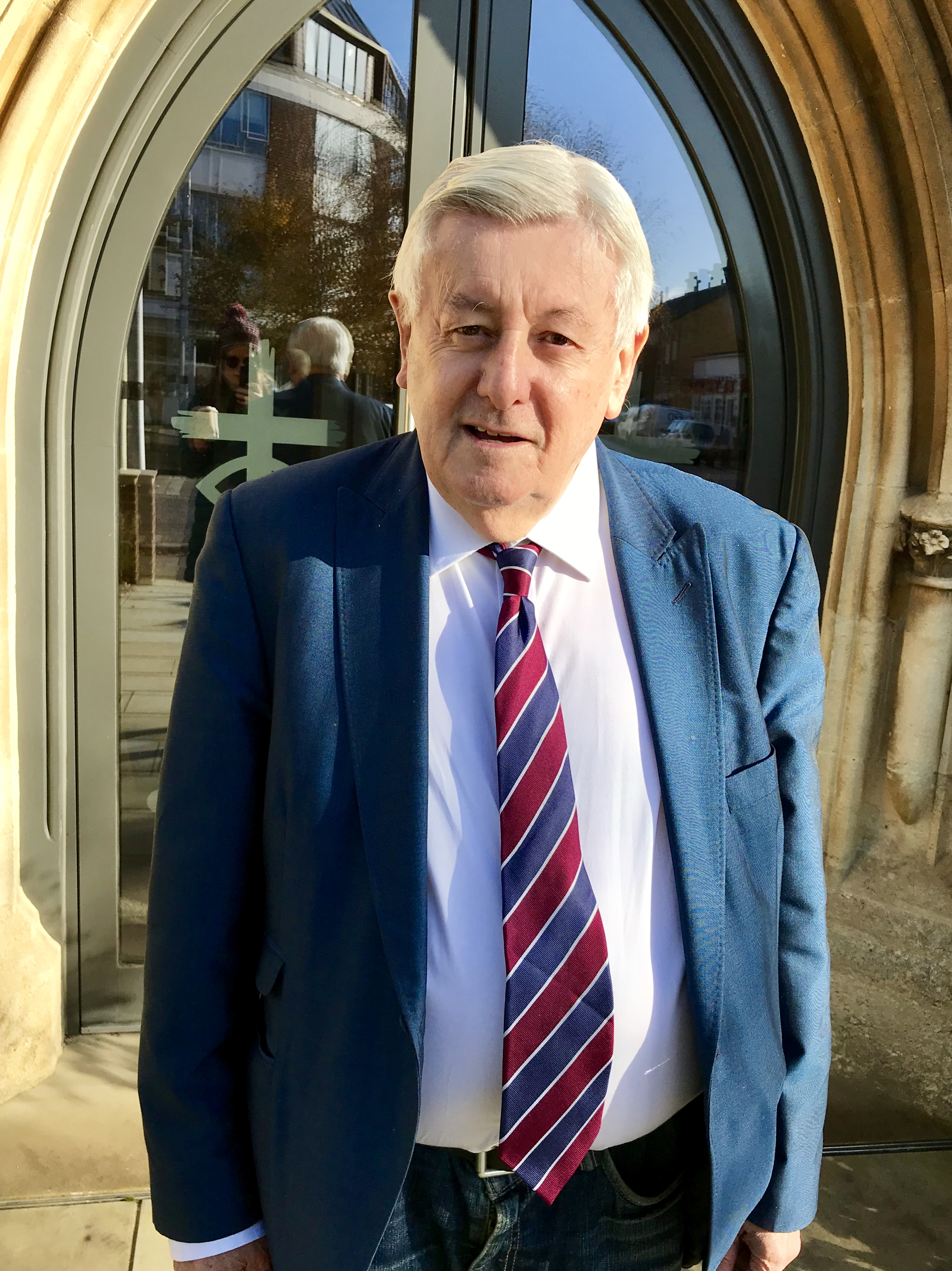
- Frampton in 2020
- Born: Kidderminster, England
- Education: University of Oxford
- Known for: Bilepton
- Scientific career
- Fields: Particle theory
- Workplaces: UNC-Chapel Hill; University of Salento
- Doctoral advisor: J.C. Taylor

Paul Howard Frampton is an English theoretical physicist who works in particle theory and cosmology. From 1996 until 2014, he was the Louis D. Rubin, Jr. Distinguished Professor of physics and astronomy at the University of North Carolina at Chapel Hill. After a well-publicised hiatus involving being victimised by a romance scam, convicted of drug smuggling in Argentina, and fired by UNC (in which he won a lawsuit for wrongful termination), he later became affiliated with the Department of Mathematics and Physics of the University of Salento, in Italy.

== Early life ==
Born in Kidderminster, England, Frampton attended King Charles I School from 1954 to 1962 and then Brasenose College, Oxford from 1962 to 1968. He received the degrees of BA (double first) in 1965, MA, DPhil in 1968 and DSc in 1984, all from the University of Oxford.

== Career ==
He is a Fellow of the American Association for the Advancement of Science (1990) and the American Physical Society (1981). In 1987, he was the project director for siting the Superconducting Supercollider, in North Carolina. A Festschrift was published for his 60th birthday in 2003.

His DPhil thesis analysed the relationship between current algebra and superconvergence sum rules, and contained a 1967 sum rule. In 1970, he analysed the absence of ghosts in the dual resonance model.

Three examples of his model building are the chiral color model, in 1987, which predicts axigluons; the 331 model, in 1992, which can explain the number of quark-lepton generations, and predicts bileptons; and his proposal, in 1995, of the binary tetrahedral group as a flavor symmetry. All three serve as targets of opportunity for the Large Hadron Collider (LHC). In 2002, he built a model relating matter–antimatter asymmetry in the early universe to measurements possible on Earth. In 2015, he showed that the 331-model predicts long-lived quarks accessible to Run 2 of the LHC.

In formal directions, three examples are that he calculated, in 1976, the rate of vacuum decay in quantum field theory; in 1982, he analysed ten-dimensional gauge field theory, and its hexagon anomaly, precursor to the first superstring revolution; and in 1988, he constructed the Lagrangian which describes the dynamics of the p-adic string.

For cosmology, two examples are, in 2007, he built a cyclic model, which can solve a 75-year-old entropy problem; and in 2010, he discussed how dark energy may be better understood by studying temperature and entropy. In 2015, he demonstrated how cyclic entropy can lead to flat geometry without an inflationary era and estimated the time until contraction to be close to one hundred times the present age of the universe. In 2015, he also proposed a novel theory of dark matter, where the dark matter constituents are primordial black holes with many solar masses.

In 2022, he published the idea that the accelerated cosmologicial expansion is caused by Coulomb repulsion between like-sign electrically-charged Primordial Extremely Massive Black Holes (PEMBHs).

=== Drug smuggling conviction ===
In January 2012, Frampton was arrested at a Buenos Aires airport after checking in a bag containing two kilograms of cocaine hidden in the lining. That November, Frampton was convicted of drug smuggling in Argentina and was sentenced to four years and eight months in detention. He said that he was a victim of a romance scam, and that he was tricked into transporting the suitcase. While in prison, Frampton was diagnosed with schizoid personality disorder by a forensic psychologist hired by his legal team, a condition that Frampton says makes him gullible and more susceptible to such a scam.

Soon after his arrest, his pay was stopped and he was placed on personal leave; the move was widely criticised by the academic community. He was fired from his UNC post in 2014. On 16 June 2015, an appeals court in North Carolina unanimously ruled that his university violated its own policies by placing Frampton on unpaid leave while he awaited trial, and ordered the university to restore Frampton's back salary and benefits. Frampton's account of these events was published in 2014.

Under Argentine law, a foreign national can be released from prison and deported after serving half of his or her sentence. Frampton was granted such release and returned to England in 2015, agreeing never to return to Argentina.

=== Subsequent work ===
Since his return to England, Frampton has continued to author physics papers. These include A new direction for dark matter research: intermediate-mass compact halo objects (2016), Exploring scalar and vector bileptons at the LHC in a 331 model (2018), and Electromagnetic accelerating universe (2022).

In 2023, he expanded the explanation of this novel cosmological model and showed the internal consistency when there is no dark energy but only charged dark matter.

== Publications ==
Frampton's first publication was Chirality Commutator and Vector Mesons, in 1967. He has published more than 500 articles on particle theory and cosmology. He is the author of a book on string theory, in 1974 (2nd edition, 1986), when it was still named the dual resonance model. In 1986, he published a book on quantum field theory (2nd edition 2000, 3rd edition 2008). A book on cyclic cosmology, for the general public, was published in 2009. A book on the history of particle theory was published in 2020.
