= Noah Cooke =

Noah Cooke (8 March 1831 – February 1919) was an English poet known as "The Weaver Poet". He was born in Kidderminster, Worcestershire, the son of a journeyman weaver. Cooke followed his father into the weaving industry, and he eventually became a carpet weaver in his home town. At the time, about half of the town's population was connected with the carpet industry. He was also involved in the local trade union.

Cooke was encouraged to start writing poetry in the 1850s by his brother-in-law Benjamin Riley, who was a writer. From 1870, Cooke's works appeared frequently in the "Poet's Corner" section of the Kidderminster Shuttle. He published a collection of poems in 1876 under the title Wild Warblings. Although he wrote hundreds of poems, no other collections were published.

Most of Cooke's poems are short, although he did write a few longer poems, such as the religious poem "Life", which was printed privately in 1916. The main theme of his works was nature, although he also wrote about the weaving industry and the working conditions of other labourers. His works were intended to be read by a working-class audience. Nothing is known about Cooke's process of composition, although it has been suggested that he created lines of poetry while he worked.

Cooke's poetry generally only reached a local audience, where he was well known, and he was known locally as "The Weaver Poet". He gained some national attention by contributing poems to labour publications.

Cooke died in Kidderminster in 1919, aged 88.
