= William Edward Wadely =

British composer (1855–1943)

William Edward Wadely FRCO (4 December 1855 – 25 April 1943) was an organist and composer based in England. He achieved the remarkable record of being organist at St John’s Church, Kidderminster, Worcestershire, for 66 years.

== Life ==
Wadely was born on 4 December 1855 in Worcester, the son of Frederick Gibbs Wadeley and Ann Hobro.

At age 10, he went to Kidderminster as a member of the Christie Minstrels, in the care of William Ball, father of the famous music hall star, Miss Vesta Tilley, the male impersonator, afterwards Lady de Freece.

He married Zoe Gilbert in 1879 and they had the following children:

- Frederick William Wadely (1882 - 1970, organist of Carlisle Cathedral)
- Zoe May Wadely (1882 - 1973, teacher at the Midland School of Music in Birmingham)
- Harold Edward Wadely (1884 - 1978, president of the Firth Carpet Company in New York)
- Gilbert Wadely (1886 - 1894)

He grew up in Worcester and learned organ at Worcester Cathedral and studied under Edward Spray alongside Edward Elgar.

He was Kidderminster Borough Organist for 27 years. He died on Easter Day 1943.

== Appointments ==
- Organist of St. Michael's Church, Worcester ???? - 1872
- Organist of St. George's Church, Worcester 1872 - ????
- Organist of All Saints' Church, Worcester ???? - 1876
- Assistant organist of Worcester Cathedral ???? - 1876
- Organist of St. Editha's Church, Tamworth 1876 - 1877
- Organist of St. John's Church, Kidderminster 1877 - 1943

== Compositions ==
He composed works for choir and organ.
