= Ernest Perry =

Ernest Perry may refer to:

- Ernest Perry (politician) (1910–1998), British politician
- Ernest Perry (footballer) (1891–1979), English footballer
- Ernest Perry (cricketer) (1908–1996), English cricketer
