= St John's Church, Kidderminster =

Coordinates: 52°23′12.8″N 2°15′39.25″W

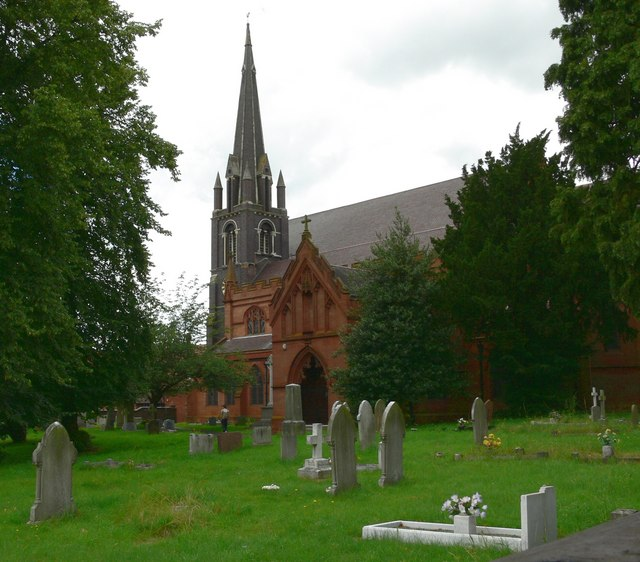
- The Church of St John the Baptist, Kidderminster
- St John's Church, Kidderminster
- OS grid reference: SO 82319 76585
- Location: Kidderminster
- Country: England
- Denomination: Church of England
- Churchmanship: Modern Catholic

History
- Dedication: St John the Baptist

Architecture
- Heritage designation: Grade II listed
- Architect: George Alexander
- Groundbreaking: 1842
- Completed: 1843

Administration
- Diocese: Diocese of Worcester
- Archdeaconry: Archdeaconry of Dudley
- Deanery: Kidderminster Deanery
- Parish: Kidderminster West Team Ministry

Clergy
- Rector: Currently Vacant

St John's Church, Kidderminster is a Church of England parish church in Kidderminster, Worcestershire, England. The church is a Grade II listed building.

== History ==
The first St John the Baptist Church was built between 1842 and 1843 to designs by the architect George Alexander. It was known locally as the 'Black Church'. It was created as a parish in 1867 out of that of St Mary and All Saints' Church, Kidderminster.

The present church was rebuilt between 1892 and 1904 by J. A. Chatwin and incorporated the tower and spire of the earlier church, and was consecrated by the Bishop of Worcester Charles Gore on 13 February 1904.

In 1972 offices and vestries were constructed within the nave by Burman Goodall & Partners. The refectory and children's room were added then and the organ was moved to the west end of the nave over the refectory.

== Vicars ==
- Revd Melsup Hill 1844 - 1857
- Revd George Kewley 1858 - 1882
- Canon John Kershaw 1882 - 1911
- Revd R. Stephenson 1911 - 1920
- Revd R. Bertie Roberts 1920 - 1936
- Revd J.H. Balmforth 1937 - 1943
- Canon Hugh Roberts 1943 - 1952
- Revd Arthur Trippass 1952 - 1960
- Revd Anthony Balmforth 1960 - 1966
- Revd Alan Doyle 1966 - 1967
- Revd Derek Barratt 1967 - 1978
- Revd M H Stagg 1978 - 1980
- Revd F. Hillebrand 1980 - 1991 (team rector from 1990)
- Revd Charles Raven 1990 - 2000
- Revd G. Smith 1991 - 2000
- Revd H Goddard 2000 - 2009
- Revd D. Arnold 2009 - 2014
- Fr Tim Williams 2015 - 2025
- Currently in vacancy

== Organ ==
The organ dates from 1909 by Nicholson and Co. of Worcester. A specification of the organ can be found on the National Pipe Organ Register.

=== Organists ===
- William Taylor until 1868 (afterwards organist at St Mary and All Saints' Church, Kidderminster)
- George Arthur Hardacre 1868 - 1869
- G.E. Blunden 1869 - 1877
- William Edward Wadely 1877 - 1943 (formerly organist at Tamworth Parish Church)

Ernest Hill (c.1944) Edward Forshaw (c.1948)

- Gerry Thacker
- Roy Seville ?? - 2003
- Christopher Strickland 2004 - 2016
- Ian Thompson 2016 - present

== Clock ==
In 1856 St Mary’s Church was installing a new clock and gave the old one built by Henry Knight of Birmingham and dating from 1828 to St John’s. It was installed in St John’s in October 1856 with new dials by voluntary subscription and was a great benefit to the residents of the area.
