= Kidderminster =

Civil parish and human settlement in England

Coordinates: 52.3885°N 2.2490°W

- Town and Civil Parish
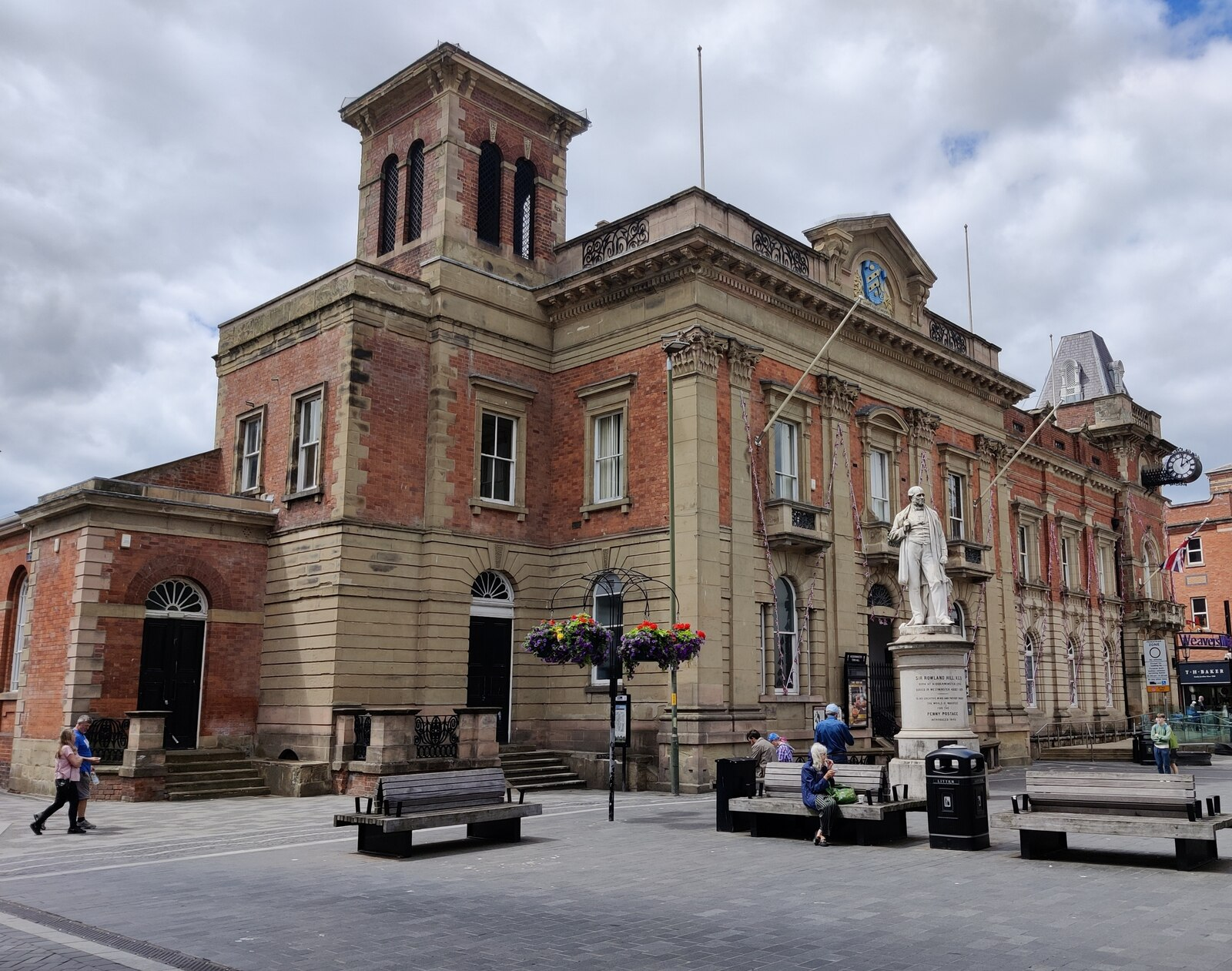
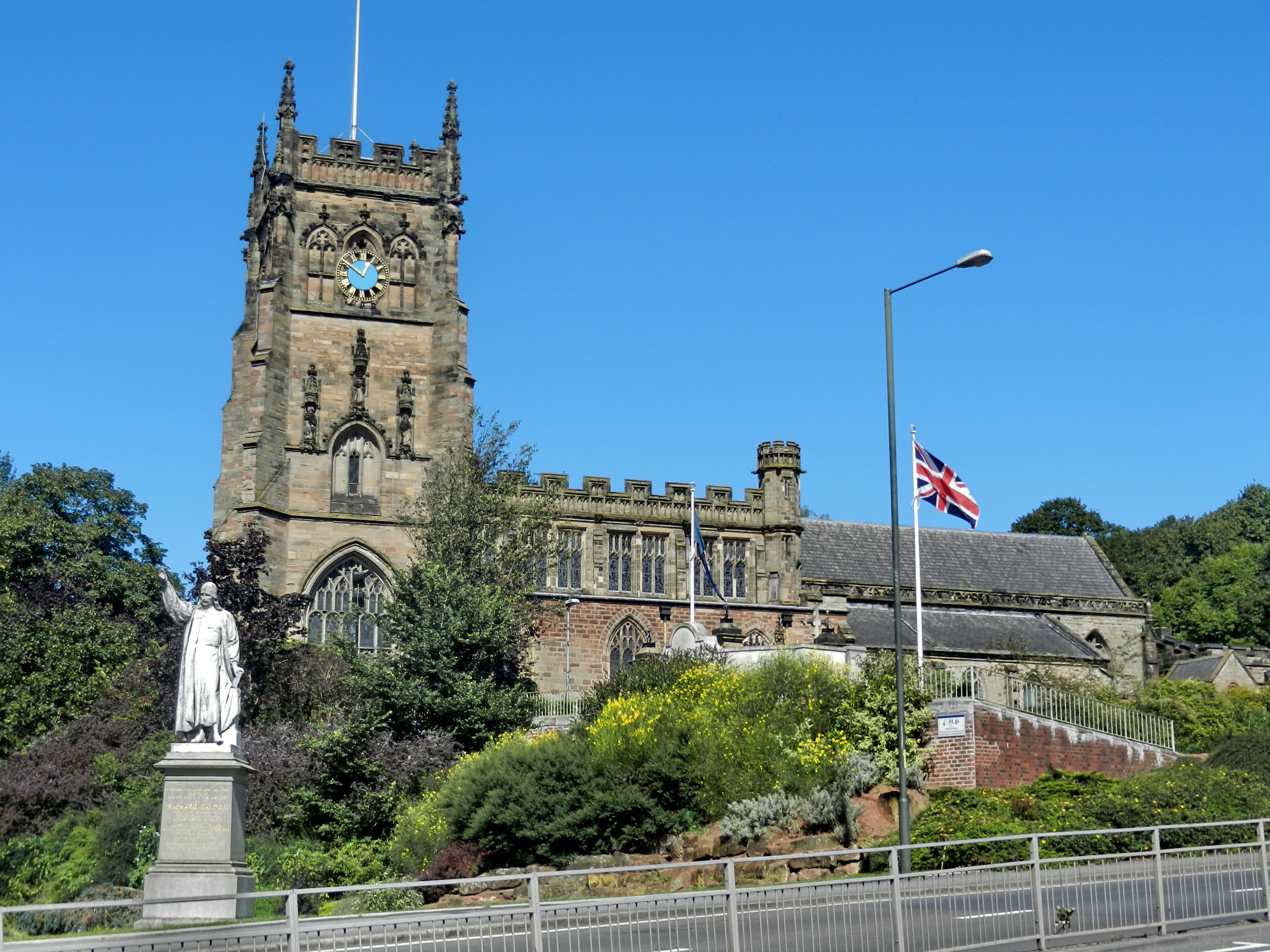
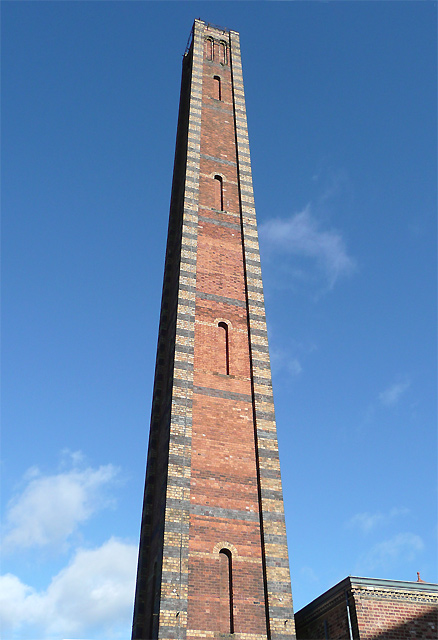
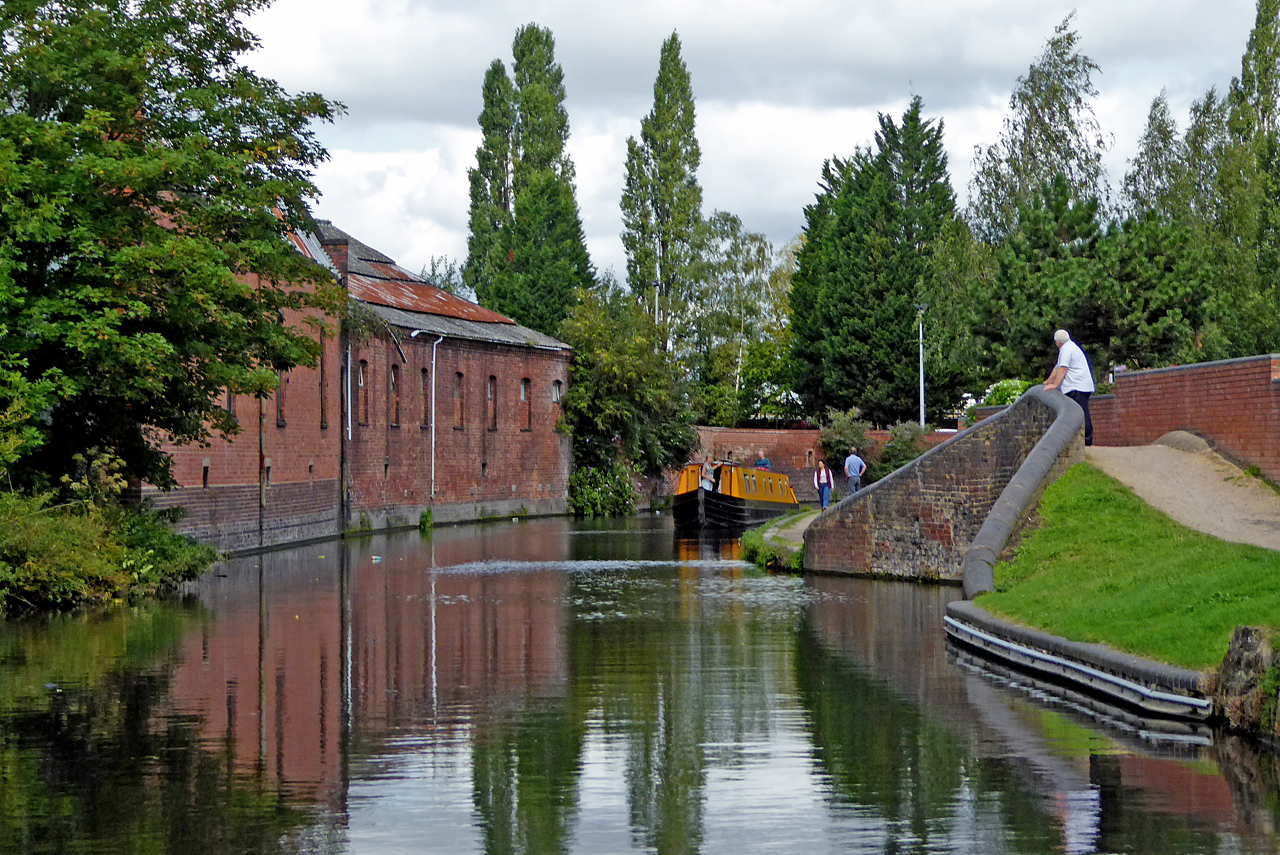
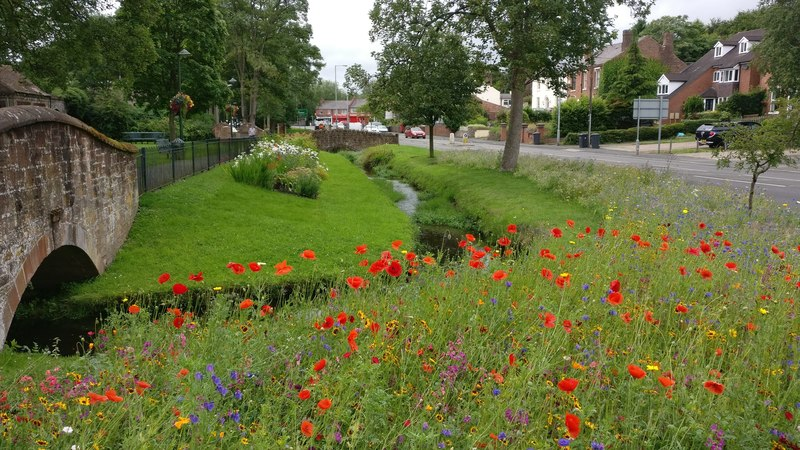
- Town Hall, and statue of Sir Rowland Hill St Mary's Church Slingfield Chimney Staffs and Worcs canal Broadwaters Park

- Location within Worcestershire
- Area: 16.25 km^{2} (6.27 sq mi)
- Population: 57,400 (2021)
  - Density: 3,532/km^{2} (9,150/sq mi)
- OS grid reference: SO831767
  - London: 131 miles (211 km) SE
- Civil parish: Kidderminster
- District: Wyre Forest
- Shire county: Worcestershire
- Region: West Midlands
- Country: England
- Sovereign state: United Kingdom
- Post town: KIDDERMINSTER
- Postcode district: DY10, DY11
- Dialling code: 01562
- Police: West Mercia
- Fire: Hereford and Worcester
- Ambulance: West Midlands
- UK Parliament: Wyre Forest
- Website: Kidderminster Town Council

Kidderminster is a market town and civil parish in Worcestershire, England, 18 miles (29 km) south-west of Birmingham and 15 miles (24 km) north of Worcester. Located north of the River Stour and east of the River Severn, in the 2021 census, it had a population of 57,400. The town is twinned with Husum, Germany.

Situated in the far north of Worcestershire (and with its northern suburbs only 3 and 4 miles from the Staffordshire and Shropshire borders respectively), the town is the main administration centre for the wider Wyre Forest District, which includes the towns of Stourport-on-Severn and Bewdley, along with other outlying settlements.

== History ==
The land around Kidderminster may have been first populated by the Husmerae, an Anglo-Saxon tribe first mentioned in the Ismere Diploma, a document in which Ethelbald of Mercia granted a "parcel of land of ten hides" to Cyneberht. This developed as the settlement of Stour-in-Usmere, which was later the subject of a territorial dispute settled by Offa of Mercia in 781, when he restored certain rights to Bishop Heathored. This allowed for the founding of a monastery or minstre in the area.

The earliest written form of the name Kidderminster was first documented in the Domesday Book of 1086, where it appears as Chideminstre, meaning 'Cydda or Cydela's minster or monastery'. It was a large manor held by William the Conqueror, with 16 outlying settlements (Bristitune, Fastochesfeld, Franche, Habberley, Hurcott, Mitton, Oldington, Ribbesford, Sudwale, Sutton, Teulesberge, Trimpley, Wannerton and Wribbenhall). Various spellings were in use – Kedeleministre or Kideministre (in the 12th and 13th centuries), Kyderemunstre (13th–15th centuries) – until the name of the town was settled as Kidderminster by the 16th century. Between 1156 and 1162 Henry II granted the manor to his steward, Manasser Biset. By six decades later, the settlement grew and a fair (1228) and later a market (1240) were established there.

To the south by the River Stour, dating from the 15th century, is a single surviving tower of Caldwall (or Caldwell) Castle, a fortified manor house.

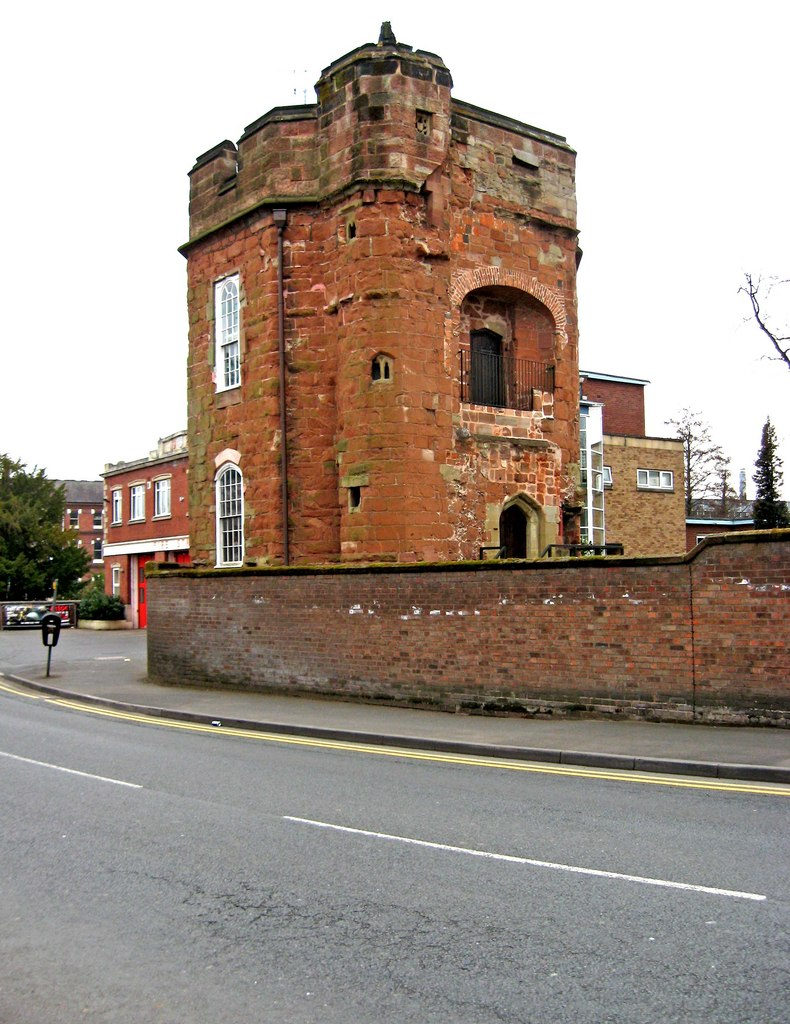
Caldwall Castle

Kidderminster owes its growth to the early development of the cloth industry, which was aided by its position upon the River Stour, and its location at the confluence of four main roads to Birmingham, Dudley, Worcester, Bewdley and Bridgnorth. In a visit to the town sometime around 1540, King's Antiquary John Leland noted that Kidderminster "standeth most by clothing". Over the following centuries the town specialised in textile trades such as weaving, fulling, cloth working and milling, and was also home to numerous other trades including shoemaking, haberdashery, saddle making, dyers, tailors, tanners and glovers.

King Charles I granted the Borough of Kidderminster a Charter in 1636. The original charter can be viewed at Kidderminster Town Hall.

Kidderminster's location at the junction of several major roads made it strategically important during the English Civil War, with several skirmishes occurring in and around the town.

In 1670–1671, Kidderminster's cloth industry obtained a guild by act of parliament and, by 1677, the town had as many as 459 weavers and perhaps 3,000 spinners. Following King Louis XIV's revocation of the Edict of Nantes in October 1685 and the subsequent renewed persecution of French Protestants in France, many Huguenots emigrated to Britain. The immigration and settlement of waves of industrious Huguenots brought the benefits of skilled artisans, merchants and manufacturers to Britain. They contributed to a preexisting but basic cloth weaving industry in towns and cities throughout England, in some cases establishing new businesses. In Worcestershire, the Huguenots established themselves at Worcester, Evesham, Droitwich and Kidderminster.

In the early 18th century, carpet weaving was introduced to Kidderminster, and this rapidly became the staple trade of the town. Its growth was aided by the opening of the Staffordshire and Worcestershire Canal in 1771, and later the arrival of the railway to the town in 1852. The carpet industry went into decline in the 1970s, but still continues on a reduced scale.

Poor trade conditions in 1828, when 2,000 looms were not working for an 18-week period, led to riots, in which £3,000 of damage was done during one night.

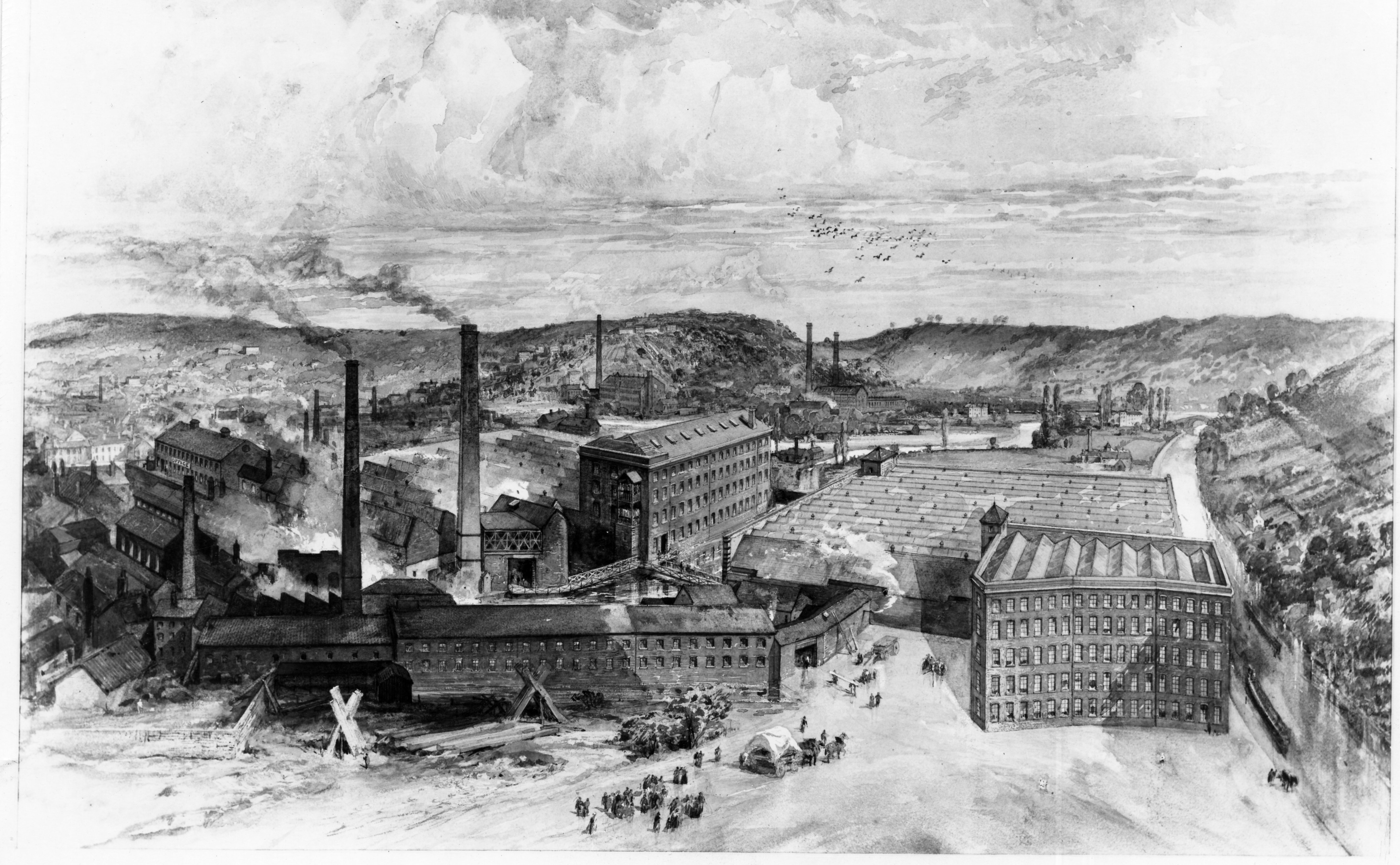
Brintons carpet factory in Kidderminster, c. 1870

The town's local government was reformed by the Municipal Reform Act 1835, which incorporated Kidderminster as a municipal borough. This superseded the charter of 1636, and divided the borough into three wards represented by six aldermen and eighteen councillors; the number of wards was doubled in the 1880s. The current Town Hall on Vicar Street was built in 1877.

Kidderminster has two Commissioners' churches. The first is St George's, on Radford Avenue; this was designed by Francis Goodwin and built in 1821–1824, finally being consecrated in April 1824. Its grant of just over £17,000.00, was the third-largest given by the commission to any church outside London. The second church is St John's, on the Bewdley Road. This was built in 1843 and the architect was Matthew Steele; its grant was just over £4,000.

The Shrubbery was converted into a military headquarters towards the end of the 19th century.

In 1974, the old borough of Kidderminster was abolished and merged into the new Wyre Forest District. In December 2015, Kidderminster was established as a civil parish with a new town council, following a public referendum.

== Geography ==
The River Stour and the Staffordshire and Worcestershire Canal both flow through Kidderminster town centre.

== Economy ==
The modern carpet industry was founded in the area in 1785 by Brintons. The carpet industry became extremely important to the local economy, so much so that the local newspaper is still named The Shuttle after the shuttles used on the carpet looms. A type of carpet was known as Kidderminster carpet or, in the United States, Ingrain carpet: this was a reversible carpet with no pile, with the pattern showing in opposite colours on the two faces, and was popular from the 18th to early 20th centuries. By 1951, there were more than thirty carpet manufacturers in the town, including, for example, Quayle & Tranter (now defunct). They commissioned such notable artists as George Bain to create their traditional Celtic designs. Aided by a 2004 grant from the Heritage Lottery Fund, a museum dedicated to the Kidderminster carpet industry was officially opened by Lord Cobham in 2012.

== Politics ==
Kidderminster Town is a civil parish within Wyre Forest District, with Kidderminster Town Council created in the early 21st century to take on the duties of a parish council, following a referendum in May 2015. Prior to this, charter trustees maintained the traditions of the town and elected a mayor. At the 2019 local elections to Wyre Forest District Council, the Conservatives lost their majority and the council was taken over by a "Progressive Alliance" formed of independents and councillors from other parties. However, in May 2022, Health Concern announced they would not be standing at the next election, instead favouring a unified independent offering. At the following election in 2023, the Conservatives regained majority control after a collapse in the independent and former Health Concern vote, one of only two council gains nationally.

The area (initially as Kidderminster, then after 1983 as the Wyre Forest constituency) has been represented by Conservative members of parliament (MPs) Gerald Nabarro 1950–1964, Tatton Brinton 1964–1974, Esmond Bulmer 1974–1987, Anthony Coombs 1987–1997, and Labour MP David Lock 1997–2001. In the 2001 United Kingdom general election, the town returned Dr Richard Taylor as an independent MP for the Wyre Forest parliamentary constituency. Taylor had fought the election to protest against the proposed reduction in services at Kidderminster Hospital. He held his seat at the 2005 election, the first independent MP to do so since 1949. Mark Garnier has held the seat of Wyre Forest since the 2010 election increasing his majority each time until the 2024 general election, which saw a Conservative majority of just 812 votes.

== Demographics ==
At the 2011 census, there were 55,530 residents in Kidderminster in 24,869 households. The median age of Kidderminster residents was 41.

Kidderminster's population at the 2011 census was predominantly White (96.8%). The largest non-white groups were Asian at 1.7%, and mixed race at 1.2%.

67% of Kidderminster residents identified as Christian, with 24.7% stating they had no religion, and 6.6% not stating any religion. The largest non-Christian group were Muslims at 0.8%, followed by Buddhists at 0.2% and Hindus and Sikhs at 0.1% each, with others at 0.4%.

== Architecture and landmarks ==
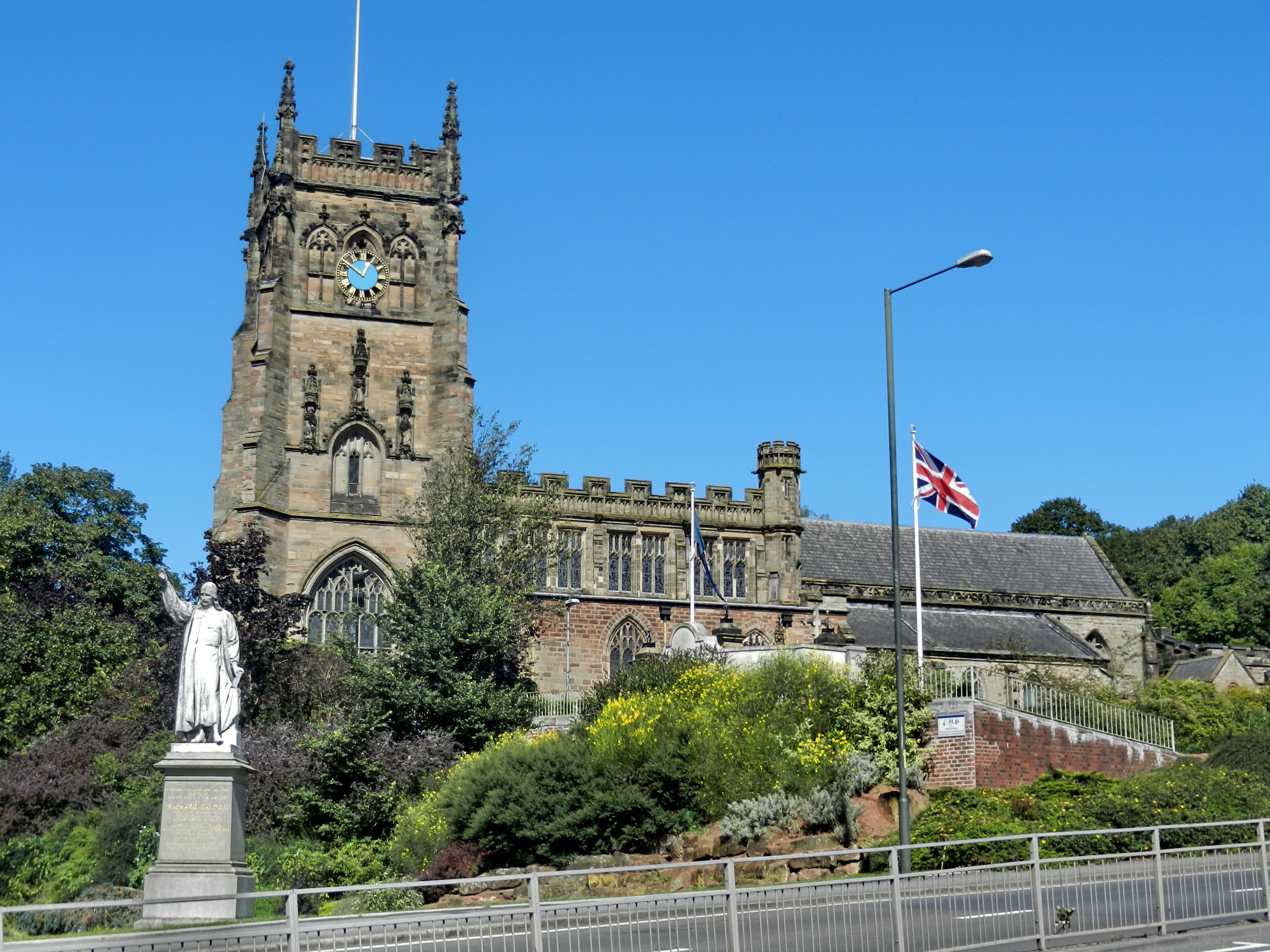
St Mary and All Saints' Church

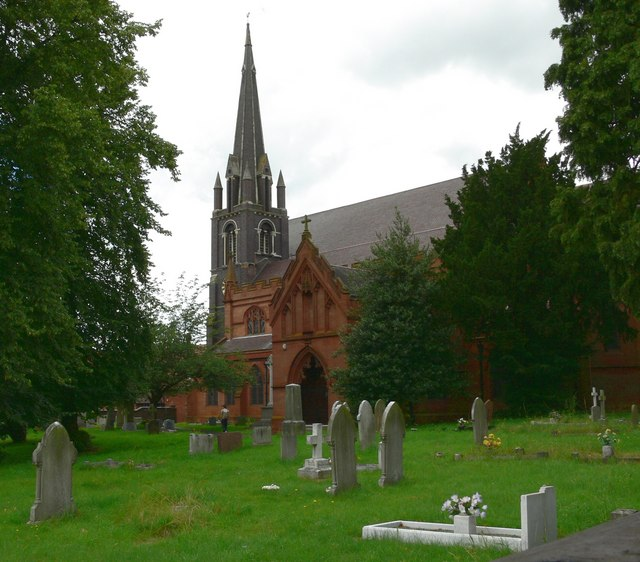
St John the Baptist's Church (Church of England), built in 1843

Kidderminster's parish church of St Mary and All Saints' is a grade I listed building dating mostly from the 15th and 16th centuries. Another notable church is St John's, which is grade II listed, and dates from 1843. Other listed buildings of note in the town include the Town Hall of 1877; The Shrubbery, a 19th-century mansion; and the Kidderminster Register Office. Many of Kidderminster's historic buildings were lost from the 1960s; this led to the creation of the Kidderminster Civic Society in 1993 to promote preservation of the town's heritage.

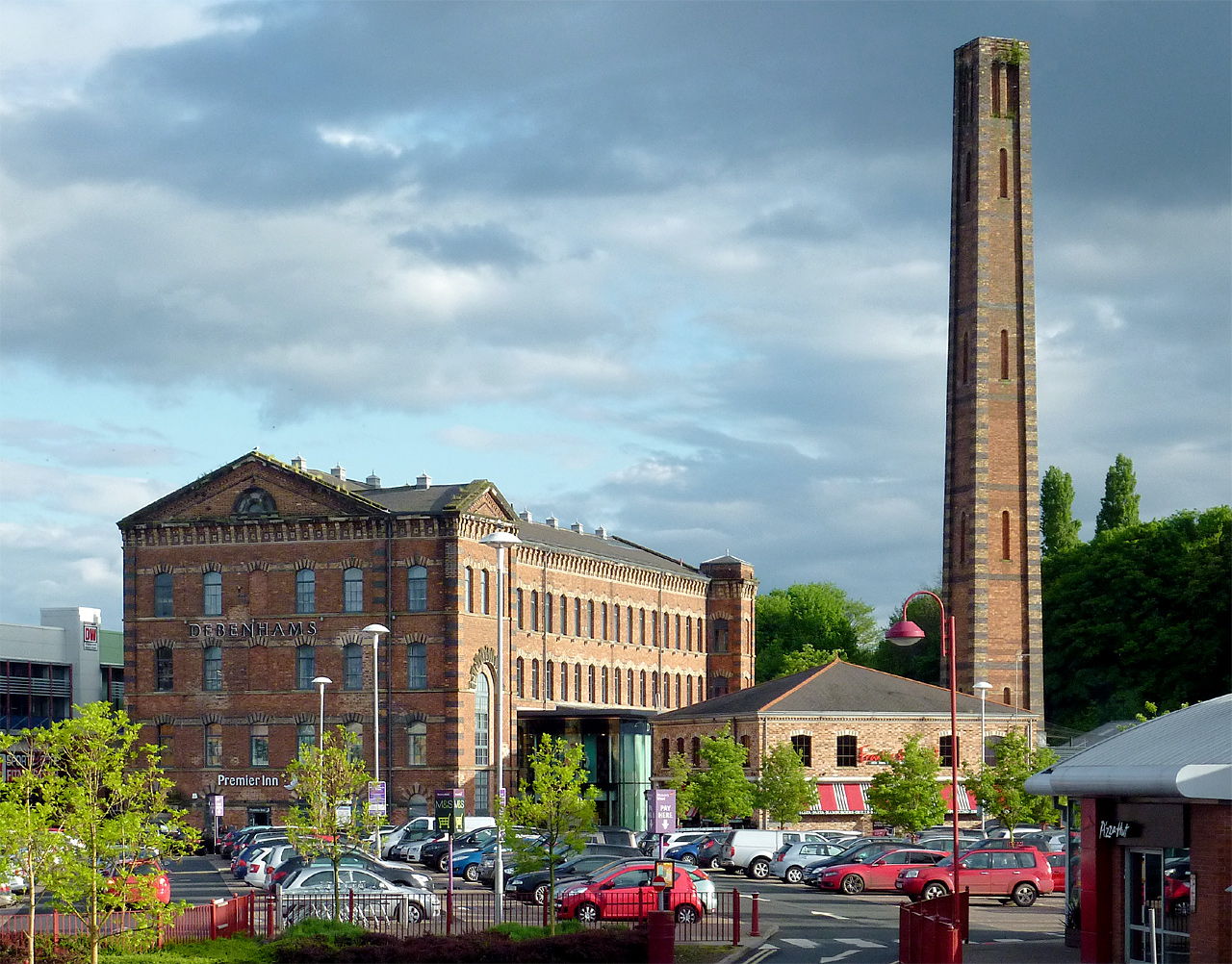
The former Slingfield Mill

There are some former factory buildings of note in Kidderminster, which have mostly been converted to other uses. A notable one is the former Slingfield Mill, dating from 1864 to 1870, which is grade II listed, and has been converted for retail use.

In the 1968 Buildings of England volume on Worcestershire, Pevsner described the town as: "uncommonly devoid of visual pleasure and architectural interest." Crown House, an early 1970s office block, was particularly criticised, and was once rated among the top 10 ugliest buildings in Britain. Demolition was completed in April 2020, improving the Kidderminster skyline. In the 2007 revision of this volume, Alan Brooks wrote: "the 19th century mill buildings, together with the churches, provide most of the architectural interest in a town otherwise uncommonly lacking in visual pleasures."

== Transport ==
Rail

Two railway stations in the town share the same approach road and are located fewer than fifty metres apart. The main National Rail station, operated by West Midlands Trains, is Kidderminster, from where trains run to Birmingham and Worcester. The other station, Kidderminster Town, is the terminus of the preserved Heritage Railway line, Severn Valley Railway, from where trains run to Bridgnorth.

Road

Several major routes run through the town, including the A456, which runs from Birmingham to just south of Woofferton, Shropshire; the A451, which runs from Stourbridge to Abberley; the A442, which runs from Droitwich to Hodnet, Shropshire (a few miles north of Telford); the A449, which runs from Newport in south Wales to Stafford and crosses the A456 at the Land Oak; and the A448 road, which starts in the town and goes to Studley in Warwickshire, via Bromsgrove and Redditch. A major change in the town centre road infrastructure was the construction of the ring road in the 1970s and 1980s. This relieved the town's growing congestion but diverted traffic outside the centre, drawing off customers for businesses. The final phase of the ring road was never completed, which results in the town having a ring road that does not form a complete ring.

The nearest motorway is the M5, which signs Kidderminster from junction 3 (Halesowen) with the A456, and junction 6 (Worcester North) with the A449.

Waterways

The Staffordshire and Worcestershire Canal passes through the town.

Bus

There are direct bus links with towns including Worcester, Halesowen, Bewdley, Stourport, Bridgnorth, Bromsgrove and Redditch. The majority of the services in Kidderminster are operated by Diamond West Midlands (previously First Midland Red) while the rest is operated by Select Bus Services (297), Finesse and Yarranton Brothers. Services 291 and 292 were operated by R & B Travel prior to the company surrendering its licence in January 2020. Services 15A/C, S15, 294, 580 and 133were operated by Coniston Coaches prior to surrendering its licence in October 2020. 15A/C, S15 & 294 were passed onto Astons until 2021 and 2022. Service 297 was operated by Arriva Midlands until 4 September 2023 when Select won the contract for the service.

Diamond Bus service 125 connects Kidderminster to Bridgnorth while service 25A connects Kidderminster with Dudley via Stourbridge and the Merry Hill Centre. The 25A service has since been awarded to National Express West Midlands as 25 but still running Kidderminster to Dudley via Stourbridge and the Merry Hill Centre

== Education ==
As part of educational restructuring in the Wyre Forest District, Kidderminster's schools were reorganised from a three-tier system of first, middle and high schools to the two-tier system more common in the UK as a whole, featuring primary schools and secondary schools. In this process, several first and middle schools were closed or merged into new primaries. The three high schools of King Charles I School, Wolverley C E Secondary School, and Baxter College (formerly Harry Cheshire High School) became secondary schools that included sixth forms.

Independent schools include Heathfield Knoll School in Wolverley. Formerly independent, Holy Trinity School became a state-funded free school in 2014. Kidderminster College is located in Market Street in the town centre, having moved from older premises on Hoo Road in 2003. Other local secondary schools include The Stourport High School and Sixth Form Centre and The Bewdley School.

== Sport ==
=== Cricket ===
Kidderminster CC is a local cricket club at the home ground of which, Chester Road North Ground, Worcestershire County Cricket Club play occasional County Championship and county 2nd XI games.

=== Football ===
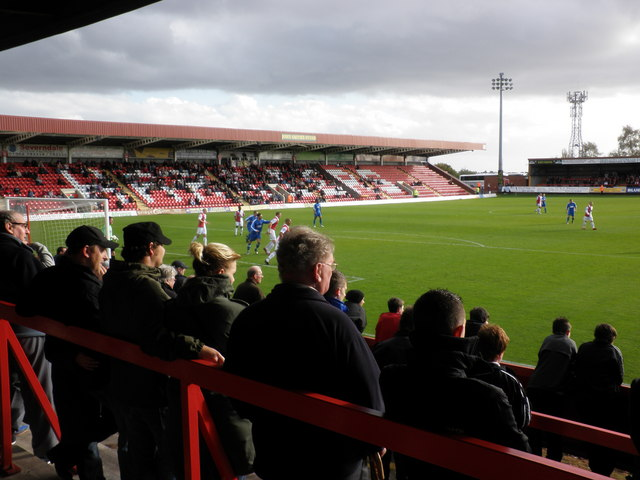
Aggborough is the home ground of the professional club Kidderminster Harriers, formerly of the Football League.

Formed in 1886, Kidderminster Harriers F.C. is the town's professional football club. Local rivals of the Harriers were traditionally Worcester City and Bromsgrove Rovers, and in recent years also Cheltenham Town and Hereford United. As of 2023, Cheltenham are in League One, two divisions above Kidderminster, with Hereford being the division below Kidderminster.

In 2005, the Harriers were relegated to the Conference Premier after five years in the Football League Two division. They had reached the Football League as Conference champions in 2000, and are Worcestershire's only representative in the league. They had won the title in 1994 but were denied promotion then, as their stadium did not meet Football League capacity requirements. That same year, they eliminated Birmingham City from the FA Cup; they eventually reached the fifth round of the competition (just missing the quarter-finals), where they hosted Premier League side West Ham United, narrowly losing 0–1. Prior to Lincoln City's run in the competition in 2017, Harriers were the last non-league side to reach round five of the FA Cup. Harriers were relegated to the National League North in 2016.

In recent years, Kidderminster have seen some success under manager and former Harriers player Russell Penn. A strong FA Cup run in the 2021–2022 season led to the Harriers facing Premier League side West Ham in, as they had done in 1994. The affair ended in a 1–2 defeat, yet the game led to major economic benefit for the club, with TV money and ticket sales generating large amounts of income. Harriers further went into the Play-Offs that same season, but were eliminated in their first game to Boston United. In the 2022–2023 season, Kidderminster again reached the Play-Offs, achieving the feat on the last game of the season after an excellent late run of league form. Harriers beat Alfreton, King's Lynn and finally Brackley in the Play-Offs and regained promotion to the National League.

The Kidderminster & District League has operated since 1984 and draws teams from Worcestershire and South Staffordshire.

=== Rugby ===
Kidderminster Carolians RFC is a local rugby union club, currently playing at level 7 in Counties 1 Midlands West (North) at First XV Level and Counties 4 Midlands West (South) at 2nd XV level.

Regularly putting out three senior teams including veterans, the club also has a Colts (U18s) age group, a developing women's team since 2021, and a large minis and juniors section.

=== Hockey ===
Kidderminster Hockey Club was founded in 1892. By 2010, there were five men's hockey teams, a women's team and a junior team. The club was dissolved in 2022.

== Local attractions ==
Located in Kidderminster is the Severn Valley Railway a heritage railway. The Museum of Carpet, opened in 2012, showcases the town's contribution to the carpet industry. Brinton Park is an urban park to the south of the town centre, comprising 30 acres (12 ha) of land donated by John Brinton in the 1880s. Another green space is Wilden Marsh, a nature reserve covering 94 acres (38 ha) to the south of Kidderminster.

Places of interest near Kidderminster include the West Midlands Safari Park to the west of Kidderminster towards Bewdley. A few miles south of the town is Hartlebury Castle, which houses the Worcestershire County Museum. A few miles north are the Drakelow Tunnels, a former underground military complex, which has an attached museum.

== Local media ==
The local newspapers covering Kidderminster are The Shuttle and the Kidderminster Standard.

Local news and television shows are provided by BBC West Midlands and ITV Central. Television signals are received from the Sutton Coldfield and local relay transmitters.

107.2 The Wyre was the town's first local commercial radio station; it began broadcasting on 12 September 2005 from studios in Kidderminster, and was closed in 2012. Other radio stations providing local coverage are Hits Radio Herefordshire & Worcestershire, Sunshine Radio and BBC Hereford & Worcester. Signal 107 was launched on 26 March 2012; it now broadcasts as Greatest Hits Radio Hereford & Worcester.

== Climate ==
The town is noted for its particularly high record lows. Despite an average July low of 11.7 °C, the temperature has never fallen below 5 °C in that month. The coldest and warmest July nights were both recorded in 2015.

Climate data for Kidderminster
Month	Jan	Feb	Mar	Apr	May	Jun	Jul	Aug	Sep	Oct	Nov	Dec	Year
Record high °C (°F)	18.0 (64.4)	19.6 (67.3)	25.0 (77.0)	26.6 (79.9)	28.2 (82.8)	32.0 (89.6)	34.6 (94.3)	32.0 (89.6)	27.6 (81.7)	27.0 (80.6)	18.0 (64.4)	19.1 (66.4)	34.6 (94.3)
Mean daily maximum °C (°F)	6.8 (44.2)	7.4 (45.3)	10.2 (50.4)	13.3 (55.9)	16.8 (62.2)	19.5 (67.1)	21.8 (71.2)	21.4 (70.5)	18.3 (64.9)	14.0 (57.2)	9.7 (49.5)	7.0 (44.6)	13.9 (56.9)
Mean daily minimum °C (°F)	1.3 (34.3)	0.8 (33.4)	2.7 (36.9)	3.9 (39.0)	6.7 (44.1)	9.7 (49.5)	11.7 (53.1)	11.6 (52.9)	9.5 (49.1)	6.7 (44.1)	3.7 (38.7)	1.5 (34.7)	5.8 (42.5)
Record low °C (°F)	−8.0 (17.6)	−11.9 (10.6)	−7.0 (19.4)	−3.0 (26.6)	0.0 (32.0)	2.0 (35.6)	5.0 (41.0)	6.0 (42.8)	−6.0 (21.2)	−3.0 (26.6)	−7.0 (19.4)	−10.1 (13.8)	−11.9 (10.6)
Average rainfall mm (inches)	65.6 (2.58)	46.1 (1.81)	53.1 (2.09)	62.0 (2.44)	56.7 (2.23)	59.1 (2.33)	54.8 (2.16)	64.4 (2.54)	62.9 (2.48)	80.8 (3.18)	72.4 (2.85)	73.3 (2.89)	751.2 (29.58)
Average rainy days (≥ 1.0 mm)	12.5	9.6	11.0	10.5	10.4	9.7	9.4	9.8	9.6	12.0	12.0	11.8	128.3
Mean monthly sunshine hours	53.4	73.6	109.2	151.6	190.8	191.3	200.7	186.0	140.4	107.1	62.4	46.7	1,513.2
Source 1: Met Office
Source 2: MyWeather2.com

== Notable residents ==
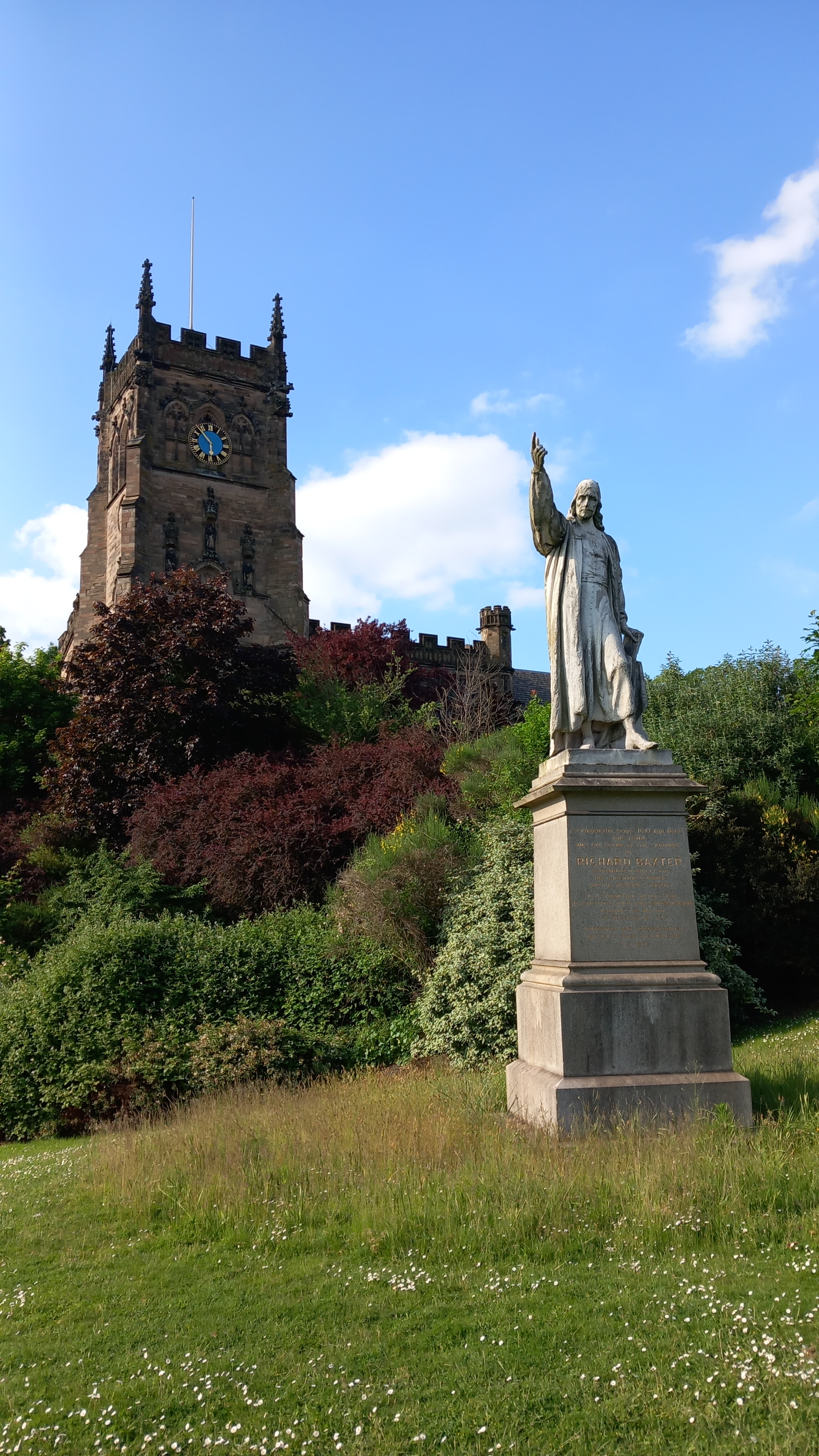
A statue of Richard Baxter in Kidderminster outside St Mary and All Saints' Church.

- Richard Baxter, Puritan minister. He began his ministry in Kidderminster in April 1641 and served there for the next 19 years. A memorial statue of him was erected outside St Mary's parish church, where he was based. The inscription states his wish "for unity and comprehension in religion". Prior to beginning his ministry in Kidderminster, Baxter lived in Bridgnorth from 1640 to 1641.
- Mark Birch, former guitarist with Wishbone Ash, was born and brought up in Kidderminster.
- Edward Bradley, the English humourist of the mid-Victorian era, was born in Kidderminster in 1827.
- Lant Carpenter, English educator and Unitarian minister, was born in Kidderminster.
- Gilbert Claughton, Chairman of the London North Western Railway
- Noah Cooke, poet, was born in the town.
- Sammi Davis, film actress, was born in Kidderminster.
- Tony De Vit, Birmingham-based nightclub DJ and singer, was born in Kidderminster.
- Alun Evans, English football's first £100,000 teenager, was born in Kidderminster.
- Richard Eve, Grand Treasurer of the United Grand Lodge of England in 1889, was born in Kidderminster.
- Thomas Foley, 1st Baron Foley, MP for Droitwich and Herefordshire, created Baron Foley, of Kidderminster in the County of Worcester in 1776.
- Paul Frampton, theoretical physicist, was born in Kidderminster and educated at King Charles I School.
- Ukawsaw Gronniosaw, also known as James Albert, lived with his family in the town in the 1760s and 1770s. An African prince and freed slave, he worked on his autobiography in Kidderminster, with a secretary from Leominster. Published at Bath in about 1772, this was considered the first Black African autobiography published in Britain.
- Robert Hamer, film director and screenwriter, known for his 1949 comedy Kind Hearts and Coronets, starring Dennis Price and Alec Guinness, was born in Kidderminster.
- Jowe Head (born as Joe Hendon in Kidderminster) is a bass guitarist, singer and visual artist, and was a member of Swell Maps before joining the Television Personalities.
- Sir Rowland Hill, the inventor of the Penny Black and the modern postal system, was born in Blackwell Street. There is a statue, sculpted by Sir Thomas Brock, to him in Vicar Street outside the town hall. There was a pub in the Bull Ring called The Penny Black in his honour.
- Henry Eliot Howard, director of a steelwork in Worcester, and amateur ornithologist, was born at Stone House near Kidderminster.
- Eustace Jotham served as a British Army captain in the Great War, winning the Victoria Cross in 1915; he was born in Kidderminster.
- Walter W. Law was born in Kidderminster to a carpet dealer, and worked as a carpet manufacturer. He later emigrated to the United States, where he founded Briarcliff Manor, New York.
- Iskra Lawrence, model, grew up in Kidderminster.
- Rustie Lee, TV personality and celebrity chef, used to live on the outskirts of the town.
- Sir Josiah Mason, an English pen-manufacturer, was born in the town's Mill Street.
- Walter Nash, former Labour Prime Minister of New Zealand, was born in the town.
- James O'Brien, radio talk show host of LBC and journalist, was brought up in Kidderminster.
- Job Orton, English dissenting minister, lived in Kidderminster in retirement from 1766 until his death.
- Taylor Parkes, journalist and broadcaster, was born in West Bromwich but grew up in Kidderminster.
- Ewan Pearson, DJ and record producer, grew up in Kidderminster.
- Robert Plant, English musician who was the front man of the 1970s English rock band Led Zeppelin, grew up in Kidderminster and has had associations with Kidderminster College.
- Stuart Matthew Price, singer and composer, was born in the town.
- Jess Roden, singer, was born in Kidderminster.
- Mike Sanchez, rhythm and blues pianist and vocalist, is a long-time resident of Kidderminster.
- Sir Herbert Smith, 1st Baronet, Kidderminster carpet manufacturer and owner of Witley Court (see Smith of Kidderminster baronets).
- Alf Tabb, Kidderminster cycle maker and rider of miniature cycles.
- Dr Richard Taylor was an independent member of parliament for Wyre Forest, serving from 2001 to 2010. He originally trained as a medical doctor, working as a consultant at Kidderminster General Hospital from 1972 to 1995. He was also co-leader of the National Health Action Party.
- Liz Truss is a former Conservative member of parliament (MP) for South West Norfolk and was Prime Minister for 49 days in 2022. She lived in Kidderminster as a child before her family moved to Scotland when she was four.
- Tom Watson is a former Labour Party Member of Parliament (MP) for West Bromwich East and Deputy Leader of the Labour Party. He was educated at King Charles I High School in Kidderminster.
- Stan Webb, blues guitarist and founder of Chicken Shack, resides in the town.
- John Francis Young served as a soldier in the First World War and won the Victoria Cross as a private in 1918; he was born in Kidderminster.
- Henry Youngman, Methodist minister who was President-General of the Methodist Church of Australasia from 1910 to 1913, considered "the Father of Methodism in Queensland", was born in Kidderminster.

=== Sport ===
- Ollie Allsopp was born in Kidderminster. He is a professional rugby player, formerly of Harlequin F.C.
- Mo Anthoine was born and brought up on Marlpool Lane in Kidderminster. He was a mountain climber famed for his technical skill.
- Peter Collins, former Formula One driver, was born in Kidderminster. During his career, Collins drove for the HWM, Vanwall, Maserati and Ferrari teams and won 3 of his 33 Grands Prix. His promising career was cut short during the 1958 German Grand Prix, when Collins spun off the track and sustained a fatal head injury in the accident that followed.
- Kevin Keelan, footballer, played for Norwich City.
- Melissa Lawley, Liverpool F.C. Women Forward, who signed for the club in 2019.
- Ernest Perry, first-class cricketer, died in Kidderminster.
- John Wyer was born in Kidderminster; he went on to manage repeat victories at Le Mans 24 hours.
