= Alf Tabb =

British bicycle shop owner and trick cyclist

- Tabb riding a miniature bicycle
- Born: March 1883; London, England
- Died: 1976 (aged 93); Kidderminster, Worcestershire, England
- Occupation: Bicycle shop owner
- Known for: Riding miniature bicycles

Alf Tabb (March 1883 − 1976) was a bicycle shop owner and trick cyclist from Kidderminster, Worcestershire. He is most known for building and riding miniature bicycles.

== Biography ==
Tabb was born in London in March 1883, where his father owned a cycle manufacturing company. His first job was as newspaper cyclist in London at the age of 13. In 1921, he married and moved to Kidderminster, where he set up a cycle workshop business in the Stourbridge Road area of town. He ran the shop for 17 years. He retired when he was 75 years old.

=== Trick cyclist ===
In 1938, Tabb built a 15-inch (38 cm) bicycle as his father used to do, to hang outside his shop as an advertising gimmick. Curious as to whether he could ride the bicycle, he tried and found that he could, with a little practice. He was then encouraged to perform his act at the local gliderdrome. This spurred Tabb to make further miniature cycles including an 18-inch (46 cm) tandem and a miniature penny-farthing which had a 12-inch (30 cm) front wheel.

Tabb, his daughter Peggy and granddaughter Pauline, then performed acts of trick cycling to audiences in the UK and America on television. He also set a world record for an unchallenged riding a 12-inch miniature cycle. For over 40 years, nobody could beat Tabb by riding the 12-inch cycle more than 5 yards (4.6 m). He was interviewed by a young Chris Tarrant on ATV in 1972 aged 89.

Tabb's last official performance was at a mayor's ball in 1974, where at the age of 91 he was still able to ride his 12-inch miniature bicycle. Tabb died in 1976, aged 93. Since his death, a road in Kidderminster has been named in his honour, Tabb's Gardens.

=== In popular culture ===
One of Tabb's miniature cycles was featured in a 2020 episode of The Repair Shop television series, having been brought in for restoration by two of Tabb's granddaughters.
