= Kidderminster College =

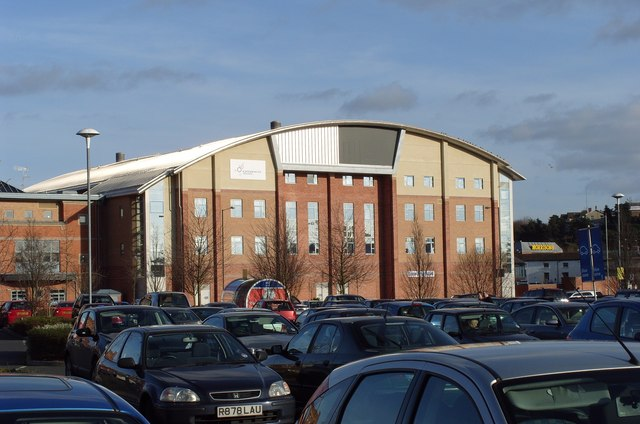

Location
- Market Street; Kidderminster, Worcestershire, DY10 1LX; United Kingdom
- Coordinates: 52.385716°N 2.248807°W

Information
- Type: Further education college
- Department for Education URN: 130711 Tables
- Ofsted: Reports
- Principal: Cat Lewis
- Gender: Mixed
- Age: 16+
- Enrolment: 2,860 (full- and part-time)
- Website: www.kidderminster.ac.uk

Kidderminster College is a post-16 comprehensive college in Kidderminster, England, providing full and part-time adult education. It offers courses that specialise in hairdressing, engineering, creative industries, business administration and construction, and it collaborates closely with local employers on Skillfast, Train to Gain, and Goskills programmes.

== History ==
In 2003, the college moved Hoo Road in the town to its new town centre campus. It also operates outreach centres in Kidderminster and the surrounding Wyre Forest area.

In 2009, around 140 pupils aged 14 to 18 from other local schools were following vocational courses at the college.

In August 2014, Kidderminster College merged with NCG. It is now one of seven colleges within NCG.

In 2018, Ofsted rated the college grade 3 ("requires improvement") for its overall performance. In June of the same year, Ofsted rated NCG "requires improvement".

In January 2022, Ofsted rated NCG "good".
