= Hippodrome Cinema, Bo'ness =

Hippodrome Cinema
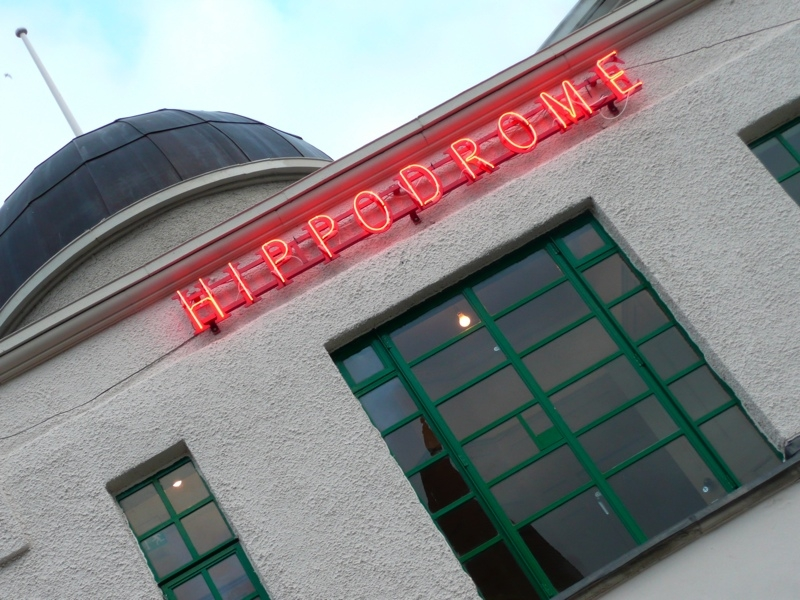
- The Hippodrome Cinema signage

- Hippodrome Cinema's location within Falkirk
- 56.017°N 3.608°W
- Location: Bo'ness, Falkirk, Scotland

History
- Founded: 20th century
- Built: 1911

Site notes
- Architect: Matthew Steele
- Architectural style: Early Modern
- Restored: 2008

Listed Building – Category A
- Official name: The Hippodrome
- Designated: 1 June 1979
- Reference no.: LB22380

The Hippodrome Cinema in Bo'ness is an early example of a purpose-built cinema and thought to be the oldest such building surviving in Scotland. The cinema, which opened in 1912, was built for the Bo'ness cinematography pioneer Louis Dickson and designed by renowned local architect Matthew Steele. It is designated as a Category A listed building.

== History ==
The name and the circular form of the building that Steele produced for Dickson might suggest that it was originally designed as a circus or theatre venue for travelling shows, but the earliest known plans, dated October 1911, show no evidence of this. They do, however, show a dedicated Operators box for a projector and are labelled 'Proposed Picture Palace, Hope Street'.

Constructed on a corner site, the Hippodrome consists of a circular auditorium with wrap-around gallery facing a proscenium and small stage. What little ancillary space was wrapped around this filled in the corners of the site. The October 1911 plans show that at this stage the lavatories were 'to be built later'. The flat roof was supported on three girders, running parallel to the screen.

In 1926, the cinema underwent various transformations by the original architect, including adding a domed roof and ticket office. The last film shown was in August 1975, after which it was turned into a bingo hall until its closure in 1980. Thereafter, it was left abandoned and at the mercy of vandals.

The building was listed Category B by Historic Scotland in 1979, and upgraded to Category A in 2004.

== Present ==
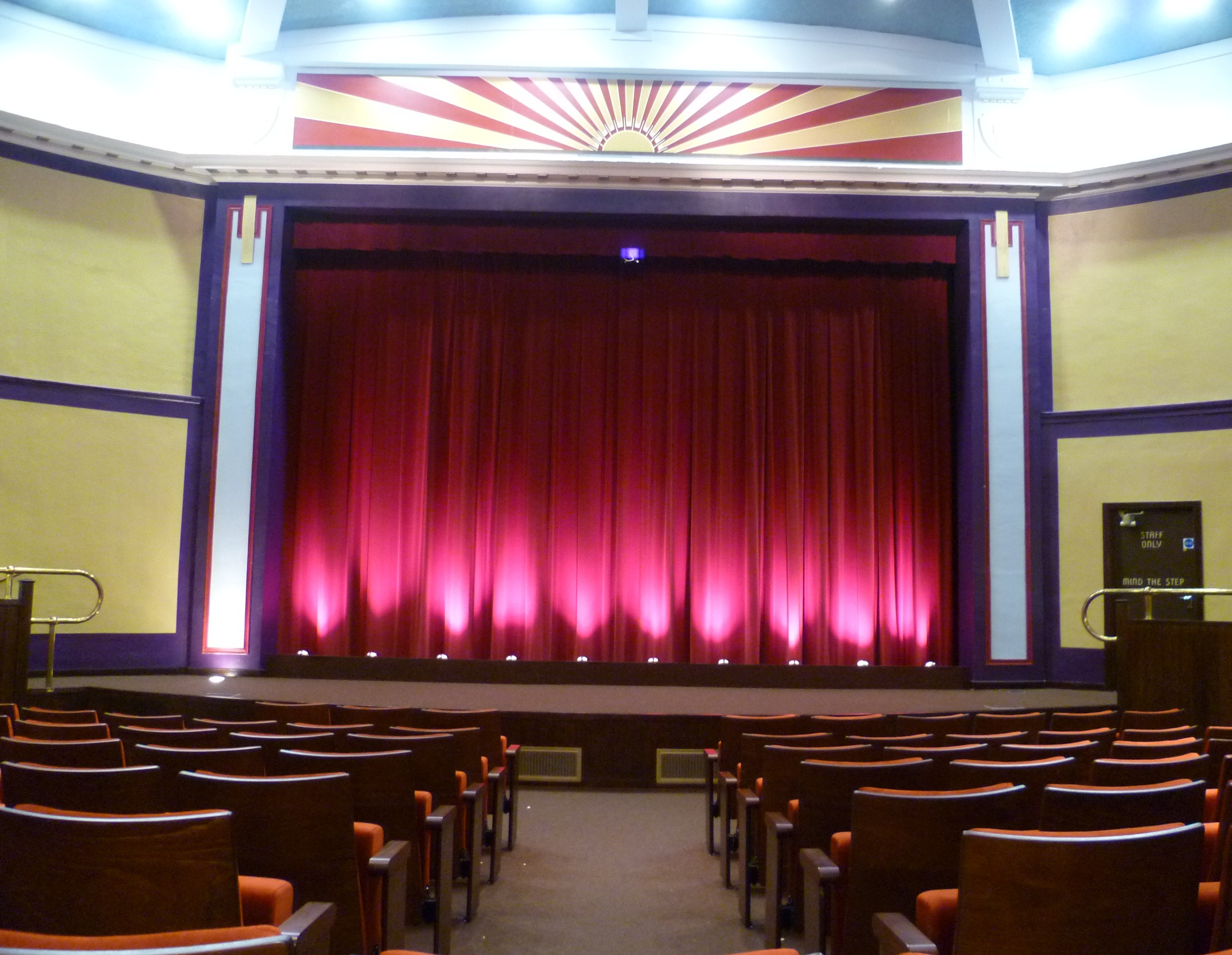
The cinema's interior

In 2002, Scottish Historic Buildings Trust (SHBT) invited three companies to respond to their brief to find a use for the former Hippodrome Cinema. The agreement made provision for the refurbished building to be transferred or leased to the creators of the preferred scheme on favourable terms, in return for their speculative consultancy work.

Restoring the cinema to its former use and the creation of a community space was proposed by IDEAS, a Falkirk-based design firm. At the time, the preferred option was for the building to be used as a gym; SHBT requested that they retain an option on the IDEAS proposals.

Later, Falkirk Council initiated an HLF Townscape Heritage Initiative for Bo'ness. A sustainable use for the Hippodrome was considered critical, indeed pivotal to the release of grant funding, the IDEAS proposal was revived and considered worthy.

Following grants from various organisations amounting to £1.8 million, the cinema underwent renovation from the middle of 2006. The restoration work saved original features, including: cast iron radiators, oak panelling in the foyer area and art deco signs for toilets. The work was largely completed on 14 February 2008 when the keys were handed over to its new owner, Falkirk Council. The renovation then went through a final phase when modern cinema projection and sound equipment were added. On 9 April 2009, the cinema finally opened its doors again to the public, a reminder of the golden age of cinema.

On 1 July 2011, Falkirk Community Trust assumed responsibility for the management and operation of the Bo'ness Hippodrome.

In 2014, VisitScotland awarded the venue a four star rating, indicating "an excellent standard".
