= Frederick William Wadely =

English organist and composer

Frederick William Wadely OBE FRCO (30 July 1882 - 28 May 1970) was an English organist and composer.

== Background ==
He was born in Kidderminster in 1882, the son of organist William Edward Wadely and Zoe (née Gilbert).

He was trained at the Royal College of Music and was then organ scholar at Selwyn College, Cambridge.

He married Ethel Muriel Stokes in 1910. They had three children:

- Zoe Beatrice Wadely (1912 – 1990)
- Michael Wadely (1916 – 1999)
- Beryl Wadely

He was awarded Honorary Fellowship of the Royal School of Church Music in 1947.

== Appointments ==
- Organ scholar at Selwyn College, Cambridge 1900 – 1903
- Organist of St. Andrew’s Church, Uxbridge 1903 – 1904
- Organist of Malvern Priory 1904 - 1910
- Organist of Carlisle Cathedral 1910 - 1960

== List of compositions ==
=== Church music ===
- Magnificat and Nunc Dimittis in B flat - 1904 (unpublished)
- O whither would ye go? (carol - words by Canon Anthony Deane of Malvern) - Stainer & Bell 1911
- Give peace in our time - Novello 1914
- Peace I leave with you - Stainer & Bell 1914
- The strife is o’er - Stainer & Bell 1916
- There shall come forth a rod - Novello 1917
- If ye then be risen with Christ - Novello 1918
- Three in One and One in Three - Novello 1918
- Lead us, Heavenly Father - Novello 1919
- The night was dark (carol - words by H. D. Rawnsley) - Stainer & Bell 1919
- O Loving Saviour (words by James Walter Brown) - Novello 1920
- And thou Bethlehem - Novello 1920
- Praise O praise our God and King - Novello 1925
- Turn thou us - Novello 1927
- O God of Wisdom (words by James Walter Brown) - Novello 1928
- Hail the Babe (carol - words by James Walter Brown) - Stainer & Bell 1928
- I sing Thy birth - Novello 1930
- Communion Service in F minor - Novello 1930
- Bread of Heaven - OUP 1931
- Our Blest Redeemer (York Diocesan Choral Association) - Novello 1932
- Communion Service in G (composed by invitation for the RSCM) - Faith Press 1933
- Hear my crying - Novello 1934
- Light’s glittering morn - Novello 1936
- Christ is our cornerstone (chorus and orchestra - composed by invitation for the Festival of the Sons of the Clergy in St Paul’s Cathedral) - Novello 1936
- That God doth love the world we know - OUP 1937
- Lord of the Harvest - Faith Press 1937
- Te Deum in E flat - Novello 1937
- Magnificat and Nunc Dimittis in G - Novello 1938
- Come, Thou Holy Spirit - Novello 1938
- I will lift up mine eyes - Novello 1940
- Morning and Evening Service in A (Te Deum, Jubilate, Magnificat and Nunc Dimittis) c.1940? (unpublished: hectograph copy of vocal score held in Carlisle Archive Centre ref. DCHA/2/4/11 - organ part is unfortunately missing)
- Magnificat and Nunc Dimittis in E flat - Novello 1941
- Forth in Thy Name - Novello 1947
- The Saints of God - Novello 1947
- Christians, be joyful - Novello 1949
- At the Lamb’s High Feast we sing - OUP 1949
- Come, let us join - Novello 1950
- O Saving Victim - Novello 1950
- Communion Service in E flat - Novello 1952
- Christ is risen from the dead - OUP 1952
- Sing we the Birth - OUP 1956
- And the Lord said to Solomon - c.1958 (unpublished)
- There shall be signs in the sun - Novello 1959
- Cast thy bread upon the waters - Stainer & Bell 1963
- At least nine Anglican chants

=== Songs and Partsongs ===
- Three Songs from Shelley (The Widow Bird; The World’s Wanderers; To Jane) - unpublished MS (c.1907)
- A Farewell (Partsong in Canon) - Novello 1909
- Song of the Bell - Stainer & Bell 1911
- O for the swords of former time - Stainer & Bell 1913
- Far among the lonely hills - Curwen 1913
- The bag of the bee (Partsong in Canon) - Curwen 1915
- Under the green hedges - Year Book Press 1916
- The First Swallow - Joseph Williams 1916
- Hark! ‘tis the breeze - Curwen 1917
- The Daisy’s Song - Curwen 1919
- Heaven overarches earth and sea - Curwen 1920
- Beacons (words by James Walter Brown) - Novello 1920
- The Rain - Edward Arnold 1920
- Hymn to Pan - Curwen 1925
- The Snail - Curwen 1926
- Life, I know not what thou art - Novello 1929
- I loved a lass - Novello 1929
- O mistress mine - Boosey 1929
- The Two Sisters (chorus and orchestra: later included in the Old English Suite) - Novello 1930
- Care for thy soul - Novello 1930
- The Faithless Shepherdess - Year Book Press 1931
- Love is a sickness - Stainer & Bell 1931
- The Butterfly - Novello 1933
- Lo! here, beneath this hallowed shade - Stainer & Bell 1933
- Who killed Cock Robin? - Stainer & Bell 1934
- Fain would I change that note - Boosey 1934
- Birds upward winging (chorus and orchestra - words by T. Dowell) - Boosey 1935
- The Toy Dragon - OUP 1937
- The Jackdaw - Novello 1938
- Beautiful Soup (song from Alice in Wonderland) - Novello 1939
- Abou Ben Adhem - Novello 1941
- Old English Suite (chorus and orchestra - inc. The Two Sisters named above) - Novello 1949
- Oranges and Lemons (SSA Trio arrangement of movement (originally SATB) from the Old English Suite) - Novello 1951
- Welcome, sweet pleasure - Novello 1951
- The Lobster Quadrille (from Alice in Wonderland) - Novello 1955
- Breathes there the man? - Novello 1956
- Bonnie Gallowa’ (arrangement of a melody by G. F. Hornsby) - Bosworth 1956
- The Owl and the Pussy cat - Novello 1958
- The glories of our blood and state - Novello 1963
- The mouse in the wainscot - Novello 1963
- In the dark of Christmas Eve (unpublished - date?)

=== Organ music ===
- Three Short and Easy Postludes - Novello 1917
- Three Short and Easy Postludes - Novello 1922
- Three Period Pieces - Bosworth 1948
- Prologue from Carlisle Historical Pageant arranged for organ (1966; unpublished MS)

=== Large-scale works ===
- An Island King (a light opera: book by H. R. Cowell) - 1902 (unpublished)
- Four songs for contralto with orchestra (The Widow Bird, The Rose Tree, Night Song, Love in a Mist) - unpublished MS (c.1907)
- Three Shelley Lyrics (Serenade, The Story of Proserpine, To the Night)
- Three Nursery Rhymes for chorus and orchestra (Old King Cole, Three Blind Mice, Where are you going to my pretty maid)
- ‘The Merman’ and ‘The Mermaid’ (Tennyson) for chorus and orchestra - c. 1915 (unpublished)
- ‘John o’ Gaunt’ Overture for orchestra - 1917 (unpublished)
- The Prodigal Crusader (a light opera: book by J. S. Eagles) 1924 (privately published)
- Irish Suite for orchestra - 1925 (unpublished)
- Carlisle Historical Pageant (book by J. S. Eagles) - Novello 1928
- Alice in Wonderland (a light opera: book adapted by T. Dowell) - 1938 (privately published)
- A Christmas Carol (book adapted by T. Dowell) - Boosey & Hawkes 1938
- Pickwick Papers (book adapted by T. Dowell) - 1942 (unpublished)
- The Holy Birth (a Nativity Play: words written and selected by Cyril Mayne, Dean of Carlisle) - Novello 1947 (some more music, including a setting of the Benedictus, was written for a later production in 1957)
- Overture (for Carlisle Historical Pageant) for orchestra - 1951 (unpublished)
- The Progress of Learning (a cantata for the Octocentenary of the City of Carlisle - words by V. J. Dunstan, Headmaster of the Grammar School - unpublished (1958)
- In praise of music (for chorus and orchestra) - unpublished

=== Other music ===
- Two movements from the Bach Suites arranged for string orchestra - Boosey 1936
- Miniature Nursery Suite for piano - Curwen 1952
- Creighton School Song (for the Creighton School, Carlisle) - words by W. T. McIntire, music co-written by F. W. Wadely and A. Neesham

Cultural offices
Preceded by Sydney Nicholson	Organist of Carlisle Cathedral; 1910-1960	Succeeded by Robert Andrew Seivewright
