= Museum of Carpet =

Coordinates: 52°23′05″N 2°14′44″W

The Museum of Carpet
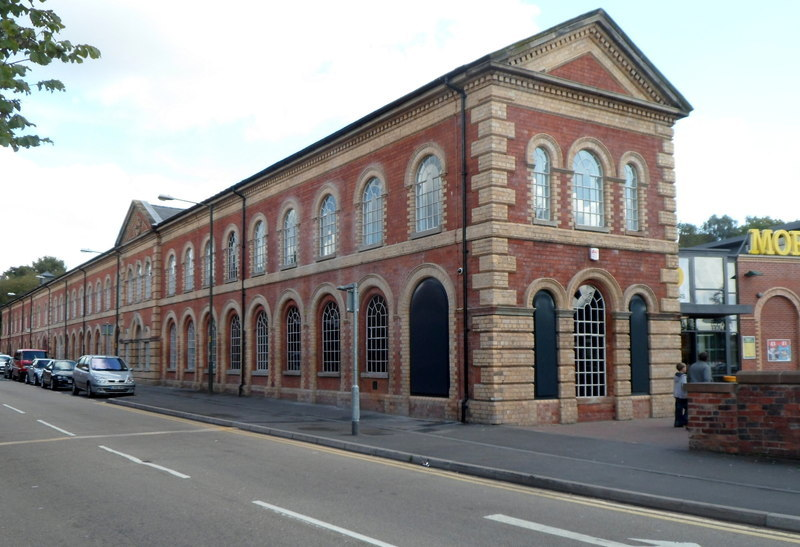
- Established: 2012; 14 years ago
- Location: Kidderminster, Worcestershire, England
- Type: Textiles museum
- Public transit access: Kidderminster railway station
- Website: https://museumofcarpet.org/

The Museum of Carpet is a textile museum in the town of Kidderminster in Worcestershire, England.

== History ==
A Carpet Museum Trust was founded in 1981, with the main aim being to open a public museum. The museum would be for the exhibition of items of local historical and educational interest which is connected to the manufacture of carpets or any other similar textiles. When the industry was shrinking, this enabled the Carpet Museum Trust to collect machinery, artefacts, archives and libraries from several firms in Kidderminster.

On 20 October 2012, the Museum of Carpet was opened to the public, after the museum was formally opened by the Carpet Museum Trust patron Lord Cobham.

Between 11 July and 28 September 2019 there was an exhibition "Woven Forms: Breaking the Boundaries", featuring the work of Jan Bowman which was previously shown at the Saatchi Gallery.

In November 2025 the museum announced it planned to close due to financial issues. The museum closed on 20 December 2025. But it reopened in 2026, two days a week, on Tuesdays and Saturdays, from 10am to 2pm depending on volunteer availability.
