= Ernest Perry (cricketer) =

English cricketer

Personal information
- Full name: Ernest Harvey Perry
- Born: 16 January 1908; Chaddesley Corbett, Worcestershire, England
- Died: 23 October 1996 (aged 88); Kidderminster, Worcestershire, England
- Batting: Right-handed
- Bowling: Right arm fast
- Role: fast bowler

Domestic team information
- Years: Team
- 1933–1946: Worcestershire

Career statistics
Competition	FC
Matches	10
Runs scored	148
Batting average	9.25
100s/50s	0/0
Top score	46
Balls bowled	1,268
Wickets	22
Bowling average	33.27
5 wickets in innings	1
10 wickets in match	0
Best bowling	5-42
Catches/stumpings	3/0
- Source: , 4 August 2008

Ernest Harvey Perry (16 January 1908–23 October 1996) was an English first-class cricketer who played ten games for Worcestershire between 1933 and 1946. He also appeared in the Minor Counties Championship for Staffordshire between 1926 and 1946.

Perry's highest score in first-class cricket was the 46 he made near the end of his career, against Glamorgan in 1946, although in 1934 he had scored 157 for Staffordshire against Cheshire at Stoke-on-Trent. His best first-class bowling return was the 5-42 he claimed in the first innings against Leicestershire at Kidderminster in 1933.
