= Kidderminster Register Office =

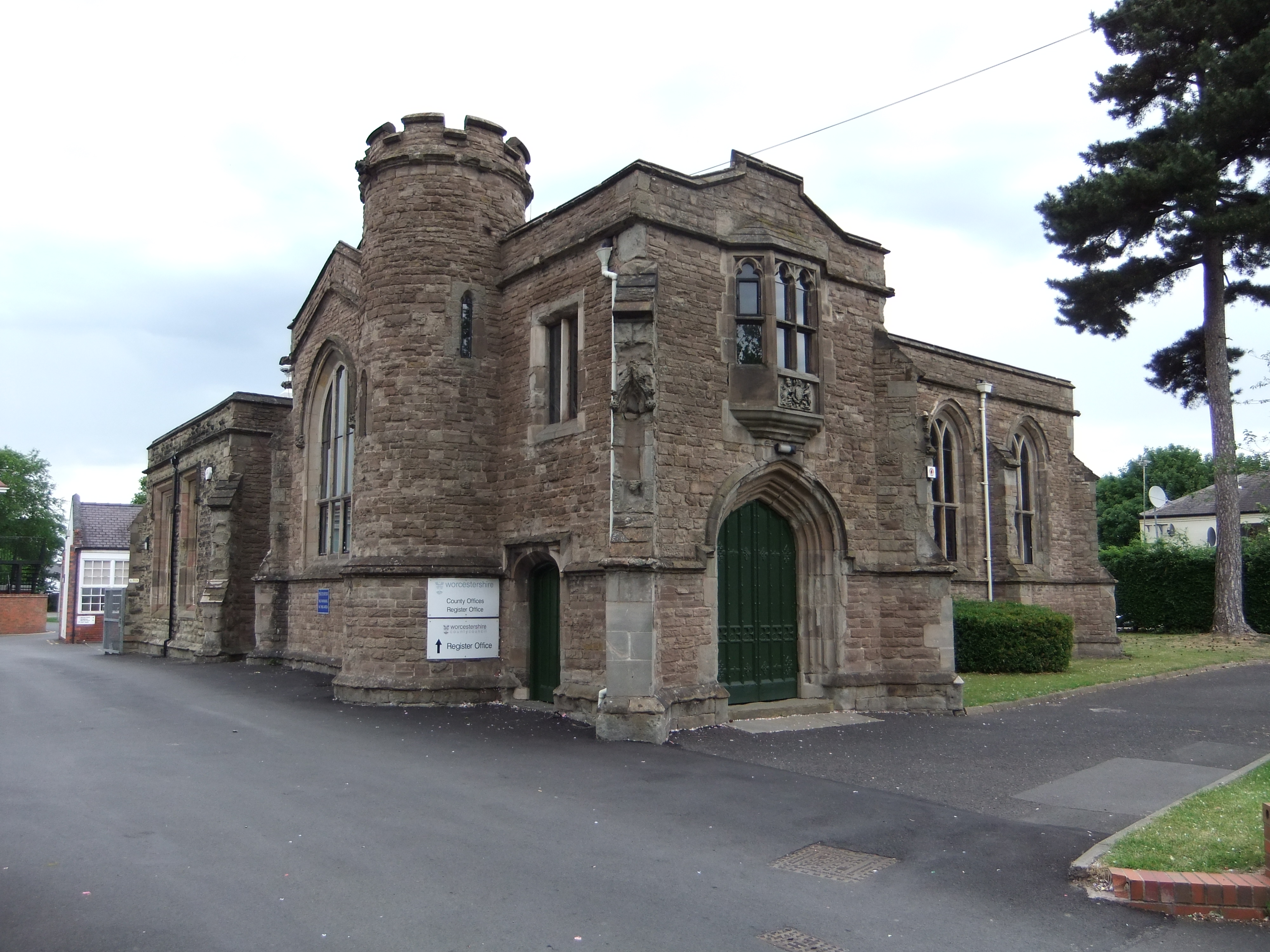
- Interactive map of the Kidderminster Register Office area
- Former names: King Charles I School
- Alternative names: Civic Buildings

General information
- Location: Bewdley Road,, Kidderminster, England
- Coordinates: 52.38762°N 2.25821°W

Kidderminster Register Office is the former Register Office for the town of Kidderminster, Worcestershire, England. As such, it was a designated venue for the performance of civil marriage ceremonies.

The listed building was formerly part of King Charles I School.

== Description ==
The wedding room is over 30 feet (9.1 m) high, and has a beamed and vaulted oak ceiling, oak panelled walls and stone-mullioned high arched windows. The location is now a dance studio and the former grounds and attached education centre has been developed into a small housing estate.
