= Kidderminster Town Hall =

Municipal building in Kidderminster, Worcestershire, England

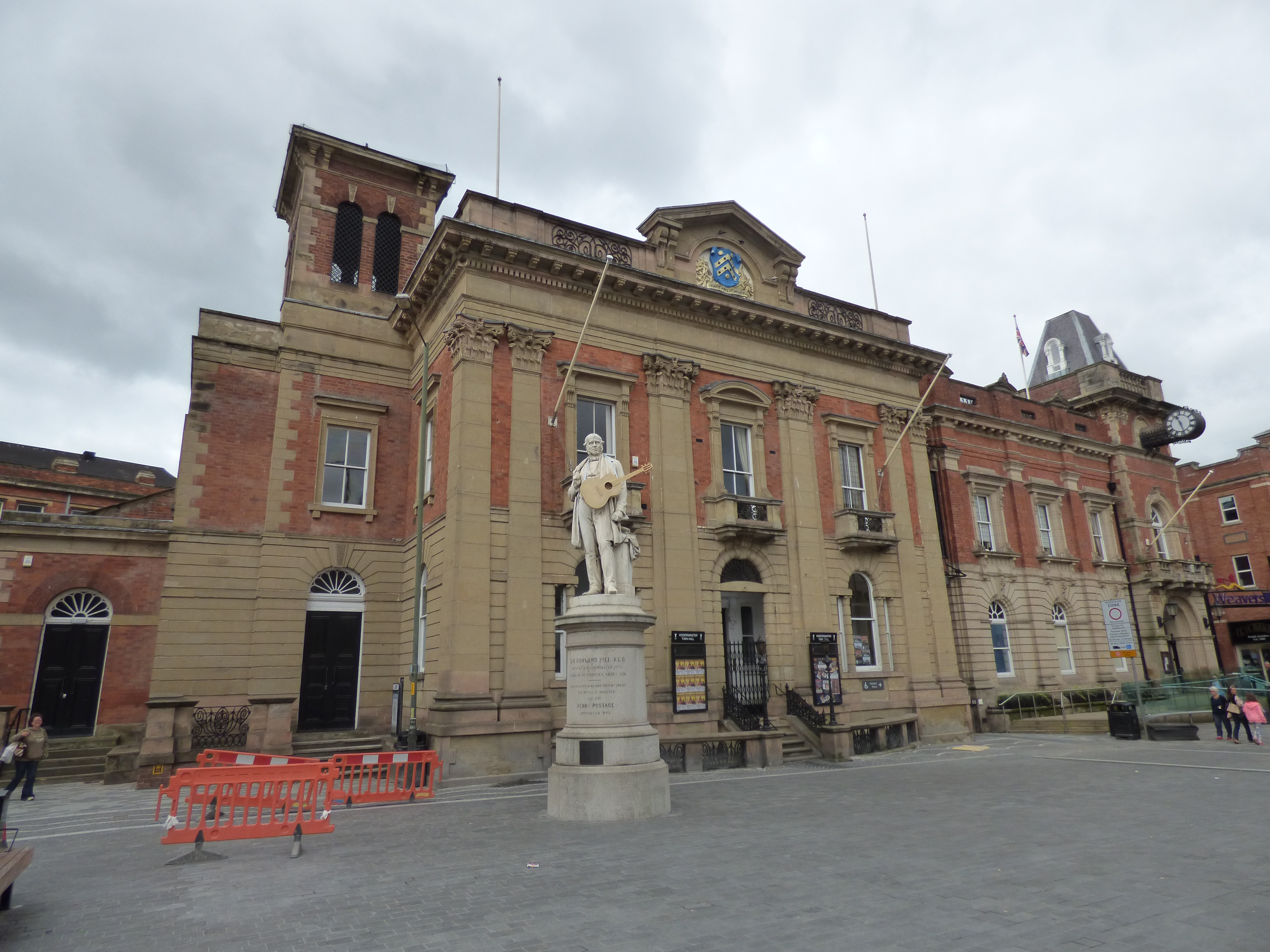
- The Corn Exchange on the left and the Town Hall (with the projecting clock) on the right

- Shown in Worcestershire
- 52.387°N 2.2488°W
- Location: Vicar Street, Kidderminster

History
- Built: 1853–1855; 1876–1877

Site notes
- Architect(s): Bidlake and Lovall; J. T. Meredith
- Architectural style: Neoclassical style
- Website: www.kidderminstertownhall.org.uk

Listed Building – Grade II
- Official name: Public Rooms including the Corn Exchange
- Designated: 17 January 1980
- Reference no.: 1100055

Listed Building – Grade II
- Official name: The Town Hall
- Designated: 17 January 1980
- Reference no.: 1348650

Kidderminster Town Hall is the town hall of Kidderminster, Worcestershire, England. The complex, which includes the corn exchange and the town hall and is the home of Kidderminster Town Council, is grade II listed.

== History ==
The original town hall in Kidderminster was located in the High Street. In the early 1850s, the local member of parliament, Robert Lowe, led an initiative to procure a new civic complex; the site civic leaders selected had previously been occupied by a vicarage.

The earliest part of the current complex is the corn exchange which was designed by Bidlake and Lovall in the neoclassical style and officially opened on 4 January 1855. It was two storeys high and was constructed out of red brick with stone dressings. The design involved a symmetrical main frontage with three bays facing onto Vicar Street with a bell tower to the left; the central bay featured an arched doorway with an iron tympanum; there was a sash window with a balcony on the first floor and a pediment contained the town's coat of arms above. An organ designed and manufactured by William Hill & Sons was installed in the building later in the year. Civic leaders acquired the corn exchange from the original developer, with the intention of creating public rooms for the proposed town hall, in 1875.

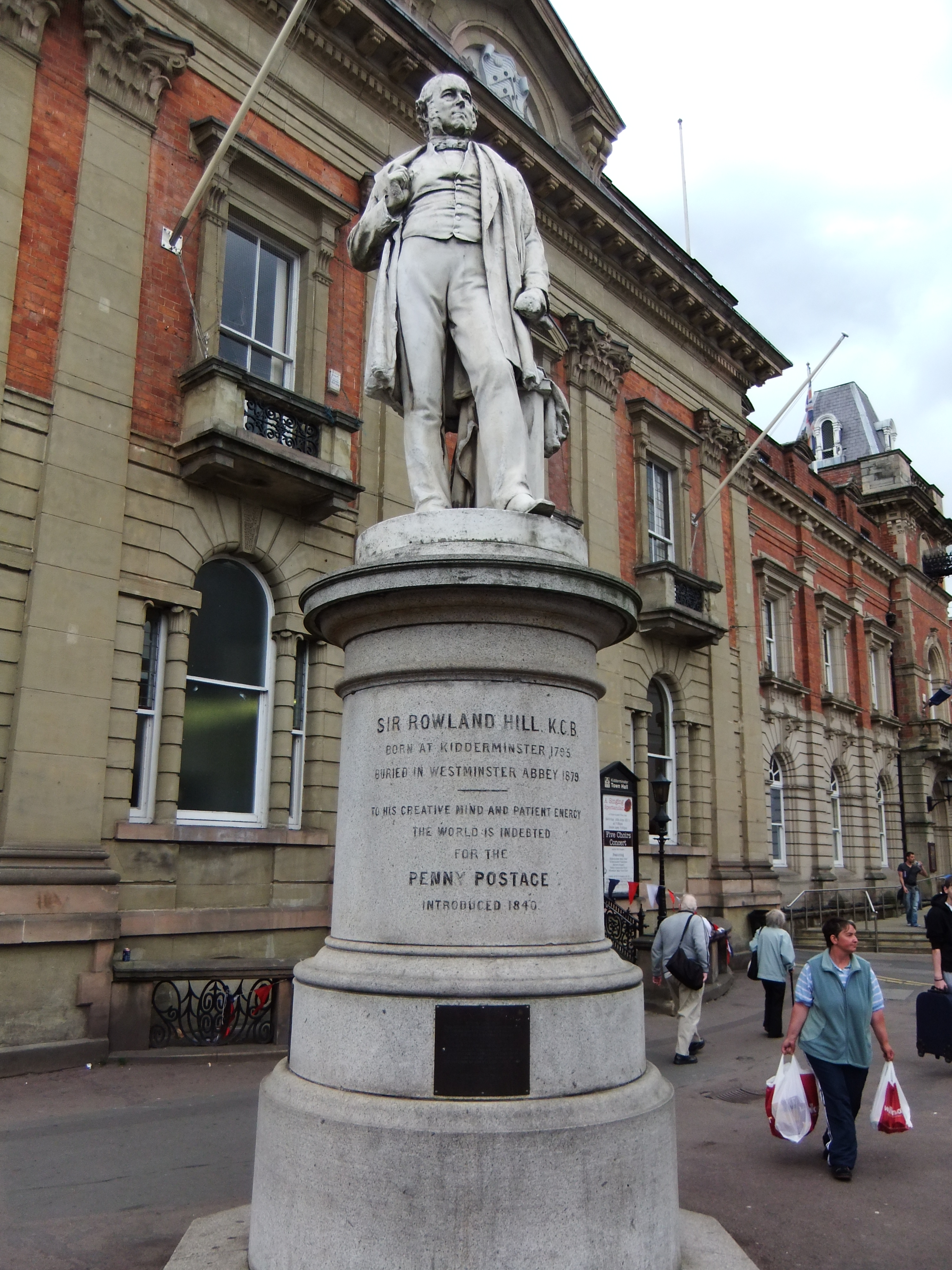
Statue of Sir Rowland Hill, in front of the Town Hall

The new town hall, which was designed by J. T. Meredith in the neoclassical style, was built on an adjacent site between 1876 and 1877. It was also two storeys high and was constructed out of red brick with stone dressings. The design involved an asymmetrical main frontage with four bays facing onto Vicar Street; the right hand bay featured an arched doorway; there was a round headed window with a balcony on the first floor and a projecting clock and a mansard roof above. A statue of Sir Rowland Hill, the locally born Victorian postal reformer, was unveiled in front of the corn exchange in June 1881.

In the early 20th century the complex hosted visits by famous political figures including the future Prime Minister, Winston Churchill, in 1904 and the suffragette, Emmeline Pankhurst in 1912. In 1943, during the Second World War, a plaque was unveiled in the town hall entrance to commemorate the borough's fund raising achievements during Wings for Victory Week.

The town hall continued to be used as a public venue and concert performers included the contralto singer Kathleen Ferrier, who made an appearance on 16 April 1947. Other famous acts have performed there, including The Rolling Stones in 1964 and The Who in 1966; The Animals also performed in the mid-1960s and U2 performed there in November 1980.

The building was the headquarters of Kidderminster Borough Council for much of the 20th century but ceased to be the local seat of government when the enlarged Wyre Forest District Council was formed in 1974. The complex gained grade II listing in 1980.

In 2015 ownership of the complex was passed from Wyre Forest District Council to the newly created Kidderminster Town Council and in 2019 the town council took over the management of the complex as part of a localism agenda. In May 2019 the town council was awarded a £49,700 grant from the National Lottery Heritage Fund to explore the hidden history of the hall and explore possible development options to make the hall more sustainable. In July 2020 the town council received £26,000 in funding from Arts Council England.

Works of art in the complex include a portrait by Anthony van Dyck of King Charles I.
