= King Charles I School =

Location
- Hill Grove House, Comberton Road, Kidderminster, Worcestershire, DY10 1XA, United Kingdom

Information
- Type: Comprehensive; Academy
- Motto: "Achieving Together" (shared by all schools in the Four Stones Gateway Trust)
- Established: 1566 (original foundation); 1636; 390 years ago (charter granted)
- Founder: Thomas Blount
- Department for Education URN: 138032 Tables
- Ofsted: Reports
- Chair of Local Academy Board ("Governors"): Ian Setchell
- Headteacher: Ruth Allen
- Gender: Coeducational
- Age: 11 to 18
- Enrolment: 1,052
- Houses: Blounts; Chads; Queens
- Former pupils: Old Carolians
- Website: King Charles I School

King Charles I School is a coeducational secondary school and sixth form located in the town of Kidderminster, Worcestershire, England.

== Present day and Ofsted ==
King Charles I School is a specialist science college, and renewed its specialist status in September 2009. In September 2011, King Charles I School was inspected by Ofsted inspectors during a 2-day section 5 inspection. The inspection deemed the school to be "good, grade 2" (1 being "outstanding", 2 "good", 3 "satisfactory" and 4 "inadequate"), stating: "King Charles 1 [sic] is a good school that puts students at the heart of everything it does". However, the inspectors lowered the previous grade of the Sixth Form, from "good" in the 2008 report, to "satisfactory", stating: "[S]tandards have fluctuated since the school was last inspected but students make satisfactory progress".

== History ==
=== Grammar school ===
The school was founded around 1566 by Thomas Blount, Esq, Lord of the Manor of Kidderminster. It was in the chantry of the Parish Church of Saint Mary and All Saints from 1566 until 1848, when it moved to the site known as Woodfield, on Bewdley Road. It was granted its royal charter in 1636 by King Charles I and was the only school in England to bear his name. The original premises, Woodfield House built in 1785, and the Hall built about 1848, are now listed buildings.

=== Comprehensive ===
When administered by Hereford and Worcester County Council in 1977, the Queen Elizabeth I Grammar School, Hartlebury (all boys) merged with the two Kidderminster grammar schools, King Charles I Grammar School for Boys, and the Kidderminster High School for Girls, the latter of which was founded in 1868, and moved in 1912 to Hill Grove House, which is now also a Grade II listed building.

This marked the end of the grammar school system in Kidderminster, as the change to comprehensive education was completed. The transition to this system took place gradually until the early 1980s, becoming a ten-form (five-form each in Years 12 and 13) entry, 13–18 comprehensive school from a six-form entry grammar school.

=== Mergers ===
It has been subject to several mergers, and, in line with district school reorganisation, following an amalgamation of middle schools and high schools, it reopened in 2007 to operate from two sites, with a total capacity of around 1350 students aged 11 to 18. Under its new structure, the school retains its specialist status as a Science College that was awarded in 2003, and has facilities that cater for students with special needs. Following a November 2011 Ofsted inspection, the school was awarded a grade 2 ("good") rating.

=== Buildings ===
The school was enlarged with the Brooks Building, neighbouring the Sixth Form Rose Garden, which originally functioned as a science laboratory and theatre, and is now a conference centre. The school has two sites, with the lower school for Years 7 and 8 pupils operating from the premises of the former Comberton Middle School on Borrington Road. On both sites, the school caters for linguistically challenged and autistic students in a Communication Centre.

=== Academy ===
The school converted to academy status in August 2012.

== Curriculum ==
The school offers a wide range of extra-curricular provision, especially in sport. In July 1979, the school held the Guinness world record for the longest continuous cricket match.

== Notable alumni ==
=== King Charles I School (since 1977) ===
- Steven Davies, English cricketer, formerly of Worcestershire, now playing for Surrey
- Tom Watson, Labour MP from 2001 to 2019 for West Bromwich East

=== King Charles I Grammar School for Boys (until 1977) ===
- Mo Anthoine, mountaineer
- Alan Bowkett, businessman
- Paul Frampton, physicist
- Lt-Col Brian Turner Tom Lawrence, conferee of the Victoria Cross during the Boer War
- Walter Nash, Prime Minister of New Zealand
- Clifford T. Ward, singer-songwriter
- Charles Wood, playwright and scriptwriter

=== Kidderminster High School for Girls (until 1977) ===
- Stephanie Bidmead, actress, notably in Doctor Who
- Mal Lewis Jones, author
- Monica Jones, partner of poet Philip Larkin
- Debra Shipley, Labour MP from 1997 to 2005 for Stourbridge

== See also ==
- List of English and Welsh endowed schools (19th century)
- Kidderminster Register Office
