= Caldwall Castle =

Ruined ancient manor house

- Worcestershire, England
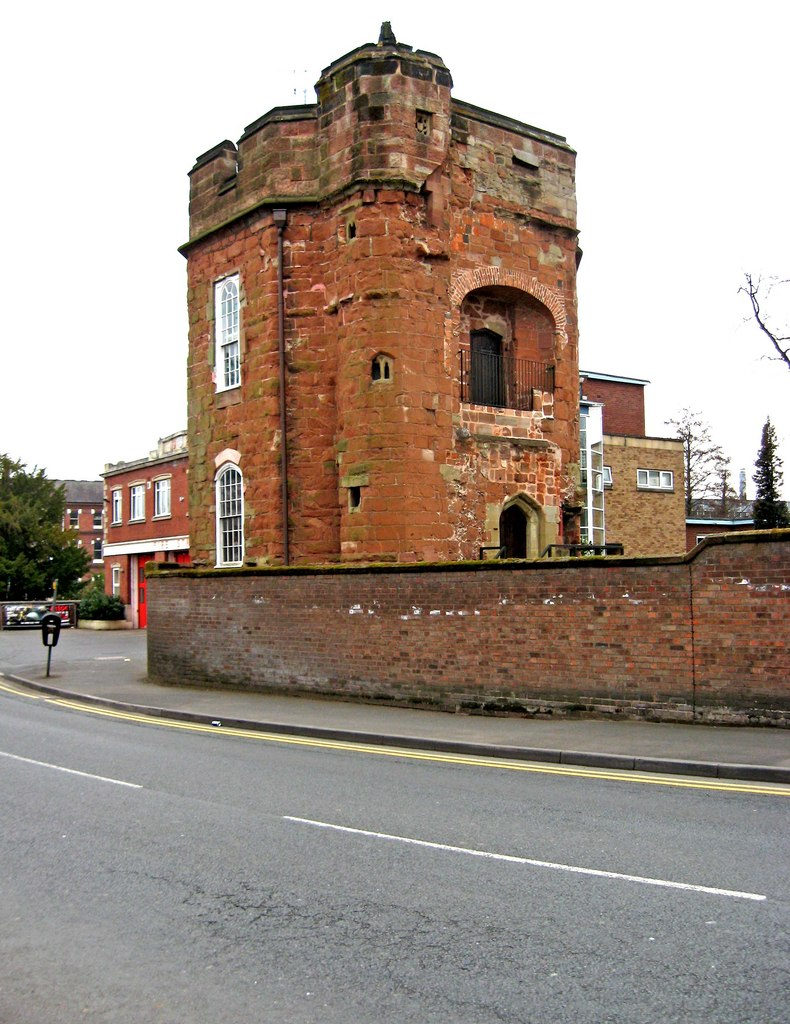
- The surviving tower, known as Caldwall Tower

Site information
- Type: Manor house
- Open to the public: No
- Condition: Ruined

Location
- Shown within Worcestershire.
- Coordinates: 52.383656°N 2.250161°W
- Grid reference: grid reference SO716927

Site history
- Built: c. 1335 – 1347
- In use: 1347 – 1897 and 1990 – present (as a residence)
- Materials: Red sandstone

Caldwall Castle, also spelt Caldwell Castle and now known as Caldwall Tower, is a former manor house in the town of Kidderminster in Worcestershire, England and only a single tower remains today. It is a Grade II* listed building. The layout of Caldwall Castle, a courtyard with four surrounding towers, was likely similar to that of Stokesay Castle in Shropshire.

== History ==
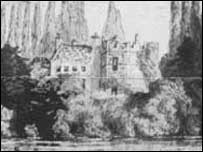
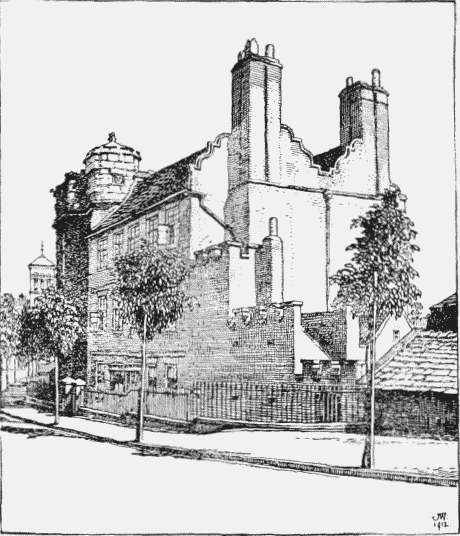
Caldwall Castle, seen from the west, in 1846, by Cuthbert Bede (top) and Caldwall Castle, seen from the north, in 1912 by J.W. (bottom)

The first structure was built during the fourteenth century, between c. 1335 and 1347, by Sir Hugh de Cokesay. Caldwall Castle was owned by the Cokesay family until it was passed to the Wyntour family in 1498. Under the Wyntours, the manor house was rebuilt sometime during the early fifteenth or sixteenth century and the present structure, known as Caldwall Tower, also dates to this time. The Wyntour family eventually sold Caldwall Castle in 1589 to the de Clare family. Around 1690, a three-storey brick-built structure was built to connect the surviving tower to the north-west side, and the entire building was renovated during the seventeenth century.

The manor house was passed to the Jeffrey family in 1777 and it was acquired by George Turton in 1864; when he died in 1897, the Corporation of Kidderminster took control of the estate and used it for many different purposes, such as a school of domestic science, government offices, the municipal fire station and an air raid protection headquarters, before Caldwall Castle was left derelict until it was demolished in 1961, leaving only the surviving tower standing. In 1990, the tower was sold to Richard and Nely Davies and it is now used as a private residence. Richard Davies has also since extensively restored the tower.
