= St Mary and All Saints' Church, Kidderminster =

Church in Worcestershire, England

St Mary's, Kidderminster
- St Mary and All Saints, Kidderminster
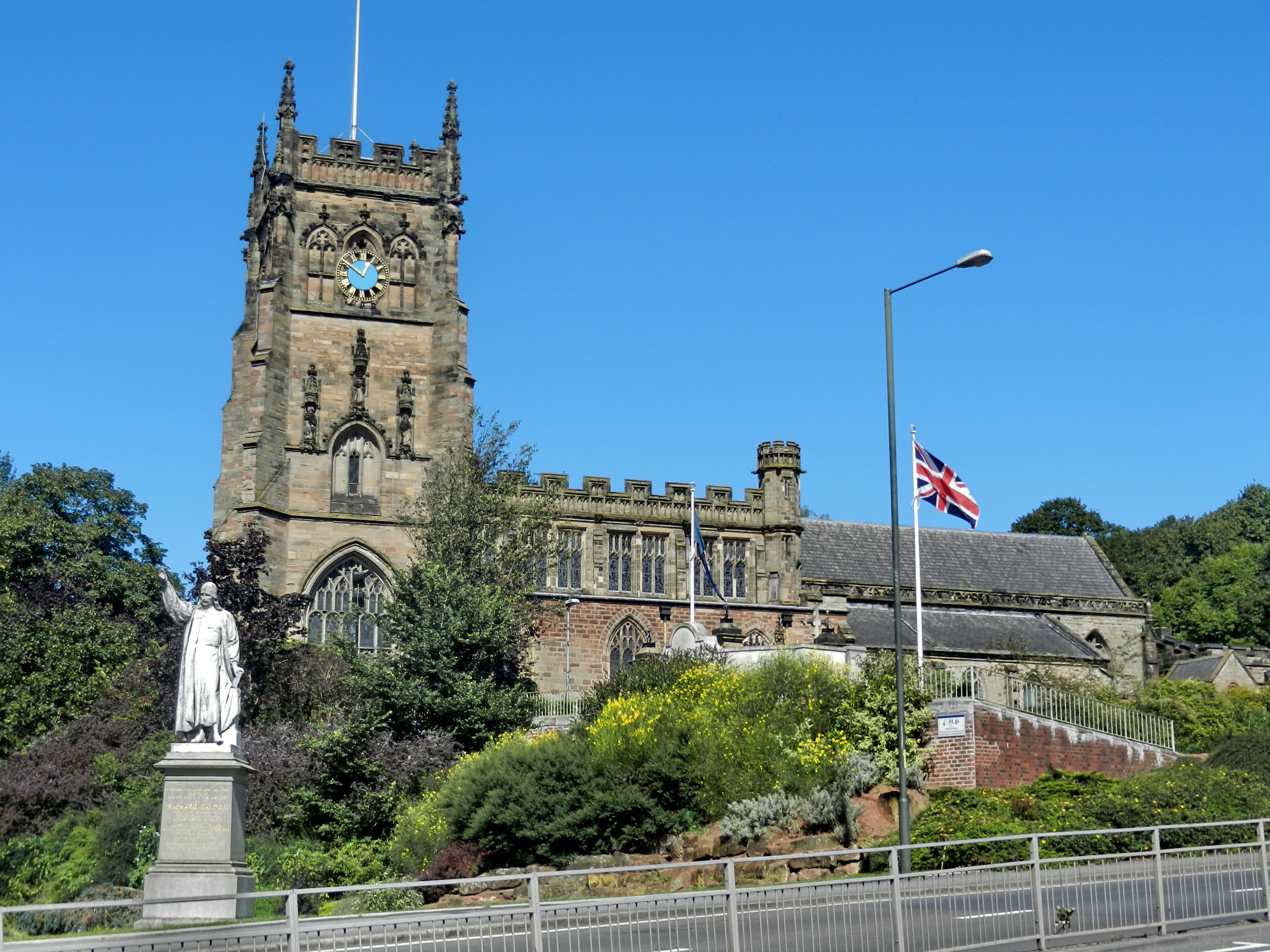
- St Mary's church, Kidderminster
- St Mary's, Kidderminster
- 52°23′25.11″N 2°15′2.83″W
- Location: Kidderminster
- Country: England
- Denomination: Church of England
- Website: https://www.achurchnearyou.com/church/18775/

History
- Dedication: St Mary All Saints'

Architecture
- Heritage designation: Grade I listed
- Designated: 20 October 1952

Specifications
- Length: 215 feet (66 m)

Administration
- Diocese: Diocese of Worcester
- Archdeaconry: Dudley
- Deanery: Kidderminster
- Parish: Kidderminster Ismere

Clergy
- Priest: The Ven Hayward Osborne

St Mary and All Saints’ Church, Kidderminster is a Grade I listed Major Parish Church in the Church of England in Kidderminster, Worcestershire, England.

== History ==
The foundation existed at the time of the Domesday Book in 1086. Records of a consecration in 1315 probably refer to the chancel. The current church building dates mostly from the 15th and 16th centuries.

in April 1641, during the English Civil War, the vicar George Dance, agreed that he would give £60 a year, out of his income of £200, to a preacher who should be chosen by certain trustees. Richard Baxter was invited to deliver a sermon before the people, and was unanimously elected as the minister, or lecturer, of St Mary and All Saints' Church, Kidderminster.

In 1847 a new entrance to the body of the church was provided underneath the tower through an arch which had formerly been blocked up. The western galleries were removed. Another entrance was provided to the south aisle through an archway in the eastern side of the tower. The church retained its galleries in the aisles. The new aisle formed a continuation of the southern aisle and was pewed with open sittings of oak. It was divided from the chancel by a row of pillars. The door leading from the vestry into the chancel was the gift of the architect Harvey Eginton. The monuments in the church were cleaned and restored, and the reredos was painted by Mr. Margetts of Oxford.

The organ chamber was added in 1874. The tower was refaced in 1893–1895 by J. A. Chatwin.

The Whittall Chapel was added in 1921-1922 by Giles Gilbert Scott. Hubert Clist undertook some work in 1966–1967. Ronald Sims re-ordered the interior in 1988–1990.

St Mary and All Saints is the civic Church of Kidderminster and forms part of the Kidderminster Ismere team of churches which includes St John Wolverley, Holy Trinity Trimpley, St Barnabas Franche, St Oswald Broadwaters, St Peter Upper Arley and St Peter Cookley.

== Organ ==
In 1846 a decision was taken to obtain a new organ as the existing one was placed at the west end of the church and impeded the view of the window. The congregation also wanted the organ moved to support a new choir which was engaged to perform full cathedral services on Sundays. The new organ by George Holdich was opened by Dr. Marshall (organist of St Mary’s) on 7 June 1848.

There have been subsequent rebuildings and renovations over the years, resulting in a 3-manual and pedal pipe organ. The organ case was added in 1927 – 1928 by Giles Gilbert Scott. A specification of the organ can be found on the National Pipe Organ Register.

A separate pipe organ is situated in the Whitall Memorial Chapel. A specification of the organ can be found on the National Pipe Organ Register.

=== Organists ===
*Mr. Fletcher ca. 1813 - 1843 (afterwards organist at St Mary's Church, Handsworth)
- Mrs. W.H. Fletcher 1843
- Dr. William Marshall 1846 - 1868 (formerly organist at Christ Church, Oxford)
- William Taylor 1868 - 1903 (formerly organist of St John's Church, Kidderminster)
- Alfred Chatfield 1903 - 1949 (formerly organist at St Paul’s Church, Finchley)
- Mr. Lashford ca. 1952
- Angela Cattanach-Chell ca. 1983 ca. 1984
- Stanley Mitchell 1985 - 2003
- David Morgan 2006-2013
- James Bradley 2013 - ?
- Graeme Martin (previously Director of Music 2004 - 2006)

== Bells ==
By 1774 the church had a peal of 8 bells. The 1st, 6th and 7th had been cast at Gloucester in 1754. On 1 May 1856 the 8th bell was broken and it was recast in 1857 by Mears of London.

The great gale of October 1881 did much damage to the tower. It was decided that the restoration of the tower was urgent and work started immediately. As part of this restoration, new floors were inserted under the bells and for a clock chamber. A new frame was erected for the rehanging of the bells and this work was carried out by J. Taylor and Sons of Loughborough. Three new fixed bells were added to the set of carillon chimes which were presented to the town by the Freemasons of the district. The chimes played every third hour, being set on the eleven bells. The chiming mechanism had a change of three barrels, two of which had 14 secular tunes, and the other one had 7 sacred tunes. The clock chiming mechanism which had formerly been a ting-tang (?) was replaced with Westminster chimes. There was also a barrel for chiming 182 changes and rounds on the old eight bells.

The tower today contains a ring of 12 bells with the addition of a flat 6th bell which were cast in 2003 by John Taylor of Loughborough and dedicated on 29 February 2004. The tenor weight is 2,856 pounds (1,295 kg).

== Clock ==
A new clock was made in 1828 by Henry Knight of Birmingham. It was reported to be an eight-day clock with a great wheel two feet in diameter. The pendulum weighed 100 pounds (45 kg) and the pendulum was 13 feet (4.0 m) long, which oscillated only 30 times per minute. An additional dial was placed on the west side of the tower. In 1852 the clock was repaired. Mr. Fairer was appointed at a salary of £6 per annum to wind the clock at St Mary’s, and also that at St George’s. However, the clock does not appear to have been satisfactory as just over a year later a subscription was launched for the erection of a new clock. By June 1856, James Harrison of Hull was installing a new clock at a cost of £140 (equivalent to £13,000 in 2025) which was designed to strike the quarters. The church proposed to give the old one to St John's Church, Kidderminster.
