= Matthew Steele =

Scottish architect (1878–1937)

- Born: Matthew Steele; 19 February 1878; Bo'ness, Scotland, United Kingdom
- Died: 12 December 1937 (aged 59); Bo'ness, Scotland, United Kingdom
- Occupation: Architect
- Buildings: Hippodrome Cinema, Bo'ness

Matthew Steele (19 February 1878 – 12 December 1937) was a Scottish architect, who worked principally in his hometown of Bo'ness and the surrounding area. He was an architectural designer in the Arts and Crafts and Art Deco design movements and designed The Hippodrome Cinema, thought to be the oldest such building surviving in Scotland. He died in Bo'ness from pneumonia in 1937.

== Selected works ==
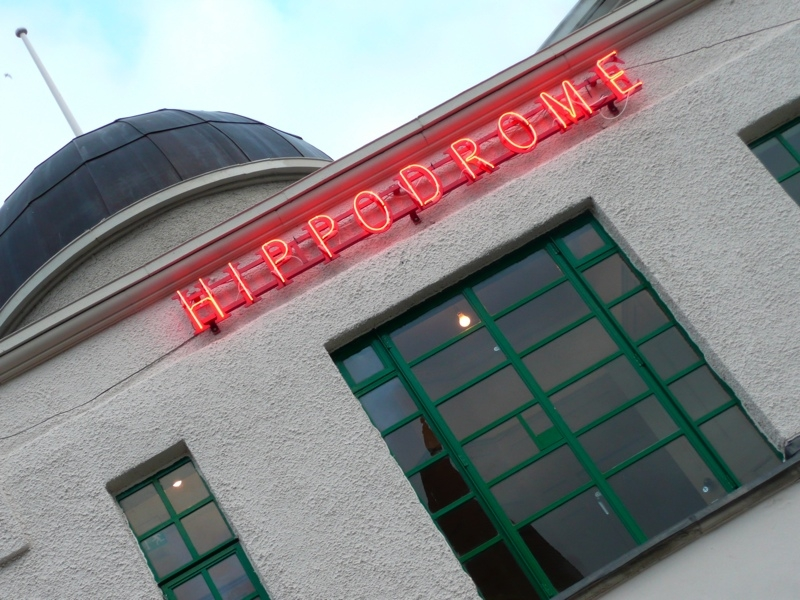
Hippodrome Cinema in Bo'ness
