= Michelin Ground =

Defunct cricket ground in Stoke-on-Trent, Staffordshire

Ground information
- Location: Stoke-on-Trent, Staffordshire
- Coordinates: 52.9896°N 2.1878°W
- Establishment: 1928 (first recorded match)

Team information
Staffordshire	(1928-1951)
Minor Counties	(1953)
- As of 14 August 2010; Source: Ground profile

Michelin Ground was a cricket ground in Stoke-on-Trent, Staffordshire. The ground was built and owned by the Michelin Tyre Company and was located along Campbell Road. Its location today would be next to the bridge halfway along Campbell Road which passes over the A500 road.

The first recorded match on the ground was in 1928, when Staffordshire played Lincolnshire in the grounds first Minor Counties Championship match. From 1928 to 1951, the ground hosted 29 Minor Counties Championship matches, with the final Minor Counties Championship match held on the ground in 1951 with Northumberland as the opposition.

In 1937, Staffordshire played the touring New Zealanders, with the New Zealanders winning by 158 runs.

A combined Minor Counties team used the ground for a single first-class match 1953 against the touring Australians. The ground is now part of the Michelin sports complex and the cricket pitch has moved to another location on this large site.
