= The Shuttle (newspaper) =

British newspaper

- Type: Weekly newspaper
- Format: Tabloid
- Owner: Newsquest Media Group
- Editor: Alicia Kelly
- Founded: 1870
- Headquarters: Kidderminster; England
- Circulation: 7,740 (as of 2024)
- Website: kidderminstershuttle.co.uk

The Shuttle, formerly known as the Kidderminster Shuttle, is a weekly newspaper available in the Wyre Forest area of Worcestershire, England, on a Thursday. In the Stourport area it was known as the Stourport News, and there was also a paid-for edition, the Kidderminster Times; all three papers have had identical editorial content since 2005 although each had its own masthead front page until April 2006. Since then all three papers have been renamed as The Shuttle incorporating the Kidderminster Shuttle, the Kidderminster Times and the Stourport News. The local office in Stourport was closed at the same time.

The paper remains a local institution in the Kidderminster area, notably with its in-depth coverage of local politics and Kidderminster Harriers F.C.

The Shuttle was first published in the 19th century, and takes its name from the weaving shuttle used by the carpet industry for which Kidderminster is known.

As of 2025, the editor of the Shuttle is Alicia Kelly .

The newspaper is owned by Newsquest Media Group which was acquired by the Gannett corporation in 1999. The Newsquest head office is based in Weybridge, Surrey and employs a total of more than 9,100 people across the UK.

== History ==
In 1900, the newspaper was purchased by Alfred Iliffe, who changed its name to The Worcester Daily and Weekly Times. Iliffe also acquired several other newspapers in the area and merged them into the Worcester group. In 1921, the newspaper was renamed The Worcester Evening News and continued to be published daily.

Throughout its history, The Shuttle was known for its coverage of local news and events in Worcester and the surrounding areas. It also covered national and international news, as well as sports, entertainment, and other topics. The newspaper was particularly influential during the First and Second World Wars, when it provided extensive coverage of the conflicts and supported the war effort. It also played a role in promoting social and political reform, such as women's suffrage and labor rights.

In 2009, the newspaper carried advertisements on both its online and print editions from the British National Party, resulting in a letter of complaint by a member of the National Union of Journalists.
