= Chiral color =

Speculative model

In particle physics phenomenology, chiral color is a speculative model which extends quantum chromodynamics (QCD), the generally accepted theory for the strong interactions of quarks. QCD is a gauge field theory based on a gauge group known as color SU(3)_{C} with an octet of colored gluons acting as the force carriers between a triplet of colored quarks.

In Chiral Color, QCD is extended to a gauge group which is SU(3)_{L} × SU(3)_{R} and leads to a second octet of force carriers. SU(3)_{C} is identified with a diagonal subgroup of these two factors. The gluons correspond to the unbroken gauge bosons and the color octet axigluons – which couple strongly to the quarks – are massive. Hence the name is Chiral Color. Although Chiral Color has presently no experimental support, it has the "aesthetic" advantage of rendering the Standard Model more similar in its treatment of the two short range forces, strong and weak interactions.

Unlike gluons, the axigluons are predicted to be massive. Extensive searches for axigluons at CERN and Fermilab have placed a lower bound on the axigluon mass of about 1 TeV. Axigluons may be discovered when collisions are studied with higher energy at the Large Hadron Collider.
