= Viscount Palmerston =

Title in the peerage of Ireland

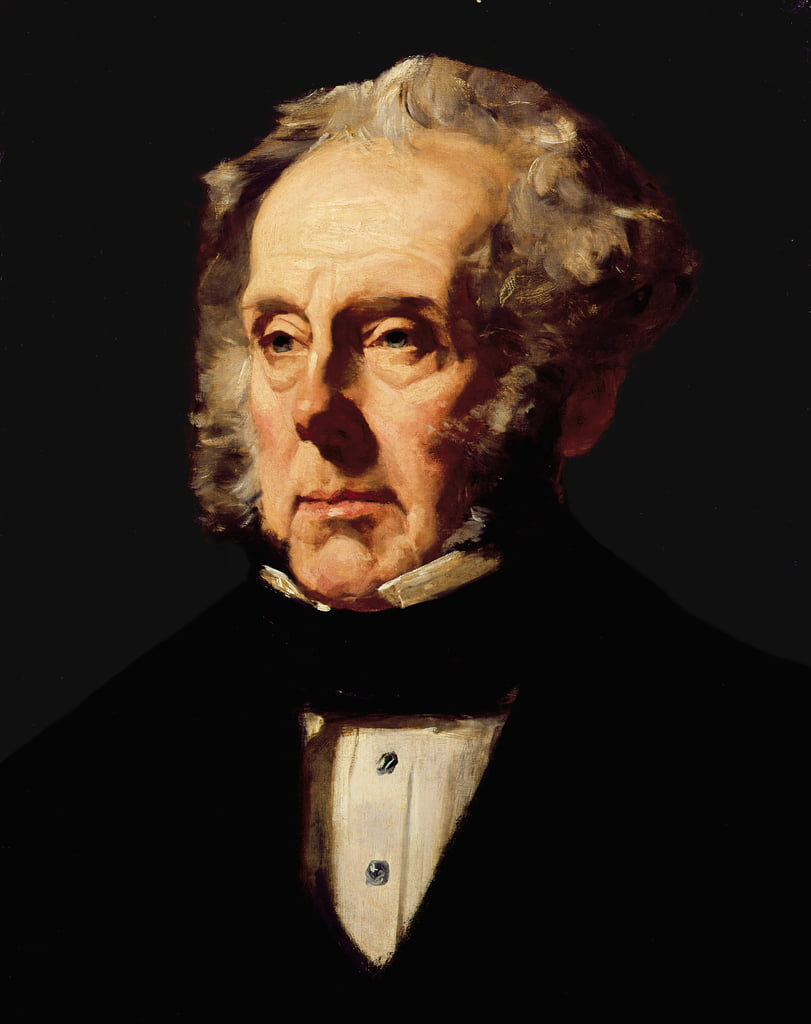
Henry John Temple, 3rd Viscount Palmerston.

Viscount Palmerston was a title in the Peerage of Ireland. The title is derived from Palmerstown in Ireland, which was also known as Palmerston. The name is the origin of several place names in Australia, Canada, New Zealand, and other former British possessions. It was created on 12 March 1723 for Henry Temple, who subsequently represented East Grinstead, Bossiney and Weobley in the British House of Commons. He was made Baron Temple, of Mount Temple in the County of Sligo, at the same time, also in the Peerage of Ireland. He was succeeded by his grandson, the 2nd Viscount, who represented seven constituencies in the House of Commons and served as a Lord of the Admiralty and Lord of the Treasury. On his death the titles passed to his son, the 3rd Viscount, who became a distinguished politician and served three times as Foreign Secretary and twice as Prime Minister of the United Kingdom. At his death in 1865 the 3rd Viscount was granted a state funeral, the fourth non-royal to be given this honour. Lord Palmerston was childless and the barony and viscountcy became extinct on his death.

The Temple family descended from Peter Temple, of Dorset and Marston Boteler. His eldest son John Temple acquired the Stowe estate in Buckinghamshire and founded the English branch of the family from whom the Viscounts Cobham, the Dukes of Buckingham and Chandos and the Earls Temple of Stowe are descended. Peter Temple's younger son Anthony Temple was the founder of the Irish branch of the family from whom the Viscounts Palmerston descended. His son Sir William Temple (1555–1627) was secretary to Sir Philip Sidney and the Earl of Essex and afterwards provost of Trinity College Dublin. Sir William's son, Sir John Temple (1600–1677), was Master of the Rolls in Ireland. The latter was the father of Sir William Temple, a diplomat, and Sir John Temple (1632–1704), Speaker of the Irish House of Commons and father of the first Viscount Palmerston.

The third Viscount Palmerston married the Honourable Emily Lamb, sister of Prime Minister Lord Melbourne and widow of Peter Clavering-Cowper, 5th Earl Cowper. Emily's second son from her first marriage, the Honourable William Cowper, inherited parts of his stepfather's estates, including Broadlands near Romsey in Hampshire, and assumed the additional surname of Temple. In 1880 he was raised to the peerage as Baron Mount Temple, a revival of the junior title held by the Viscounts Palmerston. He was childless and the peerage became extinct on his death in 1888. However, it was revived once again in 1932 in favour of his great-nephew, Wilfrid Ashley. He had no sons however and the title became extinct again upon his death in 1938. His daughter, the Honourable Edwina, wife of Lord Louis Mountbatten, inherited Broadlands.

== Viscounts Palmerston (1723) ==
- Henry Temple, 1st Viscount Palmerston (c. 1673–1757)
- Henry Temple, 2nd Viscount Palmerston (1739–1802)
- Henry John Temple, 3rd Viscount Palmerston (1784–1865)

== Family tree ==
Family tree of the Duke of Buckingham and Chandos, Marquess of Buckingham, Marquess of Chandos, Viscount Cobham, Earl Temple, Earl Temple of Stowe, Baron Cobham, Baron Grenville, Baron Lyttelton, Baron Westcote and Temple baronets

Peter Temple
Anthony Temple	John Temple
Baronet, of Stowe, in the County of Buckingham, 1611
William Temple; 1555–1627	Thomas Temple; 1567–1637; 1st Baronet, of Stowe	Alexander Temple; 1583–1629
Baronet, of Frankley, in the County of Worcester, 1618
John Temple; 1600–1677	Peter Temple; 1592–1653; 2nd Baronet, of Stowe	John Temple; 1593–1632	James Temple; 1606–1680	Thomas Lyttelton; 1593–1650; 1st Baronet, of Frankley
Baronet, of Stowe, in the County of Buckingham, 1662
Thomas Temple; 1613/14–1674; 1st Baronet, of Stowe	Peter Temple; 1613–1660	Henry Lyttelton; 1624–1693; 2nd Baronet, of Frankley	Charles Lyttelton; 1628–1716; 3rd Baronet, of Frankley
Baronetcy of Stowe (1662 creation) extinct, 1674
John Temple; 1632–1705	Richard Temple; 1634–1697; 3rd Baronet, of Stowe	Eleanor Temple d. 1729 m. Richard Grenville	William Temple d. 1706
Viscount Palmerston and Baron Temple, of Mount Temple in the County of Sligo, 1723	Baron Cobham, of Cobham in the County of Kent (6th creation), 1714; Viscount Cobham and Baron Cobham, of Cobham in the County of Kent (7th creation), 1718	Earl Temple, 1749
Henry Temple c. 1673–1757; 1st Viscount Palmerston and Baron Temple	Richard Temple; 1675–1749; 1st Viscount Cobham and Baron Cobham, 4th Baronet, of Stowe	Hester Grenville c. 1690–1752; 1st Countess Temple, 2nd Viscountess Cobham and 2nd Baroness Cobham	Richard Grenville; 1678–1727	Christian Temple	Thomas Lyttelton; 1686–1751; 4th Baronet, of Frankley	William Temple; 1694–1760; 5th Baronet, of Stowe	Peter Temple d. 1761; 6th Baronet, of Stowe
Barony of Cobham (1714 creation) extinct, 1749
Henry, Lord Temple	Richard Temple; 1731–1786; 7th Baronet, of Stowe
Baron Lyttelton (1st creation), 1756	Baron Westcote, 1776; Baron Lyttelton (2nd creation), 1794	Baronetcy of Stowe dormant, 1786
Henry Temple; 1739–1802; 2nd Viscount Palmerston and Baron Temple	Richard Grenville-Temple; 1711–1779; 2nd Earl Temple, 3rd Viscount Cobham and Baron Cobham	George Grenville; 1712–1770	Hester Grenville; 1720–1803; Baroness Chatham m. William Pitt the Elder, Earl of Chatham and Viscount Pitt	George Lyttelton; 1709–1773; 1st Baron Lyttelton, 5th Baronet, of Frankley	William Henry Lyttelton; 1724–1808; 1st Baron Lyttelton
Marquess of Buckingham (2nd creation), 1784	Baron Grenville, of Wotton under Bernewood in the County of Buckingham, 1790
George Nugent-Temple-Grenville; 1753–1813; 1st Marquess of Buckingham, 3rd Earl Temple, 2nd Earl Nugent, 4th Viscount Cobham and Baron Cobham	William Wyndham Grenville; 1759–1834; 1st Baron Grenville	William Pitt the Younger; 1759–1806	Thomas Lyttelton; 1744–1779; 2nd Baron Lyttelton, 5th Baronet, of Frankley
Barony of Grenville extinct, 1834	Barony of Lyttelton and Baronetcy of Frankley extinct, 1779
Duke of Buckingham and Chandos, Marquess of Chandos and Earl Temple of Stowe, 1822
Henry John Temple; 1784–1865; 3rd Viscount Palmerston and Baron Temple	Richard Temple-Nugent-Brydges-Chandos-Grenville; 1776–1839; 1st Duke of Buckingham and Chandos, Marquess of Chandos, and Earl Temple of Stowe, 2nd Marquess of Buckingham, 3rd Earl Nugent, 4th Earl Temple, 5th Viscount Cobham and Baron Cobham	George Fulke Lyttelton; 1763–1828; 2nd Baron Lyttelton	William Henry Lyttelton; 1782–1837; 3rd Baron Lyttelton
Richard Plantagenet Temple-Nugent-Brydges-Chandos-Grenville; 1797–1861; 2nd Duke of Buckingham and Chandos, Marquess of Chandos, and Earl Temple of Stowe, 3rd Marquess of Buckingham, 4th Earl Nugent, 6th Viscount Cobham and Baron Cobham
Richard Plantagenet Campbell Temple-Nugent-Brydges-Chandos-Grenville; 1823–1889; 3rd Duke of Buckingham and Chandos, Marquess of Chandos, and Earl Temple of Stowe, 4th Marquess of Buckingham, 5th Earl Nugent, 6th Earl Temple, 7th Viscount Cobham and Baron Cobham	Anna Eliza Mary (Temple-Nugent-Brydges-Chandos-Grenville) Gore-Langton; 1820–1879	William Henry Powell Gore-Langton; 1824–1873	George William Lyttelton; 1817–1876; 4th Baron Lyttelton
Dukedom of Buckingham and Chandos, Marquessates of Buckingham and Chandos, and the Earldoms of Temple (1st creation) and of Nugent extinct, 1889
William Stephen Temple-Gore-Langton; 1847–1902; 4th Earl Temple of Stowe	Charles George Lyttelton; 1842–1922; 8th Viscount Cobham and Baron Cobham
Algernon William Stephen Temple-Gore-Langton; 1871–1940; 5th Earl Temple of Stowe	Chandos Graham Temple-Gore-Langton; 1873–1921	Evelyn Arthur Grenville Temple-Gore-Langton; 1884–1972	John Cavendish Lyttelton; 1881–1949; 9th Viscount Cobham and Baron Cobham
Chandos Grenville Temple-Gore-Langton; 1909–1966; 6th Earl Temple of Stowe	Ronald Stephen Brydges Temple-Gore-Langton; 1910–1988; 7th Earl Temple of Stowe	Walter Grenville Algernon Temple-Gore-Langton; 1924–2013; 8th Earl Temple of Stowe	Charles John Lyttelton; 1909–1977; 10th Viscount Cobham and Baron Cobham
James Grenville Temple-Gore-Langton b. 1955; 9th Earl Temple of Stowe	John William Leonard Lyttelton; 1943–2006; 11th Viscount Cobham and Baron Cobham	Christopher Charles Lyttelton b. 1947; 12th Viscount Cobham and Baron Cobham
Rowan Caradoc Temple-Gore-Langton b. 1987	Oliver Christopher Lyttelton b. 1976
Heir apparent to the Earl Temple of Stowe	Heir apparent to the Viscount Cobham

== Arms ==
Coat of arms of Viscount Palmerston
Crest A talbot sejant sable, collared and lined or. Escutcheon Quarterly 1st & 4th, Or, an eagle displayed sable (for Leofric, Earl of Mercia); 2nd & 3rd Argent, two bars sable, each charged with three martlets or (Temple). Supporters Dexter, a lion regardant pean; Sinister, a horse regardant argent, maned, tailed and hoofed or. Motto Flecti non frangi (To be bent, not broken).

== See also ==
- Viscount Cobham
- Duke of Buckingham and Chandos
- Earl Temple of Stowe
- Baron Mount Temple
