= Baron Lyttelton =

Title in the peerage of Great Britain

Arms of Lyttelton: Argent, a chevron between three escallops sable

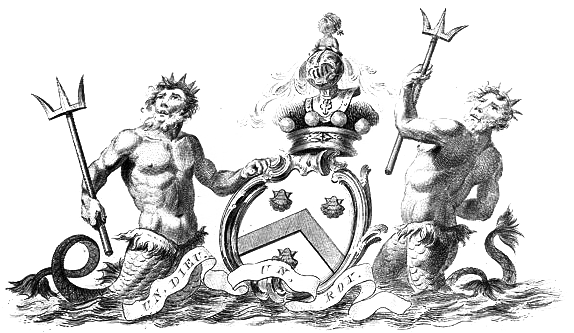
Arms of Lyttelton with supporters and crest

Baron Lyttelton is a title that has been created once in Peerage of England and twice in Peerage of Great Britain, both times for members of the Lyttelton family. Since 1889 the title has been a subsidiary title of the viscountcy of Cobham.

== Barons Lyttelton (1641) ==
Baron Lyttelton, of Mounslow in the County of Shropshire, was a title in the Peerage of England. It was created on 18 February 1641 for Edward Littleton, Chief Justice of North Wales. On his death the barony became extinct.

- Edward Littleton, 1st Baron Lyttelton (1589 – 1645)

== History ==
The Lyttelton barons of Frankley belong to the Frankley and Hagley branch of the extended Littleton/Lyttelton family.

In 1618, Thomas Lyttelton (1593–1650), owner of estates in Frankley, Halesowen, Hagley and Upper Arley, was created Baronet of Frankley, in the County of Worcester, in the Baronetage of England. He later represented Worcestershire in the House of Commons. His son, the second Baronet, sat as Member of Parliament for Lichfield. On his death the titles passed to his younger brother, the third Baronet, He represented Bewdley in Parliament. He was succeeded by his son, the fourth Baronet. He was Member of Parliament for Worcester and Camelford. Lyttelton married Christian, daughter of Sir Richard Temple, 3rd Baronet, and sister of Richard Temple, 1st Viscount Cobham, and Hester Grenville, 1st Countess Temple. The viscountcy of Cobham and its junior title the barony of Cobham were created with remainder, failing male issue, to (1) Lord Cobham's eldest sister Hester Grenville (who succeeded as second Viscountess in 1749 and was created Earl Temple in 1750) and the heirs male of her body and (2) to his third sister Christian, with remainder to the heirs male of her body.

Lyttelton was succeeded by his eldest son, the fifth Baronet, who was a prominent politician. In 1755 he was created Baron Lyttelton, of Frankley in the County of Worcester, in the Peerage of Great Britain. He was succeeded by his son, the second Baron. He briefly represented Bewdley in the House of Commons. Lord Lyttelton had no legitimate issue and on his death in 1779 the barony became extinct. However, he was succeeded in the baronetcy by his uncle, the seventh Baronet. He also represented Bewdley in Parliament and served as Governor of South Carolina and of Jamaica. In 1776, three years before he succeeded in the baronetcy, he was created Baron Westcote, of Balamere in the County of Longford, in the Peerage of Ireland. In 1794 he was further created Baron Lyttelton, of Frankley in the County of Worcester, in the Peerage of Great Britain. His eldest son, the second Baron, also sat as Member of Parliament for Bewdley. He was succeeded by his half-brother, the third Baron. He represented Worcestershire in the House of Commons and also served as Lord Lieutenant of Worcestershire. His son, the fourth Baron, was briefly Under-Secretary of State for War and the Colonies in 1846 under Sir Robert Peel and also served as Lord Lieutenant of Worcestershire. On his death, the titles passed to his son, the fifth Baron. In 1889 he succeeded his distant relative Richard Temple-Nugent-Brydges-Chandos-Grenville, 3rd Duke of Buckingham and Chandos, as eighth Baron and Viscount Cobham, according to the aforementioned special remainder in the letters patent.

Since 1889 the holders of the Lyttelton titles of 1618 and 1794 have chosen to use the style of Viscount Cobham (see there for further history).

== Lyttelton baronets, of Frankley (1618) ==
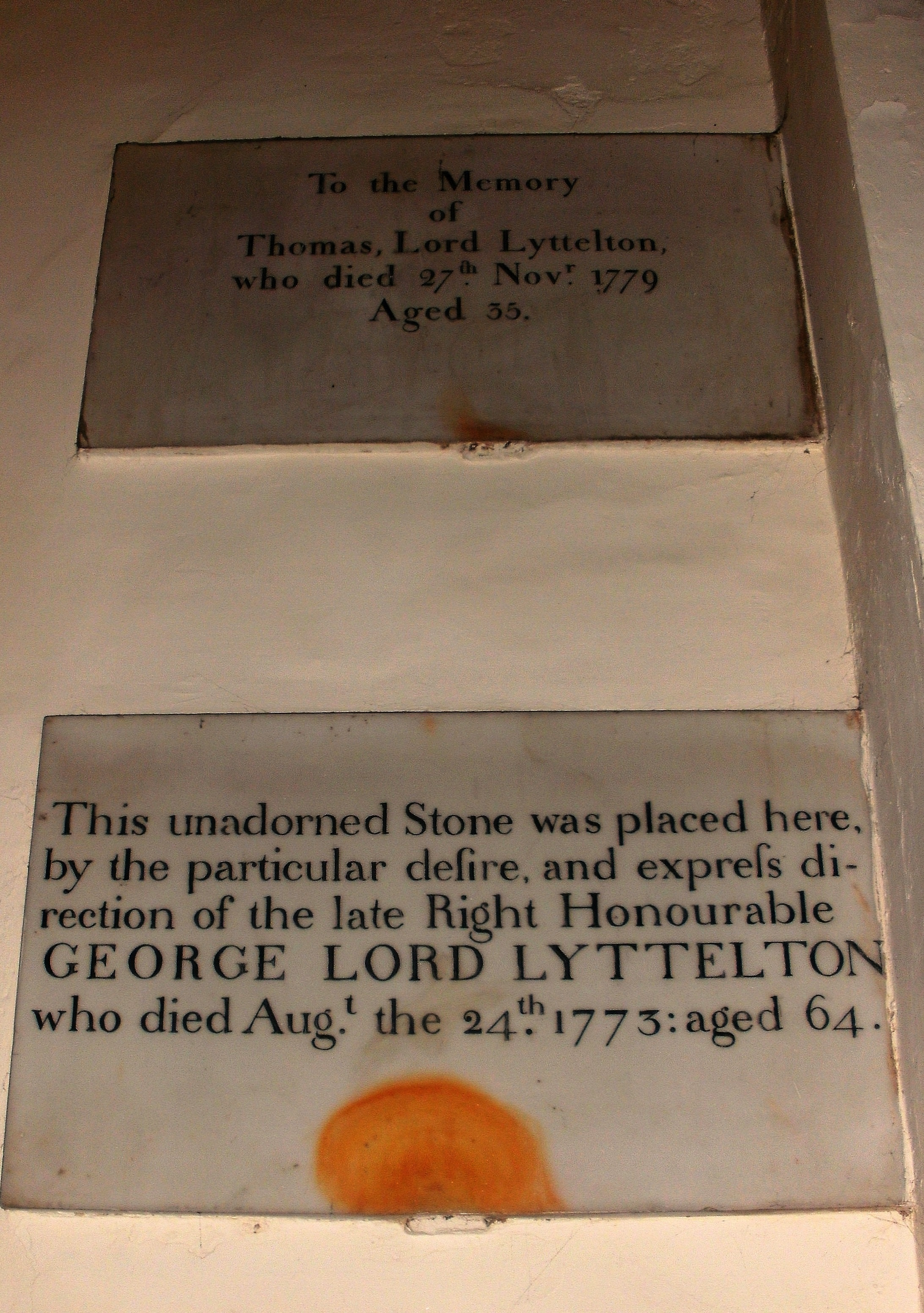
St John the Baptist Church, Hagley, memorials to two barons Lyttelton of the 1756 creation

- Sir Thomas Lyttelton, 1st Baronet (1593–1650)
- Sir Henry Lyttelton, 2nd Baronet (1624–1693)
- Sir Charles Lyttelton, 3rd Baronet (1628–1716)
- Sir Thomas Lyttelton, 4th Baronet (1686–1751)
- Sir George Lyttelton, 5th Baronet (1709–1773) (created Baron Lyttelton in 1756)

== Barons Lyttelton, First creation (1756) ==
- George Lyttelton, 1st Baron Lyttelton (1709–1773)
- Thomas Lyttelton, 2nd Baron Lyttelton (1744–1779)

== Lyttelton baronets, of Frankley (1618; Reverted) and Barons Westcote (1776) ==
- Sir William Henry Lyttelton, 7th Baronet (1724–1808) (created Baron Westcote in 1776 and Baron Lyttelton in 1794)

== Barons Lyttelton, Second Creation (1794) ==
- William Henry Lyttelton, 1st Baron Lyttelton (1724–1808)
- George Fulke Lyttelton, 2nd Baron Lyttelton (1763–1828)
- William Henry Lyttelton, 3rd Baron Lyttelton (1782–1837)
- George William Lyttelton, 4th Baron Lyttelton (1817–1876)
- Charles George Lyttelton, 5th Baron Lyttelton (1842–1922) (succeeded as Viscount Cobham in 1889)

For further succession see Viscount Cobham.

=== Family tree ===
Family tree of the Duke of Buckingham and Chandos, Marquess of Buckingham, Marquess of Chandos, Viscount Cobham, Earl Temple, Earl Temple of Stowe, Baron Cobham, Baron Grenville, Baron Lyttelton, Baron Westcote and Temple baronets

Peter Temple
Anthony Temple	John Temple
Baronet, of Stowe, in the County of Buckingham, 1611
William Temple; 1555–1627	Thomas Temple; 1567–1637; 1st Baronet, of Stowe	Alexander Temple; 1583–1629
Baronet, of Frankley, in the County of Worcester, 1618
John Temple; 1600–1677	Peter Temple; 1592–1653; 2nd Baronet, of Stowe	John Temple; 1593–1632	James Temple; 1606–1680	Thomas Lyttelton; 1593–1650; 1st Baronet, of Frankley
Baronet, of Stowe, in the County of Buckingham, 1662
Thomas Temple; 1613/14–1674; 1st Baronet, of Stowe	Peter Temple; 1613–1660	Henry Lyttelton; 1624–1693; 2nd Baronet, of Frankley	Charles Lyttelton; 1628–1716; 3rd Baronet, of Frankley
Baronetcy of Stowe (1662 creation) extinct, 1674
John Temple; 1632–1705	Richard Temple; 1634–1697; 3rd Baronet, of Stowe	Eleanor Temple d. 1729 m. Richard Grenville	William Temple d. 1706
Viscount Palmerston and Baron Temple, of Mount Temple in the County of Sligo, 1723	Baron Cobham, of Cobham in the County of Kent (6th creation), 1714; Viscount Cobham and Baron Cobham, of Cobham in the County of Kent (7th creation), 1718	Earl Temple, 1749
Henry Temple c. 1673–1757; 1st Viscount Palmerston and Baron Temple	Richard Temple; 1675–1749; 1st Viscount Cobham and Baron Cobham, 4th Baronet, of Stowe	Hester Grenville c. 1690–1752; 1st Countess Temple, 2nd Viscountess Cobham and 2nd Baroness Cobham	Richard Grenville; 1678–1727	Christian Temple	Thomas Lyttelton; 1686–1751; 4th Baronet, of Frankley	William Temple; 1694–1760; 5th Baronet, of Stowe	Peter Temple d. 1761; 6th Baronet, of Stowe
Barony of Cobham (1714 creation) extinct, 1749
Henry, Lord Temple	Richard Temple; 1731–1786; 7th Baronet, of Stowe
Baron Lyttelton (1st creation), 1756	Baron Westcote, 1776; Baron Lyttelton (2nd creation), 1794	Baronetcy of Stowe dormant, 1786
Henry Temple; 1739–1802; 2nd Viscount Palmerston and Baron Temple	Richard Grenville-Temple; 1711–1779; 2nd Earl Temple, 3rd Viscount Cobham and Baron Cobham	George Grenville; 1712–1770	Hester Grenville; 1720–1803; Baroness Chatham m. William Pitt the Elder, Earl of Chatham and Viscount Pitt	George Lyttelton; 1709–1773; 1st Baron Lyttelton, 5th Baronet, of Frankley	William Henry Lyttelton; 1724–1808; 1st Baron Lyttelton
Marquess of Buckingham, 1784	Baron Grenville, of Wotton under Bernewood in the County of Buckingham, 1790
George Nugent-Temple-Grenville; 1753–1813; 1st Marquess of Buckingham, 3rd Earl Temple, 2nd Earl Nugent, 4th Viscount Cobham and Baron Cobham	William Wyndham Grenville; 1759–1834; 1st Baron Grenville	William Pitt the Younger; 1759–1806	Thomas Lyttelton; 1744–1779; 2nd Baron Lyttelton, 5th Baronet, of Frankley
Barony of Grenville extinct, 1834	Barony of Lyttelton and Baronetcy of Frankley extinct, 1779
Duke of Buckingham and Chandos, Marquess of Chandos and Earl Temple of Stowe, 1822
Henry John Temple; 1784–1865; 3rd Viscount Palmerston and Baron Temple	Richard Temple-Nugent-Brydges-Chandos-Grenville; 1776–1839; 1st Duke of Buckingham and Chandos, Marquess of Chandos, and Earl Temple of Stowe, 2nd Marquess of Buckingham, 3rd Earl Nugent, 4th Earl Temple, 5th Viscount Cobham and Baron Cobham	George Fulke Lyttelton; 1763–1828; 2nd Baron Lyttelton	William Henry Lyttelton; 1782–1837; 3rd Baron Lyttelton
Richard Plantagenet Temple-Nugent-Brydges-Chandos-Grenville; 1797–1861; 2nd Duke of Buckingham and Chandos, Marquess of Chandos, and Earl Temple of Stowe, 3rd Marquess of Buckingham, 4th Earl Nugent, 6th Viscount Cobham and Baron Cobham
Richard Plantagenet Campbell Temple-Nugent-Brydges-Chandos-Grenville; 1823–1889; 3rd Duke of Buckingham and Chandos, Marquess of Chandos, and Earl Temple of Stowe, 4th Marquess of Buckingham, 5th Earl Nugent, 6th Earl Temple, 7th Viscount Cobham and Baron Cobham	Anna Eliza Mary (Temple-Nugent-Brydges-Chandos-Grenville) Gore-Langton; 1820–1879	William Henry Powell Gore-Langton; 1824–1873	George William Lyttelton; 1817–1876; 4th Baron Lyttelton
Dukedom of Buckingham and Chandos, Marquessates of Buckingham and Chandos, and the Earldoms of Temple (1st creation) and of Nugent extinct, 1889
William Stephen Temple-Gore-Langton; 1847–1902; 4th Earl Temple of Stowe	Charles George Lyttelton; 1842–1922; 8th Viscount Cobham and Baron Cobham
Algernon William Stephen Temple-Gore-Langton; 1871–1902; 5th Earl Temple of Stowe	Chandos Graham Temple-Gore-Langton; 1873–1921	Evelyn Arthur Grenville Temple-Gore-Langton; 1884–1972	John Cavendish Lyttelton; 1881–1949; 9th Viscount Cobham and Baron Cobham
Chandos Grenville Temple-Gore-Langton; 1909–1966; 6th Earl Temple of Stowe	Ronald Stephen Brydges Temple-Gore-Langton; 1910–1988; 7th Earl Temple of Stowe	Walter Grenville Algernon Temple-Gore-Langton; 1924–2013; 8th Earl Temple of Stowe	Charles John Lyttelton; 1909–1977; 10th Viscount Cobham and Baron Cobham
James Grenville Temple-Gore-Langton b. 1955; 9th Earl Temple of Stowe	John William Leonard Lyttelton; 1943–2006; 11th Viscount Cobham and Baron Cobham	Christopher Charles Lyttelton b. 1947; 12th Viscount Cobham and Baron Cobham
Rowan Caradoc Temple-Gore-Langton b. 1987	Oliver Christopher Lyttelton b. 1976
Heir apparent to the Earl Temple of Stowe	Heir apparent to the Viscount Cobham

== See also ==
- Lyttelton family
- Viscount Chandos
