= Earl Temple =

Earldom in the Peerage of Great Britain

The Baronetcy of Temple, of Stowe, in the Baronetage of England, was created on the 24th of September 1611 for Thomas Temple, eldest son of John Temple of Stowe, Buckinghamshire. His great-grandson Sir Richard, 4th Baronet, was created Baron Cobham on 19 October 1714, and Viscount Cobham and Baron Cobham on 23 May 1718, the latter with a special remainder, failing his male issue (of which he had none) to his sisters and their heirs male. Upon his death on the 13th September 1749, the barony of 1714 became extinct. Both the viscountcy and barony of 1718 passed to his elder sister, and the baronetcy passed to his second cousin once removed William Temple, of Nash House, who became 5th Baronet. On the death of Sir William's nephew Sir Richard Temple, 7th Baronet, on 15 November 1786, the baronetcy became dormant.

The Earldom of Temple was created in the Peerage of Great Britain on 18 October 1749 for Hester, 2nd Viscountess Cobham, a sister of Richard Temple, 1st Viscount Cobham. She had been married in 1710 to Richard Grenville, of Wotton, Buckinghamshire, and at her death on 6 October 1752, she was succeeded by her eldest son Richard, who became 2nd Earl Temple. His nephew George, 3rd Earl Temple (son of his younger brother George Grenville, who served as Prime Minister), was created Marquess of Buckingham on 4 December 1784. His son Richard, 2nd Marquess of Buckingham and 4th Earl Temple, was created Duke of Buckingham and Chandos and Earl Temple of Stowe in the Peerage of the United Kingdom on 4 February 1822, the latter title with a special remainder to allow female descendants to succeed. On the death of the 3rd Duke of Buckingham and Chandos on 26 March 1889, the Dukedom and Marquessate became extinct, as did the Earldom of 1749. The Earldom of 1822 passed to his nephew William Gore-Langton, son of his sister Lady Anna, and the Viscountcy of Cobham to his fourth cousin once removed, the 5th Lord Lyttelton and Westcote, a great-great-grandson of the younger sister of the 1st Viscount. Both these titles remain extant.

== Baronets, of Stowe (1611) ==
- Sir Thomas Temple, 1st Baronet (1567–1637)
- Sir Peter Temple, 2nd Baronet (1592–1653)
- Sir Richard Temple, 3rd Baronet (1634–1697)
- Sir Richard Temple, 4th Baronet (1669–1749), created Viscount Cobham in 1718
- Sir William Temple, 5th Baronet (1694–1760)
- Sir Peter Temple, 6th Baronet (d. 1761)
- Sir Richard Temple, 7th Baronet (1731–1786); at his death, the title became dormant

== Earls Temple (1749) ==
- Hester Temple, 1st Countess Temple (1690–1752), also 2nd Viscountess Cobham
- Richard Grenville-Temple, 2nd Earl Temple (1711–1779)
- George Nugent-Temple-Grenville, 3rd Earl Temple (1753–1813), created Marquess of Buckingham in 1784
- Richard Temple-Nugent-Brydges-Chandos-Grenville, 4th Earl Temple, 2nd Marquess of Buckingham (1776–1839), created Duke of Buckingham and Chandos in 1822
- Richard Plantagenet Temple-Nugent-Brydges-Chandos-Grenville, 5th Earl Temple, 2nd Duke of Buckingham and Chandos (1797–1861)
- Richard Plantagenet Campbell Temple-Nugent-Brydges-Chandos-Grenville, 6th Earl Temple, 3rd Duke of Buckingham and Chandos (1823–1889)

== Earls Temple of Stowe (1822) ==
- Richard Temple-Nugent-Brydges-Chandos-Grenville, 1st Earl Temple of Stowe, 1st Duke of Buckingham and Chandos (1776–1839)
- Richard Plantagenet Temple-Nugent-Brydges-Chandos-Grenville, 2nd Earl Temple of Stowe, 2nd Duke of Buckingham and Chandos (1797–1861)
- Richard Plantagenet Campbell Temple-Nugent-Brydges-Chandos-Grenville, 3rd Earl Temple of Stowe, 3rd Duke of Buckingham and Chandos (1823–1889)
- William Temple-Gore-Langton, 4th Earl Temple of Stowe (1847–1902)
- for further Earls, see Earl Temple of Stowe

== Family tree ==
Family tree of the Duke of Buckingham and Chandos, Marquess of Buckingham, Marquess of Chandos, Viscount Cobham, Earl Temple, Earl Temple of Stowe, Baron Cobham, Baron Grenville, Baron Lyttelton, Baron Westcote and Temple baronets

Peter Temple
Anthony Temple	John Temple
Baronet, of Stowe, in the County of Buckingham, 1611
William Temple; 1555–1627	Thomas Temple; 1567–1637; 1st Baronet, of Stowe	Alexander Temple; 1583–1629
Baronet, of Frankley, in the County of Worcester, 1618
John Temple; 1600–1677	Peter Temple; 1592–1653; 2nd Baronet, of Stowe	John Temple; 1593–1632	James Temple; 1606–1680	Thomas Lyttelton; 1593–1650; 1st Baronet, of Frankley
Baronet, of Stowe, in the County of Buckingham, 1662
Thomas Temple; 1613/14–1674; 1st Baronet, of Stowe	Peter Temple; 1613–1660	Henry Lyttelton; 1624–1693; 2nd Baronet, of Frankley	Charles Lyttelton; 1628–1716; 3rd Baronet, of Frankley
Baronetcy of Stowe (1662 creation) extinct, 1674
John Temple; 1632–1705	Richard Temple; 1634–1697; 3rd Baronet, of Stowe	Eleanor Temple d. 1729 m. Richard Grenville	William Temple d. 1706
Viscount Palmerston and Baron Temple, of Mount Temple in the County of Sligo, 1723	Baron Cobham, of Cobham in the County of Kent (6th creation), 1714; Viscount Cobham and Baron Cobham, of Cobham in the County of Kent (7th creation), 1718	Earl Temple, 1749
Henry Temple c. 1673–1757; 1st Viscount Palmerston and Baron Temple	Richard Temple; 1675–1749; 1st Viscount Cobham, etc., 4th Baronet, of Stowe	Hester Grenville c. 1690–1752; 1st Countess Temple, 2nd Viscountess Cobham and 2nd Baroness Cobham	Richard Grenville; 1678–1727	Christian Temple	Thomas Lyttelton; 1686–1751; 4th Baronet, of Frankley	William Temple; 1694–1760; 5th Baronet, of Stowe	Peter Temple d. 1761; 6th Baronet, of Stowe
Barony of Cobham (1714 creation) extinct, 1749
Henry, Lord Temple	Richard Temple; 1731–1786; 7th Baronet, of Stowe
Baron Lyttelton (1st creation), 1756	Baron Westcote, 1776; Baron Lyttelton (2nd creation), 1794	Baronetcy of Stowe dormant, 1786
Henry Temple; 1739–1802; 2nd Viscount Palmerston and Baron Temple	Richard Grenville-Temple; 1711–1779; 2nd Earl Temple, 3rd Viscount Cobham, etc.	George Grenville; 1712–1770	Hester Grenville; 1720–1803; Baroness Chatham m. William Pitt the Elder, Earl of Chatham and Viscount Pitt	George Lyttelton; 1709–1773; 1st Baron Lyttelton, 5th Baronet, of Frankley	William Henry Lyttelton; 1724–1808; 1st Baron Lyttelton
Marquess of Buckingham (2nd creation), 1784	Baron Grenville, of Wotton under Bernewood in the County of Buckingham, 1790
George Nugent-Temple-Grenville; 1753–1813; 1st Marquess of Buckingham, 3rd Earl Temple, 2nd Earl Nugent, 4th Viscount Cobham, etc.	William Wyndham Grenville; 1759–1834; 1st Baron Grenville	William Pitt the Younger; 1759–1806	Thomas Lyttelton; 1744–1779; 2nd Baron Lyttelton, 5th Baronet, of Frankley
Barony of Grenville extinct, 1834	Barony of Lyttelton and Baronetcy of Frankley extinct, 1779
Duke of Buckingham and Chandos, Marquess of Chandos and Earl Temple of Stowe, 1822
Henry John Temple; 1784–1865; 3rd Viscount Palmerston and Baron Temple	Richard Temple-Nugent-Brydges-Chandos-Grenville; 1776–1839; 1st Duke of Buckingham and Chandos, Marquess of Chandos, and Earl Temple of Stowe, 2nd Marquess of Buckingham, 3rd Earl Nugent, 4th Earl Temple, 5th Viscount Cobham, etc.	George Fulke Lyttelton; 1763–1828; 2nd Baron Lyttelton	William Henry Lyttelton; 1782–1837; 3rd Baron Lyttelton
Richard Plantagenet Temple-Nugent-Brydges-Chandos-Grenville; 1797–1861; 2nd Duke of Buckingham and Chandos, Marquess of Chandos, and Earl Temple of Stowe, 3rd Marquess of Buckingham, 4th Earl Nugent, 6th Viscount Cobham, etc.
Richard Plantagenet Campbell Temple-Nugent-Brydges-Chandos-Grenville; 1823–1889; 3rd Duke of Buckingham and Chandos, Marquess of Chandos, and Earl Temple of Stowe, 4th Marquess of Buckingham, 5th Earl Nugent, 6th Earl Temple, 7th Viscount Cobham, etc.	Anna Eliza Mary (Temple-Nugent-Brydges-Chandos-Grenville) Gore-Langton; 1820–1879	William Henry Powell Gore-Langton; 1824–1873	George William Lyttelton; 1817–1876; 4th Baron Lyttelton
Dukedom of Buckingham and Chandos, Marquessates of Buckingham and Chandos, and the Earldoms of Temple (1st creation) and of Nugent extinct, 1889
William Stephen Temple-Gore-Langton; 1847–1902; 4th Earl Temple of Stowe	Charles George Lyttelton; 1842–1922; 8th Viscount Cobham, etc.
Algernon William Stephen Temple-Gore-Langton; 1871–1940; 5th Earl Temple of Stowe	Chandos Graham Temple-Gore-Langton; 1873–1921	Evelyn Arthur Grenville Temple-Gore-Langton; 1884–1972	John Cavendish Lyttelton; 1881–1949; 9th Viscount Cobham, etc.
Chandos Grenville Temple-Gore-Langton; 1909–1966; 6th Earl Temple of Stowe	Ronald Stephen Brydges Temple-Gore-Langton; 1910–1988; 7th Earl Temple of Stowe	Walter Grenville Algernon Temple-Gore-Langton; 1924–2013; 8th Earl Temple of Stowe	Charles John Lyttelton; 1909–1977; 10th Viscount Cobham, etc.
James Grenville Temple-Gore-Langton b. 1955; 9th Earl Temple of Stowe	John William Leonard Lyttelton; 1943–2006; 11th Viscount Cobham, etc.	Christopher Charles Lyttelton b. 1947; 12th Viscount Cobham, etc.
Rowan Caradoc Temple-Gore-Langton b. 1987	Oliver Christopher Lyttelton b. 1976
Heir apparent to the Earl Temple of Stowe	Heir apparent to the Viscount Cobham
