= Earl Temple of Stowe =

Earldom in the Peerage of the United Kingdom

Earldom of Temple of Stowe
- Blazon Arms of Temple-Gore-Langton, Earl Temple of Stowe; Quarterly: 1st & 4th grand quarters: Quarterly sable and or a bend argent(Langton); 2nd grand quarter; Gules, a fesse between three cross-crosslets fitchée or (Gore); 3rd grand quarter: quarterly 1st & 4th: Or, an eagle displayed sable(Temple); 2nd & 3rd: Argent, two bars sable each charged with three martlets or (Temple). Crests: Centre: an Eagle Or, and a Wyvern Vert, their necks entwined reguardant (Langton). Dexter: on a mount Vert, an Heraldic Tiger salient Argent, collared Gules (Gore). Sinister: on a Ducal Coronet a Martlet Or (Temple). Supporters: Dexter: a Lion rampant per fess nebuly Or and Gules, suspended from a Ribbon round the neck Gules, a Shield of the Arms of Langton. Sinister: a Horse Argent, semée of Eagles displayed Sable, suspended from a Ribbon round the neck a Shield of the Arms of Gore.
- Creation date: 17 September 1822
- Created by: King George IV
- Peerage: Peerage of the United Kingdom
- First holder: Richard Temple-Nugent-Brydges-Chandos-Grenville, 1st Duke of Buckingham and Chandos
- Present holder: James Temple-Gore-Langton, 9th Earl Temple of Stowe
- Heir presumptive: The Hon. Robert Temple-Gore-Langton
- Remainder to: Special remainder - see main text
- Status: Extant
- Former seat: Stowe House
- Motto: 1st: TEMPLA QUAM DILECTA (How delightful are temples) (Temple); 2nd: FRANGAS NON FLECTES (You may break but you will not bend me) (Gore); 3rd: IN HOC SIGNO VINCES (In this sign thou shalt conquer) (Langton)

Earl Temple of Stowe, in the County of Buckingham, is a title in the Peerage of the United Kingdom. It was created in 1822 for Richard Temple-Nugent-Brydges-Chandos-Grenville, 2nd Marquess of Buckingham, who was created Marquess of Chandos and Duke of Buckingham and Chandos at the same time. In contrast to the Marquessate and Dukedom, which were created with remainder to the heirs male of his body only, the Earldom was created with remainder to (1) the heirs male of his body, failing which to (2) the heirs male of his deceased great-grandmother the 1st Countess Temple, failing which to (3) his granddaughter Lady Anna Grenville (daughter of Richard, Earl Temple, later 2nd Duke of Buckingham and Chandos) and the heirs male of her body, and then to possible younger daughters of Lord Temple and the heirs male of their bodies (there were, in the event, no other daughters).

The Earldom remained merged with the Dukedom until the death of the 1st Duke's grandson the 3rd Duke, when the Dukedom and four of its subsidiary titles became extinct (the Viscountcy and Barony of Cobham and the Lordship of Kinloss survived, however; see these titles for more information). The late Duke was succeeded in the Earldom of Temple of Stowe according to the special remainder by his nephew William Gore-Langton. He was the eldest son of the aforementioned Lady Anna Grenville and her husband William Gore-Langton. The latter was a descendant of Sir John Gore, Lord Mayor of London in 1624, whose elder brother Sir Paul Gore, 1st Baronet, was the ancestor of the Earls of Arran (1762 creation), the Barons Annaly (1766 and 1789 creations) and the Barons Harlech.

The 4th Earl Temple of Stowe had previously represented Mid Somerset in Parliament as a Conservative. In 1892 he assumed by Royal licence the additional surname of Temple. He was succeeded by his eldest son, the 5th Earl. He died childless and was succeeded by his nephew, the 6th Earl. He was the eldest son of Captain the Hon. Chandos Temple-Gore-Langton, second son of the 4th Earl. Chandos had two daughters. On his death the title passed to his younger brother, the 7th Earl. He was a travelling salesman in Australia and did not use the title. He never married and was succeeded by his cousin, the 8th Earl. He was the son of the Hon. Evelyn Arthur Grenville Temple-Gore-Langton, third and youngest son of the fourth Earl. Upon his death in 2013, he was succeeded by his son James. Lord Temple of Stowe is also in remainder to the Lordship of Kinloss.

There are no subsidiary titles held by the Earl. Consequently, the eldest son and heir of the Earl uses the invented title Lord Langton as a courtesy title.

The family seat from which the title derives was Stowe House in Buckinghamshire.

== Earls Temple of Stowe (1822) ==
- Richard Temple-Nugent-Brydges-Chandos-Grenville, 1st Duke of Buckingham and Chandos, 1st Earl Temple of Stowe (1776–1839)
- Richard Plantagenet Temple-Nugent-Brydges-Chandos-Grenville, 2nd Duke of Buckingham and Chandos, 2nd Earl Temple of Stowe (1797–1861)
- Richard Plantagenet Campbell Temple-Nugent-Brydges-Chandos-Grenville, 3rd Duke of Buckingham and Chandos, 3rd Earl Temple of Stowe (1823–1889)
- William Stephen Temple-Gore-Langton, 4th Earl Temple of Stowe (1847–1902)
- Algernon William Stephen Temple-Gore-Langton, 5th Earl Temple of Stowe (1871–1940)
- Chandos Grenville Temple-Gore-Langton, 6th Earl Temple of Stowe (1909–1966)
- (Ronald) Stephen Brydges Temple-Gore-Langton, 7th Earl Temple of Stowe (1910–1988)
- (Walter) Grenville Algernon Temple-Gore-Langton, 8th Earl Temple of Stowe (1924–2013)
- James Grenville Temple-Gore-Langton, 9th Earl Temple of Stowe (born 1955)

== Family tree ==
Family tree of the Duke of Buckingham and Chandos, Marquess of Buckingham, Marquess of Chandos, Viscount Cobham, Earl Temple, Earl Temple of Stowe, Baron Cobham, Baron Grenville, Baron Lyttelton, Baron Westcote and Temple baronets

Peter Temple
Anthony Temple	John Temple
Baronet, of Stowe, in the County of Buckingham, 1611
William Temple; 1555–1627	Thomas Temple; 1567–1637; 1st Baronet, of Stowe	Alexander Temple; 1583–1629
Baronet, of Frankley, in the County of Worcester, 1618
John Temple; 1600–1677	Peter Temple; 1592–1653; 2nd Baronet, of Stowe	John Temple; 1593–1632	James Temple; 1606–1680	Thomas Lyttelton; 1593–1650; 1st Baronet, of Frankley
Baronet, of Stowe, in the County of Buckingham, 1662
Thomas Temple; 1613/14–1674; 1st Baronet, of Stowe	Peter Temple; 1613–1660	Henry Lyttelton; 1624–1693; 2nd Baronet, of Frankley	Charles Lyttelton; 1628–1716; 3rd Baronet, of Frankley
Baronetcy of Stowe (1662 creation) extinct, 1674
John Temple; 1632–1705	Richard Temple; 1634–1697; 3rd Baronet, of Stowe	Eleanor Temple d. 1729 m. Richard Grenville	William Temple d. 1706
Viscount Palmerston and Baron Temple, of Mount Temple in the County of Sligo, 1723	Baron Cobham, of Cobham in the County of Kent (6th creation), 1714; Viscount Cobham and Baron Cobham, of Cobham in the County of Kent (7th creation), 1718	Earl Temple, 1749
Henry Temple c. 1673–1757; 1st Viscount Palmerston and Baron Temple	Richard Temple; 1675–1749; 1st Viscount Cobham, etc., 4th Baronet, of Stowe	Hester Grenville c. 1690–1752; 1st Countess Temple, 2nd Viscountess Cobham and 2nd Baroness Cobham	Richard Grenville; 1678–1727	Christian Temple	Thomas Lyttelton; 1686–1751; 4th Baronet, of Frankley	William Temple; 1694–1760; 5th Baronet, of Stowe	Peter Temple d. 1761; 6th Baronet, of Stowe
Barony of Cobham (1714 creation) extinct, 1749
Henry, Lord Temple	Richard Temple; 1731–1786; 7th Baronet, of Stowe
Baron Lyttelton (1st creation), 1756	Baron Westcote, 1776; Baron Lyttelton (2nd creation), 1794	Baronetcy of Stowe dormant, 1786
Henry Temple; 1739–1802; 2nd Viscount Palmerston and Baron Temple	Richard Grenville-Temple; 1711–1779; 2nd Earl Temple, 3rd Viscount Cobham, etc.	George Grenville; 1712–1770	Hester Grenville; 1720–1803; Baroness Chatham m. William Pitt the Elder, Earl of Chatham and Viscount Pitt	George Lyttelton; 1709–1773; 1st Baron Lyttelton, 5th Baronet, of Frankley	William Henry Lyttelton; 1724–1808; 1st Baron Lyttelton
Marquess of Buckingham (2nd creation), 1784	Baron Grenville, of Wotton under Bernewood in the County of Buckingham, 1790
George Nugent-Temple-Grenville; 1753–1813; 1st Marquess of Buckingham, 3rd Earl Temple, 2nd Earl Nugent, 4th Viscount Cobham, etc.	William Wyndham Grenville; 1759–1834; 1st Baron Grenville	William Pitt the Younger; 1759–1806	Thomas Lyttelton; 1744–1779; 2nd Baron Lyttelton, 5th Baronet, of Frankley
Barony of Grenville extinct, 1834	Barony of Lyttelton and Baronetcy of Frankley extinct, 1779
Duke of Buckingham and Chandos, Marquess of Chandos and Earl Temple of Stowe, 1822
Henry John Temple; 1784–1865; 3rd Viscount Palmerston and Baron Temple	Richard Temple-Nugent-Brydges-Chandos-Grenville; 1776–1839; 1st Duke of Buckingham and Chandos, Marquess of Chandos, and Earl Temple of Stowe, 2nd Marquess of Buckingham, 3rd Earl Nugent, 4th Earl Temple, 5th Viscount Cobham, etc.	George Fulke Lyttelton; 1763–1828; 2nd Baron Lyttelton	William Henry Lyttelton; 1782–1837; 3rd Baron Lyttelton
Richard Plantagenet Temple-Nugent-Brydges-Chandos-Grenville; 1797–1861; 2nd Duke of Buckingham and Chandos, Marquess of Chandos, and Earl Temple of Stowe, 3rd Marquess of Buckingham, 4th Earl Nugent, 6th Viscount Cobham, etc.
Richard Plantagenet Campbell Temple-Nugent-Brydges-Chandos-Grenville; 1823–1889; 3rd Duke of Buckingham and Chandos, Marquess of Chandos, and Earl Temple of Stowe, 4th Marquess of Buckingham, 5th Earl Nugent, 6th Earl Temple, 7th Viscount Cobham, etc.	Anna Eliza Mary (Temple-Nugent-Brydges-Chandos-Grenville) Gore-Langton; 1820–1879	William Henry Powell Gore-Langton; 1824–1873	George William Lyttelton; 1817–1876; 4th Baron Lyttelton
Dukedom of Buckingham and Chandos, Marquessates of Buckingham and Chandos, and the Earldoms of Temple (1st creation) and of Nugent extinct, 1889
William Stephen Temple-Gore-Langton; 1847–1902; 4th Earl Temple of Stowe	Charles George Lyttelton; 1842–1922; 8th Viscount Cobham, etc.
Algernon William Stephen Temple-Gore-Langton; 1871–1940; 5th Earl Temple of Stowe	Chandos Graham Temple-Gore-Langton; 1873–1921	Evelyn Arthur Grenville Temple-Gore-Langton; 1884–1972	John Cavendish Lyttelton; 1881–1949; 9th Viscount Cobham, etc.
Chandos Grenville Temple-Gore-Langton; 1909–1966; 6th Earl Temple of Stowe	Ronald Stephen Brydges Temple-Gore-Langton; 1910–1988; 7th Earl Temple of Stowe	Walter Grenville Algernon Temple-Gore-Langton; 1924–2013; 8th Earl Temple of Stowe	Charles John Lyttelton; 1909–1977; 10th Viscount Cobham, etc.
James Grenville Temple-Gore-Langton b. 1955; 9th Earl Temple of Stowe	John William Leonard Lyttelton; 1943–2006; 11th Viscount Cobham, etc.	Christopher Charles Lyttelton b. 1947; 12th Viscount Cobham, etc.
Rowan Caradoc Temple-Gore-Langton b. 1987	Oliver Christopher Lyttelton b. 1976
Heir apparent to the Earl Temple of Stowe	Heir apparent to the Viscount Cobham

== Present peer ==
James Grenville Temple-Gore-Langton, 9th Earl Temple of Stowe (born 1955) is the elder son of the 8th Earl. In 2008 he married Julie Christine Mainwaring, daughter of Alan Mainwaring, of Brampton, Cumbria, and they have two children:

- Rowan Caradoc Temple (born 1987), not in succession to the peerages
- Lady Jenny Megan Temple (born 1990)

The heir presumptive is the present holder's brother, the Hon. Robert Chandos Grenville Temple-Gore-Langton (born 1957), whose heir apparent is his son, Louis Grenville Gore-Langton (born 1990).

== Line of succession ==
- Richard Temple-Nugent-Brydges-Chandos-Grenville, 1st Duke of Buckingham and Chandos, 1st Earl Temple of Stowe (1776–1839)
  - Richard Plantagenet Temple-Nugent-Brudges-Chandos-Grenville, 2nd Duke of Buckingham and Chandos, 2nd Earl Temple of Stowe (1797–1861)
    - Richard Plantagenet Campbell Temple-Nugent-Brydges-Chandos-Grenville, 3rd Duke of Buckingham and Chandos, 3rd Earl Temple of Stowe (1823–1889)
    - Lady Anna Eliza Mary Temple-Nugent-Brydges-Chandos-Grenville (d. 1879)
      - William Stephen Temple-Gore-Langton, 4th Earl Temple of Stowe (1847–1902)
        - Algernon William Stephen Temple-Gore-Langton, 5th Earl Temple of Stowe (1871–1940)
        - Captain Hon. Chandos Graham Temple-Gore-Langton (1873–1921)
          - Chandos Grenville Temple-Gore-Langton, 6th Earl Temple of Stowe (1909–1966)
          - Ronald Stephen Brydges Temple-Gore-Langton, 7th Earl Temple of Stowe (1910–1988)
        - Lt-Cdr Hon. Evelyn Arthur Grenville Temple-Gore-Langton (1884–1972)
          - Walter Grenville Algernon Temple-Gore-Langton, 8th Earl Temple of Stowe (1924–2013)
            - James Grenville Temple-Gore-Langton, 9th Earl Temple of Stowe (born 1955)
              - Rowan Caradoc Temple-Gore-Langton (b. 1987; born before his parents' marriage and therefore not included in the line of succession)
            - (1) Hon. Robert Chandos Temple-Gore-Langton (b. 1957)
              - (2) Louis Grenville Temple-Gore-Langton (b. 1990)
              - (3) Christopher Chandos Temple-Gore-Langton (b. 1993)
      - Hon. Henry Powell Gore-Langton (1854–1913)
        - Commander Hubert Edwin Gore-Langton (1883–1968)
          - Lt-Cdr. Alaric Hubert St. George Gore-Langton (1918–1987)
            - (4) Chandos Alaric Graham Gore Langton (b. 1949)
              - (5) Chandos James Brydges Gore Langton (b. 1987)
            - (6) Grenville Julian Brydges Gore-Langton (b. 1954)
        - Robert Lancelot Gore-Langton (1885–1948)
          - Montagu Grenville Gore-Langton (1919–1968)
            - (7) Dr. Robert Edward Gore-Langton (b. 1950)
              - (8) Jonathan Kent Gore-Langton (b. 1990)
        - Lt-Cdr. Richard Gerald Gore-Langton (1892–1978)
          - (9) Richard Eric Bevan Gore-Langton (b. 1933)
            - (10) Richard Thomas Gore-Langton (b. 1959)
          - (11) Gerald Hugh Gore-Langton (b. 1947)
          - (12) Norman Guy Gore-Langton (b. 1950)

== See also ==
- Duke of Buckingham and Chandos
- Baron Grenville
- Viscount Cobham
- Lady Kinloss
- Earl of Arran (Ireland) (1762 creation)
- Baron Annaly (1766 and 1789 creations)
- Baron Harlech
