= Hester Grenville =

Hester Grenville may refer to:

- Hester Grenville, 1st Countess Temple (1690–1752), English noblewoman
- Hester Pitt, Countess of Chatham (née Grenville, 1720–1803), wife of William Pitt the Elder
- Hester Grenville, mother of Hester Pitt and wife of Richard Grenville
- Hester Grenville (c. 1767–1847), niece of Hester Pitt and daughter of George Grenville
