= 1st Earl Temple =

1st Earl Temple may refer to:

- Richard Grenville (1678–1727), whose widow Hester Grenville, 1st Countess Temple inherited and created the title after his death
  - Richard Grenville-Temple, 2nd Earl Temple (1711–1779), in some sources called 1st Earl Temple
- Richard Temple-Nugent-Brydges-Chandos-Grenville, 1st Duke of Buckingham and Chandos, 1st Earl Temple of Stowe (1776–1839)

== See also ==
- Earl Temple
