= Louisa Stanhope, Countess Stanhope =

Louisa Stanhope, Countess Stanhope (28 July 1758 – 7 March 1829), formerly Louisa Grenville, was the second wife of Charles Stanhope, 3rd Earl Stanhope. Some sources have suggested her to be the same person as the contemporary novelist Louisa Sidney Stanhope, but there is no evidence for this other than the fact that the countess is known to have been a great reader.

Louisa was the daughter and sole heiress of Henry Grenville, a diplomat and politician, and his wife, the former Margaret Eleanor Banks. Grenville was a younger brother of Richard Grenville-Temple, 2nd Earl Temple, and of George Grenville, a British prime minister. She married the future earl on 19 March 1781, less than a year after the death of his first wife, Hester, who had been Louisa's first cousin, her mother, Hester Pitt, Countess of Chatham, being Henry Grenville's sister. There were three surviving daughters from Stanhope's first marriage, including Lady Hester Stanhope, who was later sent to live with her grandmother.

Stanhope inherited the earldom in 1786, making his wife a countess.

The couple had three sons:

- Philip Henry Stanhope, 4th Earl Stanhope (1781–1855), who inherited the earldom
- Maj. Hon. Charles Banks Stanhope (1785-1809), who was aide-de-camp to Sir John Moore and was killed at the Battle of Corunna
- Lt Col Hon. James Hamilton Stanhope (1788–1825) captain and lieutenant-colonel of the 1st Foot Guards. He married Frederica-Louisa William, daughter of the 3rd Earl Mansfield, and had one child

In 1806 Joseph Farington recorded that "Lord Stanhopes behaviour to his wife Lady Stanhope has caused her to obtain a separate maintenance." He went on to state that the earl had settled £1500 a year on his wife in order to escape the threat of being openly accused of adultery. Mrs Walburga Lackner, who had been taken on by the countess to give music lessons to her children, was left money in the earl's will.

Louisa died at her London home in Clarges Street, aged 70, after a long illness. John Pitt, 2nd Earl of Chatham, wrote to her eldest son on 10 March 1829 to express his condolences.
