= Hester Stanhope, Viscountess Mahon =

British noble (1755–1780)

Viscountess Mahon
- Born: Lady Hester Pitt; 19 October 1755
- Died: 20 July 1780 (aged 24)
- Spouse: Charles Stanhope, Viscount Mahon (m. 1774)
- Children: Lady Hester Stanhope; Lady Griselda Tekell; Lady Lucy Taylor
- Parent(s): William Pitt, 1st Earl of Chatham; Hester Grenville

Hester Stanhope, Viscountess Mahon (19 October 1755 – 20 July 1780), formerly Lady Hester Pitt, was the wife of Charles Stanhope, Viscount Mahon, later the 3rd Earl Stanhope.

She was the eldest daughter of William Pitt, 1st Earl of Chatham, by his wife, the former Hester Grenville (1720–1803), herself the daughter of the 1st Countess Temple. She was thus the sister of William Pitt the Younger, who, like their father, served as Prime Minister of the United Kingdom. She may have been born at the Pay Office, which was at the time her parents' residence.

Hester married Viscount Mahon on 19 December 1774. They had three children:

- Lady Hester Stanhope (1776–1839); a traveller and Arabist who died unmarried at the age of 63 in Syria.
- Lady Griselda Stanhope (21 July 1778 – 13 October 1851); married John Tekell.
- Lady Lucy Rachel Stanhope (20 February 1780 – 1 March 1814); eloped with and married Thomas Taylor of Sevenoaks, the family apothecary, and had children.

Their London house was in Harley Street. Following the birth of her third daughter, Lady Mahon suffered from puerperal fever, and was taken to Chevening for her health. She died there, aged 24, and was buried at St Botolph's Church, Chevening.

Stanhope remarried in 1781 to Louisa Grenville, his first wife's first cousin. He inherited his father's title in 1786, his older brother having predeceased him.
