= Louisa Stanhope =

English novelist

Louisa Sidney Stanhope (fl. 1806–1827) was an English novelist of the early 19th century. She wrote mainly historical and Gothic romances in profusion, counting as Britain's tenth most productive novelist in the 1800–1829 period. Her didactic novels were aimed mainly at younger female readers.

== Delicacy and strength ==
A scholar notes of The Age We Live In (1809) and Runnemede (1825) (and by implication of the others) that they are didactic novels aimed at younger female readers, for it was, in Stanhope's words, "requisite to pamper the insatiate palate of romance-readers; else would the page be cast aside, and the poor author stigmatized with dullness and insipidity." Her characters maintain a balance of feminine delicacy and strength of mind.

== Identification ==
Nothing seems known of the author personally. No evidence other than dates can identify her with Louisa Grenville (died 1829), second wife of Charles Stanhope, 3rd Earl Stanhope, from whom she separated in 1806, receiving a maintenance payment from him of £1500 a year.

== Novels ==
- Montbrasil Abbey: or, Maternal Trials (1806)
- The Bandit's Bride: or, The Maid of Saxony (1807)
  - French translation: L'Épouse du bandit, ou La Fille de Saxe (1810)
  - reprint: Rosaline; or, The Outlaw's Bride (1842)
- Striking Likenesses; or, The Votaries of Fashion (1808)
- The Age We Live In. A Novel (1809)
- Di Montranzo; or, The Novice of Corpus Domini. A Romance (1810)
- The Confessional of Valombre. A Romance (1812)
- Madelina. A Tale Founded on Facts (1814)
- Treachery; or, The Grave of Antoinette. A Romance Interspersed with Poetry (1815)
- The Nun of Santa Maria Di Tindaro (1818)
- The Crusaders. An Historical Romance, of the Twelfth Century (1820) – "a romance of moderate merit, but tolerably free from anachronisms" (Monthly Review quoted in Jarndyce Antiquarian Booksellers: "40 Highlights for the ABE London Rare Book Fair, June 7–9, 2019")
- The Festival of Mora. An Historical Romance (1821)
- The Siege of Kenilworth. An Historical Romance (1824)
- Runnemede. An Ancient Legend (1825)
- The Seer of Tiviotdale. A Romance (1827)
- Sydney Beresford. A Tale of the Day (British Library copy dated 1835)
