= 1st Duke of Buckingham =

1st Duke of Buckingham may refer to:

- George Villiers, 1st Duke of Buckingham (1592–1628), favourite of King James I of England
- Humphrey Stafford, 1st Duke of Buckingham (1402–1460), English nobleman
- John Sheffield, 1st Duke of Buckingham and Normanby (1647–1721), English poet
- Richard Temple-Grenville, 1st Duke of Buckingham and Chandos (1776–1839), Knight of the Garter
