= Henry Grenville =

British diplomat and politician

- Born: 11 September 1717
- Died: 22 April 1784 (aged 66)
- Occupations: a British diplomat and politician

Henry Grenville (11 September 1717 – 22 April 1784) was a British diplomat and politician.

Grenville was born into a family of politicians. His father was Sir Richard Grenville, MP; one of his elder brothers was Earl Temple, a government minister. Another brother, Thomas, was also an MP, and the third, James, was Lord of Trade and Cofferer of the Household. Another brother, George Grenville, rose to become Chancellor of the Exchequer under William Pitt the Elder and was later Prime Minister himself in 1763–1765.

Henry Grenville was MP for Bishop's Castle from 1759 to 1761. In the 1768 general election, he was elected to parliament for the constituency of Buckingham on George Grenville's slate.

Henry Grenville was Governor of Barbados from 1746. He was appointed British ambassador to the Ottoman Empire in Constantinople on 1 May 1761, but did not arrive until 21 February 1762. He was recalled only three years later on 31 May 1765, during the reign of Sultan Mustafa III.

He left Turkey to return to England on 13 October 1765 to become Commissioner of Customs before retiring to Bath, where he died in 1784.

Grenville married Margaret Eleanor Banks. Their daughter Louisa married the statesman and scientist Charles Stanhope, 3rd Earl Stanhope.

== Sources ==
- Turkey: Its History and Progress – the journals and correspondence of Sir James Porter. London, Hurst and Blackett. 1854.
- Wood, Alfred C. (1935). A History of the Levant Company. London.
