= Lady Hester Stanhope =

British aristocrat, antiquarian and archaeologist (1776–1839)

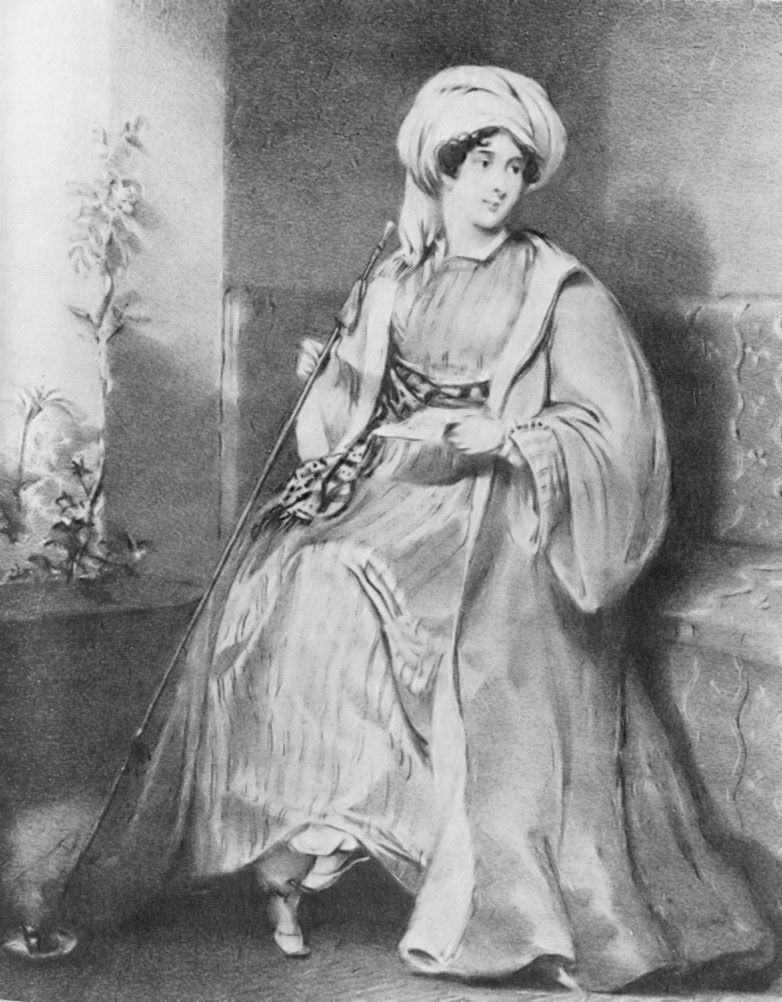
- Born: 12 March 1776; Chevening, Kent, England
- Died: 23 June 1839 (aged 63); Marjayoun, Lebanon
- Occupations: adventurer, writer, antiquarian
- Parent(s): Charles Stanhope, 3rd Earl Stanhope; Lady Hester Pitt
- Relatives: Philip Henry Stanhope (half-brother); James Hamilton Stanhope (half-brother); William Pitt the younger (uncle)

Lady Hester Lucy Stanhope (12 March 1776 – 23 June 1839) was a British adventurer, writer, antiquarian, and one of the most famous travellers of her age. Her excavation of Ascalon in 1815 is considered the first to use modern archaeological principles, and her use of a medieval Italian document is described as "one of the earliest uses of textual sources by field archaeologists". Her letters and memoirs made her famous as an explorer.

== Early life ==
Stanhope was the eldest child of Charles Stanhope, 3rd Earl Stanhope by his first wife, Lady Hester Pitt. She was born at her father's seat of Chevening and lived there until early in 1800, when she was sent to live with her grandmother, Hester Pitt, Countess of Chatham, at Burton Pynsent.

In August 1803, she moved into the home of her uncle, William Pitt the Younger, to manage his household and act as his hostess. In his position as British prime minister, Pitt, who was unmarried, needed help with political social life. Lady Hester sat at the head of his table and assisted in welcoming his guests; she became known for her beauty and conversational skills. When Pitt was out of the office she served as his private secretary. She was also the prime initiator of the gardens at Walmer Castle during his tenure as Lord Warden of the Cinque Ports. Britain awarded her an annual pension of £1200 after Pitt's death in January 1806.

After living for some time at Montagu Square in London, she moved to Wales and then left Great Britain for good in February 1810 after the death of her brother. A series of romantic disappointments may have prompted her decision to go on a long sea voyage. Her former lover Granville Leveson-Gower, 1st Earl Granville married another woman in 1809, and Stanhope's niece (Wilhelmina Powlett, Duchess of Cleveland) suspected she and Lieutenant-General Sir John Moore—with whom Stanhope enjoyed a warm correspondence while he was fighting in the Peninsular War—might have been considering marriage before his death in battle the same year.

== Life abroad ==
In February 1810, Stanhope left Portsmouth with her brother James Hamilton Stanhope, who accompanied her as far as Rhodes. Among her entourage were her physician and later biographer Charles Lewis Meryon and her maids Elizabeth Williams and Ann Fry. In Rhodes she met Michael Bruce, an adventurer and later MP, who became her lover and travelling companion. It is claimed that when the party arrived in Athens, the poet, Lord Byron, a university friend of Bruce's, dived into the sea to greet them. Byron later described Stanhope as "that dangerous thing, a female wit", and remarked that she had "a great disregard of received notion in her conversation as well as conduct". He later claimed that he chose not to engage in a debate on women's rights with Stanhope (a formidable conversationalist), because "I despise the sex too much to squabble with them." From Athens, Stanhope's party travelled on to Istanbul, capital of the Ottoman Empire. They intended to proceed to Cairo, only recently emerged from the chaos following Napoleon's invasion of Egypt and the international conflicts that followed.

=== Journey to the Near and Middle East ===
En route to Cairo, the ship encountered a storm and was shipwrecked on Rhodes. With all their possessions gone, the party borrowed Turkish clothing. Stanhope refused to wear a veil, choosing the garb of a Turkish male: robe, turban and slippers. When a British frigate took them to Cairo, she continued to wear clothing which was extremely unorthodox for an English woman: she bought a purple velvet robe, embroidered trousers, waistcoat, jacket, saddle and sabre. In this costume she went to greet the Pasha. From Cairo she continued her travels, and over a period of two years she visited Gibraltar, Malta, the Ionian Islands, the Peloponnese, Athens, Constantinople, Rhodes, Egypt, Palestine, Lebanon and Syria. She refused to wear a veil even in Damascus. In Jerusalem, the Church of the Holy Sepulchre was cleared of visitors and reopened in her honour.

Learning from fortune-tellers that her destiny was to become the bride of a new messiah, she made matrimonial overtures to Ibn Saud, chief of the Wahhabi Arabs and leader of the First Saudi State. She decided to visit the city of Palmyra, even though the route went through a desert with potentially hostile Bedouins. She dressed as a Bedouin and took with her a caravan of 22 camels to carry her baggage. Emir Mahannah el Fadel received her and she became known as "Queen Hester."

=== Archaeological expedition ===
According to Charles Meryon, she came into possession of a medieval Italian manuscript copied from the records of a monastery somewhere in Syria. According to this document, a great treasure was hidden under the ruins of a mosque at the port city of Tel Ashkelon which had been lying in ruins for 600 years. In 1815, on the strength of this map, she travelled to the ruins of Ashkelon on the Mediterranean coast north of Gaza, and persuaded the Ottoman authorities to allow her to excavate the site. The governor of Jaffa, Muhammad Abu Nabbut was ordered to accompany her. This resulted in the first archaeological excavation in Palestine.

While she did not find the hoard of three million gold coins reportedly buried there, the excavators unearthed a 2.1-metre (7 ft) headless marble statue. In an action which might seem at odds with her meticulous excavations, Stanhope ordered the statue to be smashed into "a thousand pieces" and thrown into the sea. She did this as a gesture of goodwill to the Ottoman government, in order to show that her excavation was intended to recover valuable treasures for them, and not to loot cultural relics for shipment back to Europe, as so many of her countrymen were doing at this time.

Her expedition paved the way for future excavations and tourism to the site.

In 1825, her brother James Hamilton Stanhope was found dead by suicide due to "temporary insanity" at his father in law's estate Kenwood House, he left Hester an annuity of £1500 a year.

=== Life among the Lebanese ===
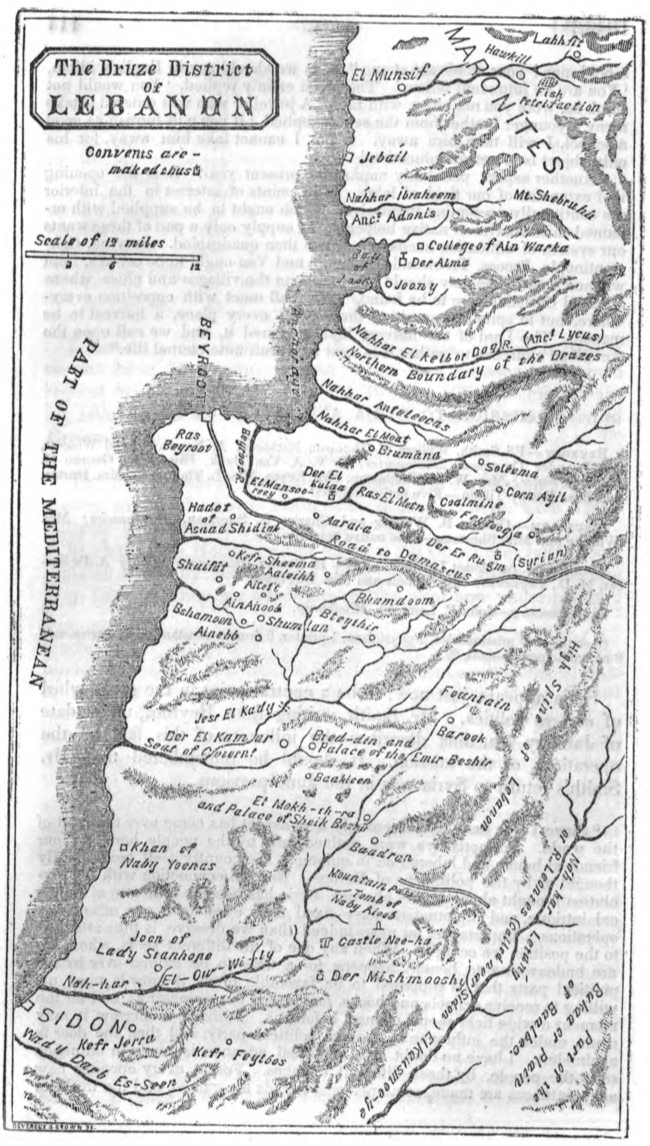
1844 map of Druze Lebanon, showing Lady Hester's residence on the bottom left corner.

Lady Hester settled near Sidon, a town on the Mediterranean coast in what is now Lebanon, about halfway between Tyre and Beirut. She lived first in the disused Mar Elias monastery at the village of Abra, and then in another monastery, Deir Mashmousheh, southwest of the Casa of Jezzine. Her companion, Miss Williams, and medical attendant, Dr Charles Meryon, remained with her for some time; but Miss Williams died in 1828, and Meryon left in 1831, only returning for a final visit from July 1837 to August 1838. When Meryon left for England, Lady Hester moved to a remote abandoned monastery at Joun, a village eight miles from Sidon, where she lived until her death. Her residence, known by the villagers as Dahr El Sitt, was at the top of a hill. Meryon implied that Hester liked the house because of its strategic location, "the house on the summit of a conical hill, whence comers and goers might be seen on every side."

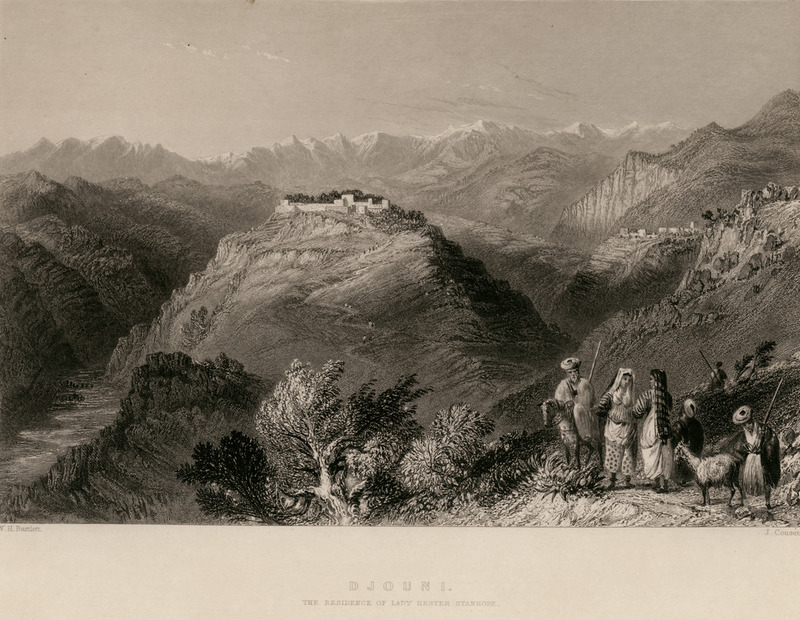
Lady Stanhope's résidence in Joun.

At first she was greeted by emir Bashir Shihab II, but over the years she gave sanctuary to hundreds of refugees of Druze inter-clan and inter-religious squabbles and earned his enmity. In her new setting, she wielded almost absolute authority over the surrounding districts and became the de facto ruler of the region. Her control over the local population was enough to cause Ibrahim Pasha, when about to invade Syria in 1832, to seek her neutrality. Her supremacy was maintained by her commanding character, and by the belief that she possessed the gift of divination. She kept up a correspondence with important people and received curious visitors who went out of their way to visit her.

Finding herself deeply in debt, she used her pension from England in order to pay off her creditors in Syria. From the mid-1830s she withdrew ever more from the world, and her servants began to steal her possessions, because she was less and less able to manage her household in her reclusive state. Stanhope may have suffered from severe depression; it has been suggested that, alternatively, she had become prematurely senile. At any rate, in her last years she would not receive visitors until dark, and even then, she would let them see only her hands and face. She wore a turban over her shaven head.

Lady Hester died in her sleep in 1839. She died destitute; Andrew Bonar and Robert Murray M'Cheyne, who visited the region a few weeks' later, reported that after her death, "not a para of money was found in the house."

== Memoirs ==
In 1846, some years after her death, Dr Meryon published three volumes of Memoirs of the Lady Hester Stanhope as related by herself in Conversations with her Physician, and these were followed in the succeeding year by three volumes of Travels of Lady Hester Stanhope, forming the Completion of her Memoirs narrated by her Physician.

== In the media ==
- 1837: Letitia Elizabeth Landon's poetical illustration "Djouni: the Residence of Lady Hester Stanhope". to an engraving of a painting by William Henry Bartlett was published in Fisher's Drawing Room Scrap Book, 1838.
- 1844: In Eothen by Alexander Kinglake, chapter VIII is devoted to Lady Hester Stanhope
- 1859: The Land and the Book gives an account of her funeral, which William McClure Thomson presided over, and a description of her palace and her last years.
- 1866: John Greenleaf Whittier's best-known poem, “Snow-Bound”, includes a description of a visit to Stanhope by the American preacher Harriet Livermore, "startling on her desert throne | The crazy Queen of Lebanon."
- 1876: George Eliot's novel Daniel Deronda mentions Lady Hester Stanhope, book one, chapter seven, speaking of her as "Queen of the East".
- 1876: Louisa May Alcott's novel Rose in Bloom mentions Lady Hester Stanhope, chapter 2.
- 1882: William Henry Davenport Adams's non-fiction book Celebrated Women Travellers of the Nineteenth Century devotes a chapter to Lady Hester Stanhope.
- 1913: Lady Hester Lucy Stanhope by Frank Hamel published by Cassell.
- 1922: Hester Stanhope's travels are recalled by Molly Bloom in Ulysses by James Joyce.
- 1924: Hester Stanhope's story is told by Pierre Benoit in "Lebanon's Lady of the Manor"
- 1934: H. V. Morton briefly tells Hester Stanhope's story and describes his visit to the remains of her house in Joun, and her grave, in "In the Steps of the Master", Chapter 8.
- 1958: Lady Hester Stanhope is referred to in the English author Georgette Heyer's historical romance novel of the Regency period entitled Venetia, Chapter 4.
- 1951: The Nun of Lebanon. The Love Affair of Lady Hester Stanhope and Michael Bruce. Their Newly Discovered Letters edited by Ian Bruce, a collection of letters from Hester Stanhope and Ian Bruce, 1810-1816, discovered by the Bruce family in 1944.
- 1961: In the novel Herzog by Saul Bellow, Herzog compares his wife's writing style to that of Lady Hester Stanhope.
- 1962: In the film Lawrence of Arabia, Prince Faisal suggests Lawrence is "another of these desert-loving Englishmen" and mentions Stanhope as an example.
- 1967: Lady Hester Stanhope was the basis for the character of Great-Aunt Harriet in Mary Stewart's novel The Gabriel Hounds.
- 1978: In Chapter 1 of the autobiographical novel The Garden of the Gods by Gerald Durrell, Gerald's brother, Larry, inquires of their mother, "But what are you doing rolling about with a Turk at this hour? Practising to be Lady Hester Stanhope?"
- 1986: In the 1986 TV movie Harem, the character Lady Ashley was very loosely based on Lady Hester Stanhope. See Harem (1986 TV Movie)
- 1995: Queen of the East, television movie about Stanhope, starring Jennifer Saunders ISBN 0-7733-2303-1
- 2014: Brett Josef Grubisic's comic novel, This Location of Unknown Possibilities, describes an abandoned Canada-set attempt to produce a television biopic about Lady Hester Stanhope's travels.
- 2023: De sable et de feu (Sand and Fire) shows some of her life. It includes a close relationship between her and Ali Bey el Abbassi; but there is no evidence she ever knew him.
- 2024: The Diamond of London by Andrea Penrose is a biographical novel based on the life of Lady Hester Stanhope as she fights convention in pursuit of freedom and adventure.

== See also ==
- Archaeology of Israel
- List of women explorers and travelers
- Timeline of women in science
