= Charles Stanhope, 3rd Earl Stanhope =

British scientist (1753–1816)

The Right Honourable The Earl Stanhope FRS
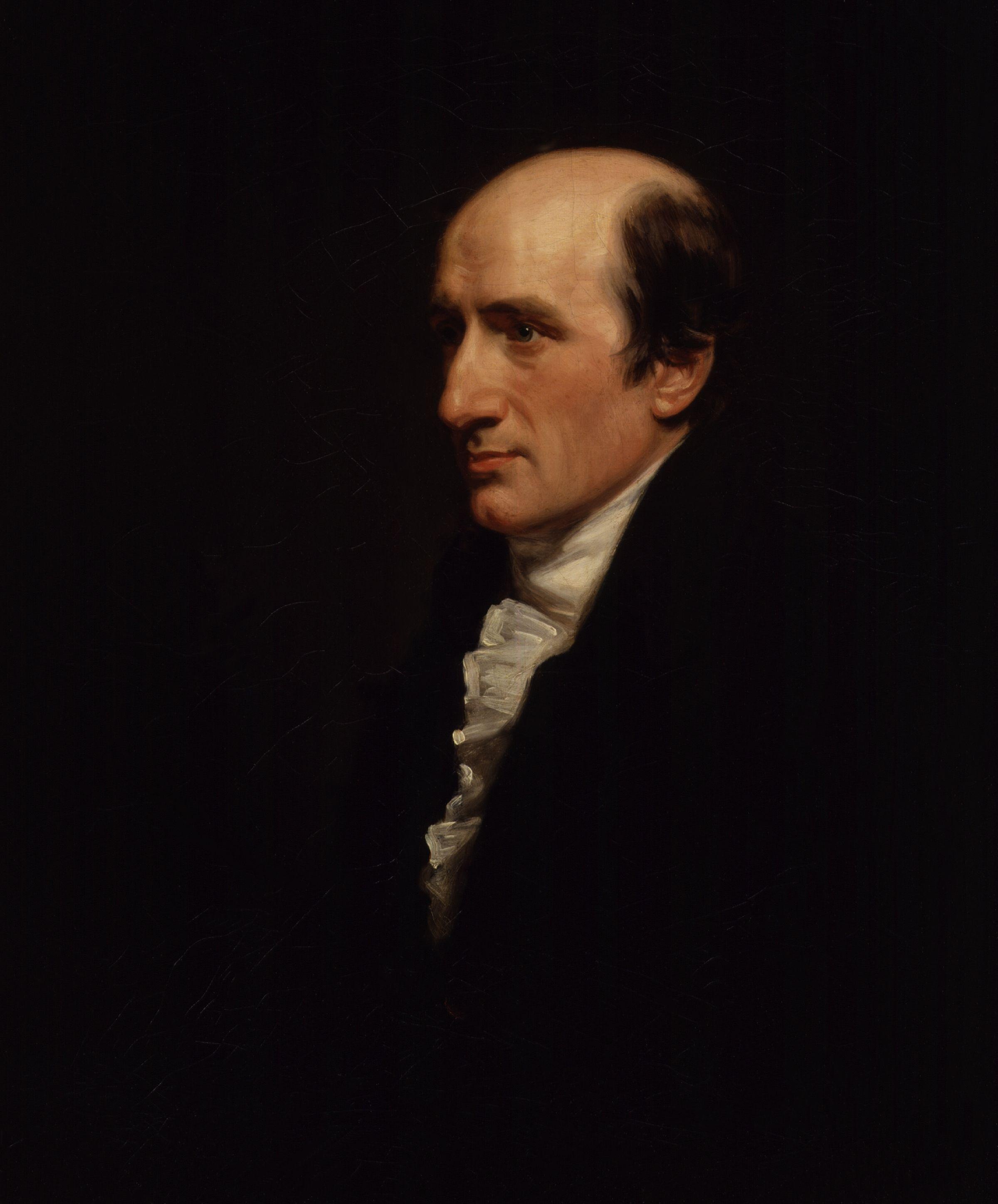
- Portrait of Earl Stanhope by John Opie

Member of Parliament for Wycombe with Robert Waller
- In office 18 October 1780 – 1786
- Preceded by: Thomas FitzMaurice
- Succeeded by: Earl Wycombe

Personal details
- Born: 3 August 1753
- Died: 15 December 1816 (aged 63)
- Party: Whig
- Spouse(s): Lady Hester Pitt; Louisa Grenville
- Children: 6
- Parent(s): Philip Stanhope, 2nd Earl Stanhope; Grizel Hamilton

Charles Stanhope, 3rd Earl Stanhope, FRS (3 August 1753 – 15 December 1816), at one time referred to as Charles Mahon, was a British statesman, inventor, and scientist. He was the father of Lady Hester Stanhope and brother-in-law of William Pitt the Younger. He is sometimes confused with an exact contemporary of his, Charles Stanhope, 3rd Earl of Harrington.

== Early life ==
The son of Philip Stanhope, 2nd Earl Stanhope, he was educated at Eton and the University of Geneva. Whilst in Geneva he devoted himself to the study of mathematics under Georges-Louis Le Sage, and acquired from Switzerland an intense love of liberty.

== Politics ==
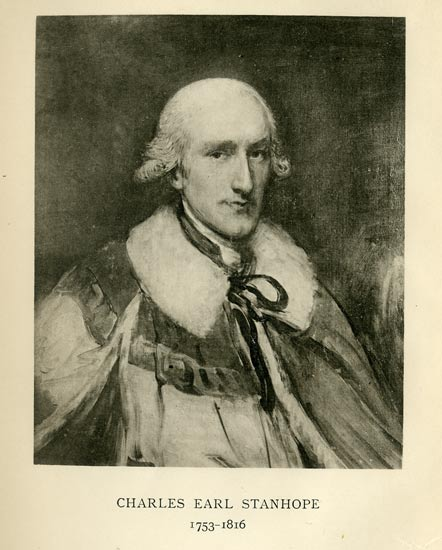
Lord Stanhope

In politics he was a democrat. As Lord Mahon he contested the Westminster constituency without success in 1774, when he was only just of age; but from the general election of 1780 until his being raised to the peerage on 7 March 1786 he represented through the influence of Lord Shelburne the Buckinghamshire borough of High Wycombe. During the sessions of 1783 and 1784 he supported William Pitt the Younger, whose sister, Lady Hester Pitt, he married on 19 December 1774. He was close enough to Pitt to be singled out for ridicule in the Rolliad:

——This Quixote of the Nation
Beats his own Windmills in gesticulation;
To strike, not please, his utmost force he bends,
And all his sense is at his fingers' ends, [&c. &c.]

When Pitt strayed from the Liberal principles of his early days, his brother-in-law severed their political connection and opposed the arbitrary measures which the ministry favoured. Lord Stanhope's character was generous, and his conduct consistent; but his speeches were not influential.

He was the chairman of the "Revolution Society", founded in honour of the Glorious Revolution of 1688; the members of the society in 1790 expressed their sympathy with the aims of the French Revolution. In 1794 Stanhope supported Thomas Muir, one of the Edinburgh politicians who were transported to Botany Bay; and in 1795 he introduced into the Lords a motion deprecating any interference with the internal affairs of France. In all these points he was hopelessly beaten, and in the last of them he was in a "minority of one"—a sobriquet which stuck to him throughout life—whereupon he seceded from parliamentary life for five years.

== Business, science and writing ==
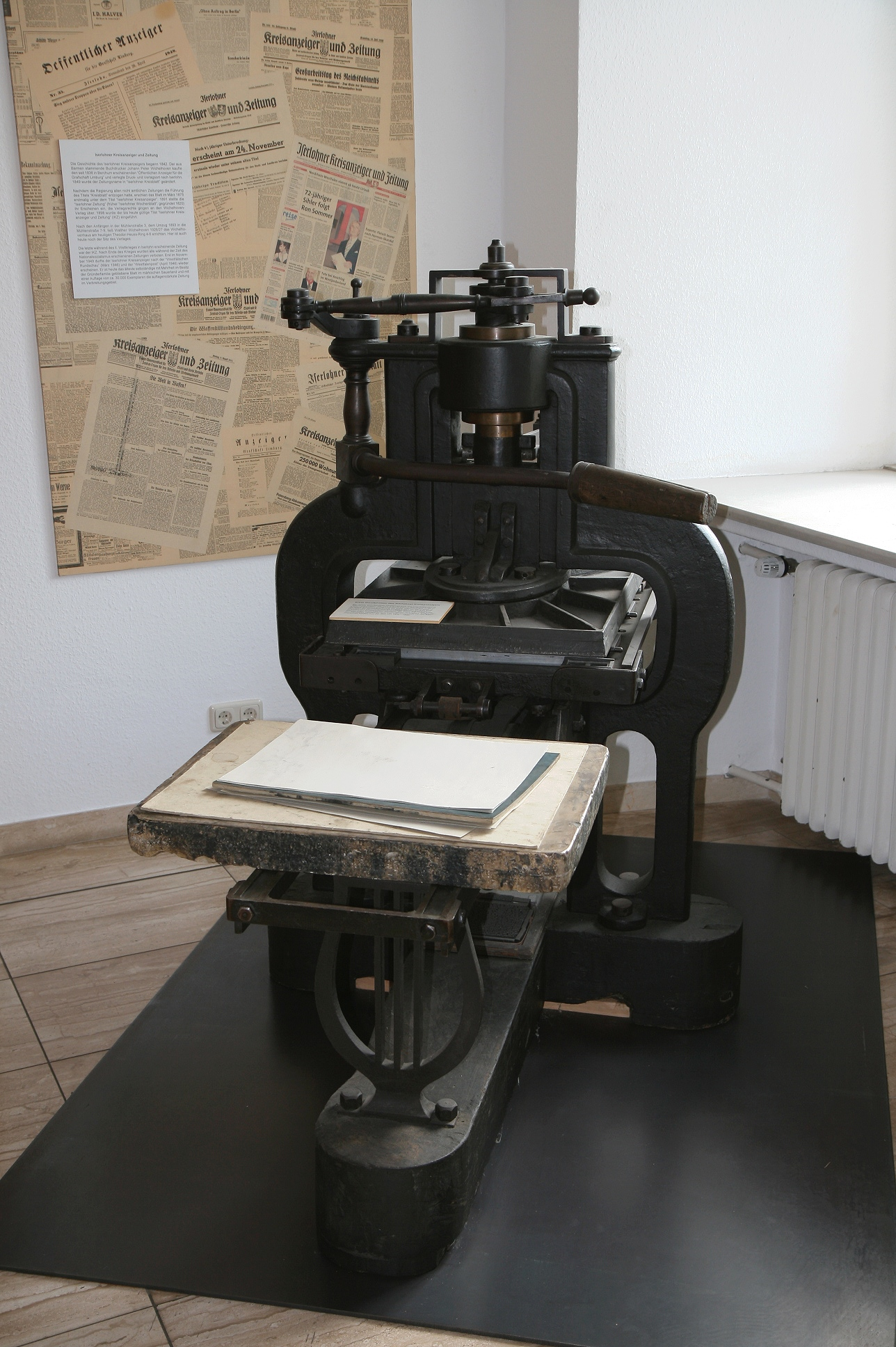
Stanhope printing press

Stanhope was an accomplished scientist. He first developed this interest during his university studies in Geneva. Electricity was one of the subjects that he studied, and the volume of Principles of Electricity which he issued in 1779 contained the rudiments of his theory on the "return stroke" resulting from the contact with the earth of the electric current of lightning, which were afterwards amplified in a contribution to the Philosophical Transactions for 1787. He was elected a fellow of the Royal Society so early as November 1772, and devoted a large part of his income to experiments in science and philosophy. He invented a method of securing buildings from fire (which, however, proved impracticable), the first iron printing press, a method to produce plaster moulds of pages to be printed and then cast solid metal printing plates from them (stereotype matrix and stereotype plate), and the lens, all of which bear his name, as well as a monochord for tuning musical instruments, improvements in canal locks, experiments in steam navigation in 1795–1797, and two calculating machines (first in 1775). He was a member of the American Philosophical Society, elected in 1774.

When he acquired extensive property in Devon, Stanhope projected a canal through that county from the Bristol to the English Channel and took the levels himself.

His principal labours in literature consisted of a reply to Edmund Burke's Reflections on the Revolution in France (1790) and an Essay on the rights of juries (1792), and he long meditated the compilation of a digest of the statutes.

Stanhope was elected a member of the American Antiquarian Society in 1816.

== Marriages and children ==
Stanhope married twice. Firstly on 19 December 1774 to Lady Hester Pitt (19 October 1755 – 20 July 1780), daughter of William Pitt, 1st Earl of Chatham ("Pitt the Elder"), Prime Minister of the United Kingdom, by whom he had three daughters:

- Lady Hester Lucy Stanhope (1776–1839), a traveller and Arabist who died unmarried at the age of 63 in Syria.
- Lady Griselda Stanhope (21 July 1778 – 13 October 1851), wife of John Tekell.
- Lady Lucy Rachel Stanhope (20 February 1780 – 1 March 1814) who eloped with Thomas Taylor of Sevenoaks, the family apothecary, following which her father refused to be reconciled to her; but Pitt made her husband Controller-General of Customs, and his son was one of the Earl of Chatham's executors.

Secondly in 1781 he married Louisa Grenville (1758–1829), daughter and sole heiress of the Hon. Henry Grenville (Governor of Barbados in 1746 and ambassador to the Ottoman Porte in 1762; he was the younger brother of Richard Grenville-Temple, 2nd Earl Temple, and of George Grenville). Her mother was Margaret Eleanor Banks. Louisa survived Stanhope, and died in March 1829. By her he had three sons:

- Philip Henry Stanhope, 4th Earl Stanhope (1781–1855), eldest son and heir, who inherited many of his father's scientific tastes.
- Maj. Hon. Charles Banks Stanhope (3 June 1785 – 16 January 1809), aide-de-camp to John Moore. He was killed at the Battle of Corunna
- Lt Col Hon. James Hamilton Stanhope (1788–1825), captain and lieutenant-colonel of the 1st Foot Guards.

== Death and succession ==
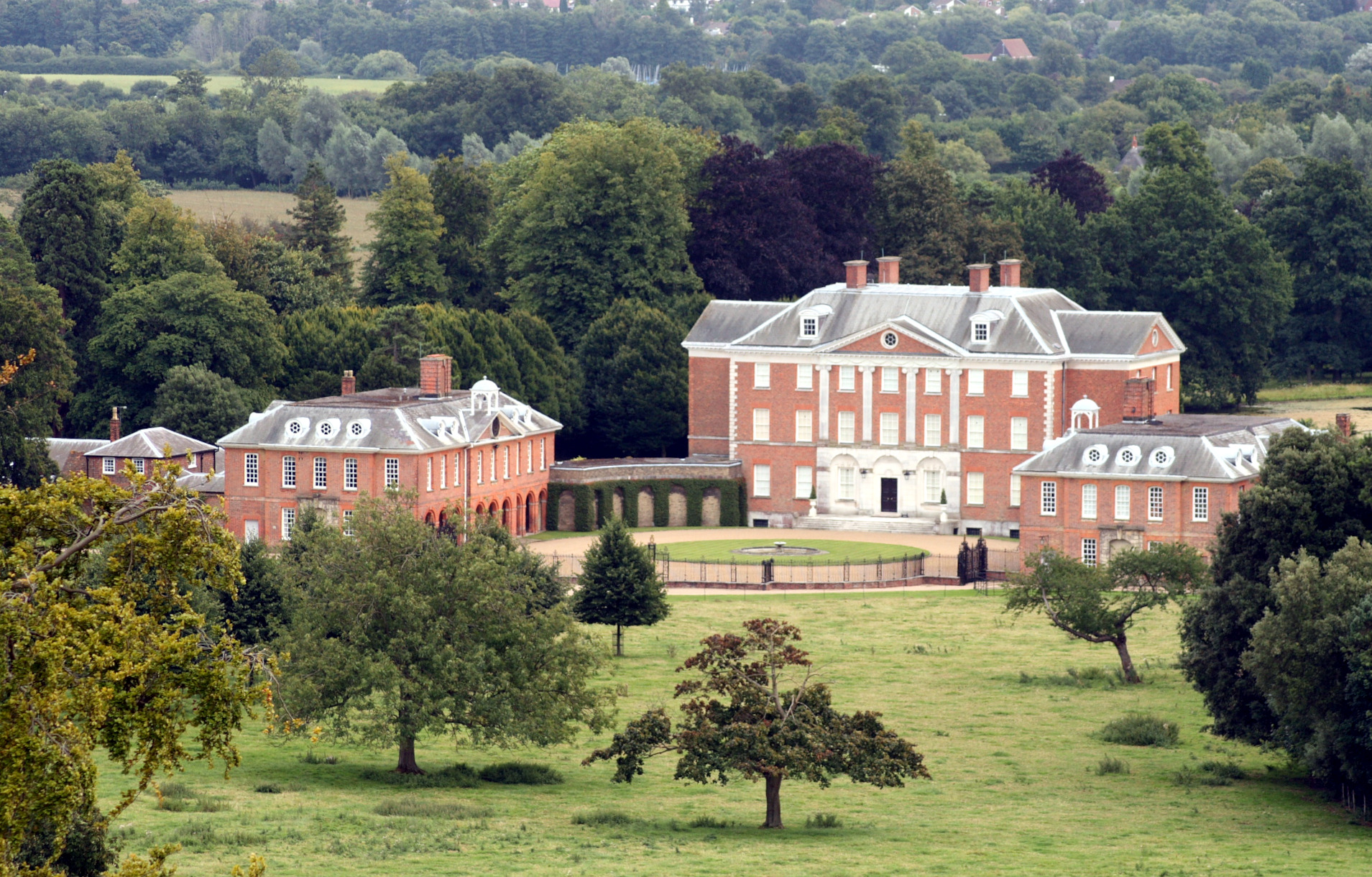
Chevening House, Kent

Lord Stanhope died at the family seat of Chevening in Kent, and was succeeded in the title by his eldest son, who shared much of his father's scientific interest but is known also for his association with Kaspar Hauser. Lord Stanhope's monument at Chevening was sculpted by Josephus Pinnix Kendrick.

== Bibliography ==
- Thomson, T. (1818), "Biographical account of Lord Stanhope", Annals of Philosophy, Robert Baldwin: 81–85
- Horace Hart (1896) Charles Earl Stanhope and the Oxford University Press @ Internet Archive

Parliament of Great Britain
Preceded by Robert Waller; Hon. Thomas FitzMaurice	Member of Parliament for Wycombe; 1780–1786; With: Robert Waller	Succeeded by Robert Waller; Earl Wycombe
Peerage of Great Britain
Preceded by Philip Stanhope	Earl Stanhope; 1786–1816	Succeeded by Philip Henry Stanhope
