= Sir Henry Lyttelton, 2nd Baronet =

English politician

Member of Parliament for Lichfield
- In office March 1678 – October 1679

Personal details
- Born: 1624
- Died: 24 June 1693 (aged 68–69)

Sir Henry Lyttelton, 2nd Baronet (1624 – 24 June 1693) was an English politician and member of the Lyttelton family. He was a Royalist officer during the English Civil War. After the Restoration, from 1678 to 1679 he sat in the House of Commons.

== Biography ==
Lyttelton was the eldest surviving son of Sir Thomas Lyttelton, 1st Baronet (1593–1650), from whom he inherited the family estates in Frankley, Halesowen, Hagley, and Upper Arley in 1649. He joined the Royalist forces at the Battle of Worcester in 1651, where they were routed by the Parliamentarians, and consequentially spent 17 months imprisoned in the Tower of London. He was nevertheless appointed High Sheriff of Worcestershire for 1654–1656.

He was elected member of parliament for Lichfield in 1678 and sat until 1679.

== Family ==
Lyttelton married twice: firstly Philadelphia, the daughter and co-heiress of the Hon. Thomas Carey, groom of the bedchamber to Charles I and secondly Lady Elizabeth Newport, daughter of Francis Newport, 1st Earl of Bradford. He had no male heir and was succeeded in the baronetcy by his brother.

== Notes ==
Parliament of England
Preceded by Sir Theophilus Biddulph, Bt; Richard Dyott	Member of Parliament for Lichfield; 1678–1679; With: Sir Theophilus Biddulph, Bt 1678–1679; Sir Michael Biddulph, Bt 1679	Succeeded by Daniel Finch; Sir Michael Biddulph, Bt
Baronetage of England
Preceded by Thomas Lyttelton	Baronet (of Frankley); 1650–1693	Succeeded by Charles Lyttelton
