= Algernon Temple-Gore-Langton, 5th Earl Temple of Stowe =

Portrait by Walter Stoneman, c. 1916

Algernon William Stephen Temple-Gore-Langton, 5th Earl Temple of Stowe (9 November 1871 – 19 February 1940) was an English soldier, diplomat, and peer, with a seat in the House of Lords from 1902 until his death.

The son of William Temple-Gore-Langton, 4th Earl Temple of Stowe and his wife Helen Mabel Graham-Montgomery, he was educated at Eton and Christ Church, Oxford, where he graduated BA in 1896. He was then commissioned into the Coldstream Guards and was later a Captain in the 3rd Battalion the Somerset Light Infantry. He joined the Diplomatic Service and on 28 March 1902 succeeded his father as Earl Temple of Stowe in the peerage of the United Kingdom. He became a Justice of the Peace for Somerset.

On 25 January 1913 Earl Temple married Agnes de Laporte, a daughter of Charles de Laporte, but they had no children.

In the 1920s, Earl Temple was an early member of the British Fascists.

He died on 19 February 1940.

== Notes ==
Peerage of the United Kingdom
Preceded by William Temple-Gore-Langton	Earl Temple of Stowe; 1902–1940	Succeeded by Chandos Grenville Temple-Gore-Langton
