= Lady Anna Gore-Langton =

English women's rights campaigner

- Born: February 1820; Stowe House, Buckinghamshire, England
- Died: 3 February 1879 (aged 59); London, England
- Occupation: Women's rights activist
- Spouse: William Gore-Langton (m. 1846; died 1873)
- Children: William Temple-Gore-Langton, 4th Earl Temple of Stowe
- Parents: Richard, Earl Temple (father); Lady Mary Campbell (mother)
- Relatives: Richard, 3rd Duke of Buckingham and Chandos (brother)

Lady Anna Eliza Mary Gore-Langton, née Temple-Nugent-Brydges-Chandos-Grenville (February 1820 – 3 February 1879) was an English campaigner for women's rights.

== Life ==
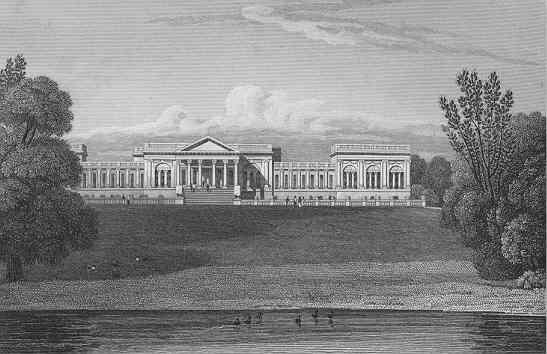
Stowe House (in 1829) was her ancestral home

Lady Anna Temple-Nugent-Brydges-Chandos-Grenville was born in February 1820 to Richard, Earl Temple (later Duke of Buckingham and Chandos), and his wife, the former Lady Mary Campbell, at the ancestral seat of Stowe House. Lady Anna's father spent a vast inheritance and was declared a bankrupt. The contents of Stowe House were sold in 1848. Her parents obtained a divorce by act of parliament in 1850.

She avoided the sale and divorce as she married in 1846 and went to live at Newton Park. Her husband William Gore-Langton was a Member of Parliament. Their son William inherited in 1889 the title of Earl Temple of Stowe from her family for a special remainder.

She worked with the Women's Printing Society and she was in the vanguard of improving women's education. She sat on the committee in 1871 that was ensuring that women could become doctors in Edinburgh.

In 1872 she was elected president of the Bath committee of the National Society for Women's Suffrage. She had signed the Mill's petition for universal women's suffrage six years before. In June 1877 she and others were allowed to petition Sir Stafford Northcote, the Chancellor of the Exchequer, concerning a bill to allow women the vote. The bill was presented by Jacob Bright, but it was defeated. Gore-Langton called a meeting to discuss a way forward given the large defeat at her house.

Gore-Langton died in London on 3 February 1879.
