= Grenville Temple-Gore-Langton, 8th Earl Temple of Stowe =

Walter Grenville Algernon Temple-Gore-Langton, 8th Earl Temple of Stowe (2 October 1924 – 17 September 2013) was a British peer, a member of the House of Lords from 1988 until 1999.

The son of Lt.-Commander the Hon. Evelyn Arthur Grenville Temple-Gore-Langton and his wife Irene Maria Gartside-Spaight, he was educated at the Nautical College, Pangbourne. In 1988 he succeeded as Earl Temple of Stowe.

He married, firstly, Zillah Ray Boxall, daughter of James Boxall, on 24 July 1954, and before she died on 12 October 1966 they had three children:

- James Grenville Temple-Gore-Langton, 9th Earl Temple of Stowe (born 1955)
- Robert Chandos Temple-Gore-Langton (born 1957)
- Lady Anna Clare Temple-Gore-Langton (born 1960)

On 1 June 1968, Temple of Stowe married secondly Margaret Elizabeth Graham Scarth (Elizabeth), only surviving daughter of Colonel Henry William Scarth and Mary Beatrix Robertson of the Breckness Estate, Sandwick, Orkney.
