= Hester Grenville, 1st Countess Temple =

British aristocrat

The Right Honourable The Countess Temple

Countess Temple
- In office 1749–1752
- Preceded by: New creation
- Succeeded by: Richard Grenville-Temple

Viscountess Cobham
- In office 1749–1752
- Preceded by: Richard Temple
- Succeeded by: Richard Grenville-Temple

Personal details
- Born: Hester Temple bapt. 7 May 1684
- Died: 6 October 1752 (aged 68)
- Spouse: Richard Grenville (m. 1710; died 1727)
- Children: Richard Grenville-Temple, 2nd Earl Temple; George Grenville; James Grenville; Henry Grenville; Thomas Grenville; Hester Pitt, Countess of Chatham
- Parent(s): Sir Richard Temple, 3rd Baronet; Mary Knapp
- Relatives: William Pitt the Younger (grandson); Richard Temple, 1st Viscount Cobham (brother)

Hester Grenville, 1st Countess Temple, 2nd Viscountess Cobham (née Temple; bapt. 7 May 1684 – 6 October 1752) was an English noblewoman. She was the mother and grandmother of the father-son Prime Ministers George Grenville and William Grenville; she is also mother-in-law and grandmother of the father-son Prime Ministers William Pitt, 1st Earl of Chatham and William Pitt the Younger through her eponymous daughter Hester (1720–1803).

== Life and family ==
She was the daughter (and eventual co-heir) of Sir Richard Temple, 3rd Bt. (1634–1697), of Stowe, Buckinghamshire, and his wife, Mary Knapp.

Hester married Richard Grenville of Wotton in Buckinghamshire on 25 November 1710, and became the mother of five sons, all of whom served as members of parliament:

- Richard Grenville-Temple, 2nd Earl Temple (1711–1779), MP.
- George Grenville (1712–1770), MP; was Prime Minister of Great Britain from 1763 to 1765. He married Elizabeth Wyndham and had children. (George's son, William Grenville, 1st Baron Grenville, also became prime minister.)
- James Grenville (1715–1783), MP; served as a minister under his brother-in-law William Pitt the Younger. He married Mary Smyth and had children.
- Henry Grenville (1717–1784), MP; married Margaret Eleanor Banks and had children.
- Thomas Grenville (1719–1747), MP; a Royal Navy officer, who died at sea, aged 28, unmarried.

Her daughter, Hester (1720–1803), was the wife of William Pitt the Elder and mother of William Pitt the Younger, who both became prime minister.

Hester was the sister of Richard Temple, 1st Viscount Cobham, whose title she inherited under a special remainder in 1749; on 18 October of the same year, her husband being long dead, she was created 1st Countess Temple. Lord Cobham had excluded from succession his nephews Temple West and Gilbert West (who were sons of his elder sister Maria and Richard West), and also his other sister Penelope.

Peerage of Great Britain
New creation	Countess Temple; 1749–1752	Succeeded by Richard Grenville-Temple
Preceded by Richard Temple	Viscountess Cobham; 1749–1752	Succeeded by Richard Grenville-Temple
