= Hester Pitt, Countess of Chatham =

British noblewoman (1720–1803)

The Right Honourable The Countess of Chatham
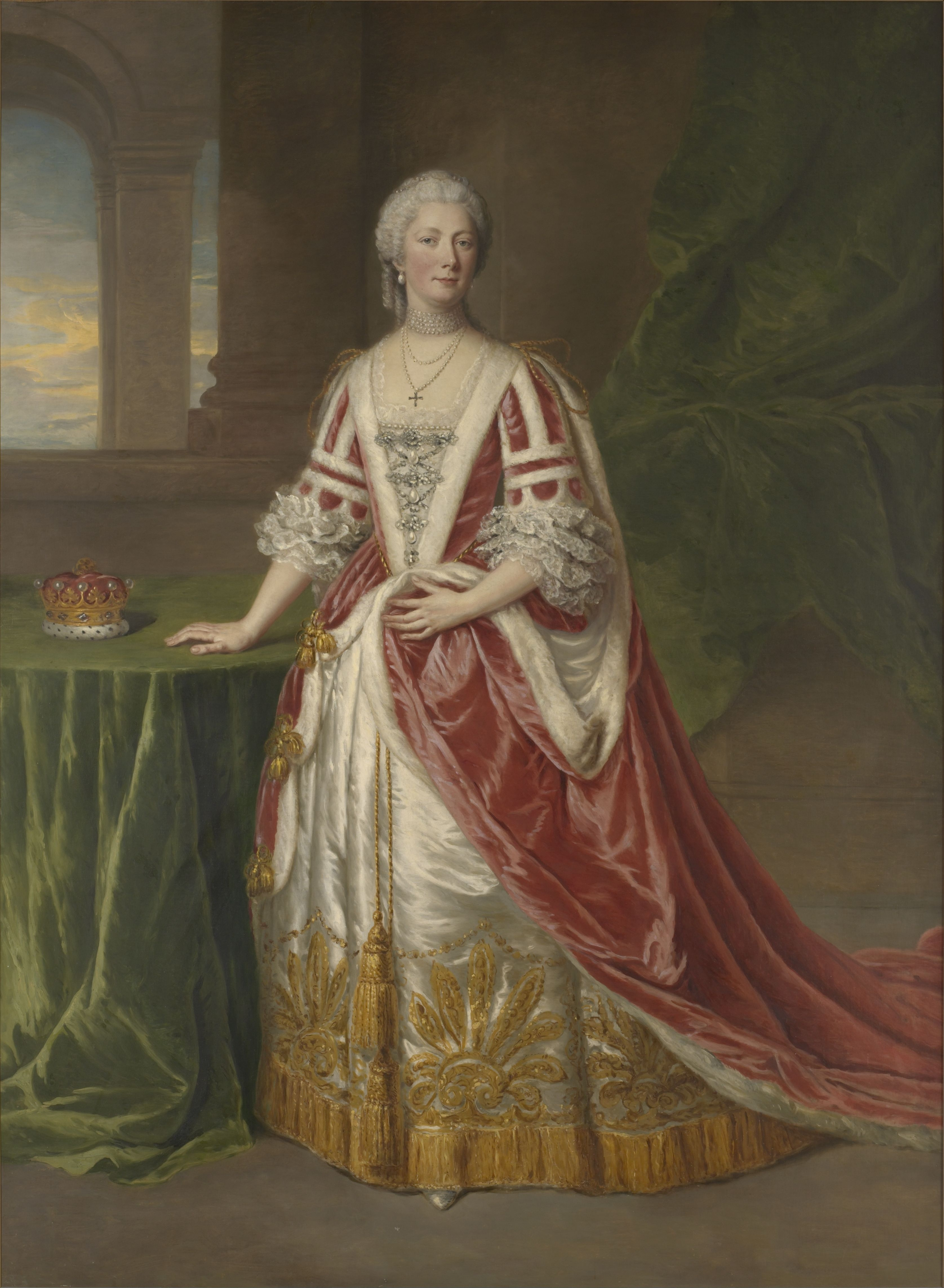
- Portrait by William Hoare, c. 1766
- Born: Hester Grenville; 8 November 1720; London, England
- Died: 9 April 1803 (aged 82); Burton Pynsent, Somerset, England
- Buried: Westminster Abbey
- Spouse: The Earl of Chatham (m. 1754; died 1778)
- Issue: Hester Stanhope, Viscountess Mahon; John Pitt, 2nd Earl of Chatham; Lady Harriet Eliot; William Pitt the Younger; Hon James Charles Pitt
- Parents: Richard Grenville; Hester Grenville, 1st Countess Temple

Hester Pitt, Countess of Chatham (née Grenville; 8 November 1720 – 9 April 1803) was the wife of William Pitt the Elder, 1st Earl of Chatham, who was prime minister of Great Britain from 1766 to 1768.

The sister of George Grenville, who was prime minister from 1763 to 1765, she was also the mother of Prime Minister William Pitt the Younger and a niece of the noted Whig politician Richard Temple, 1st Viscount Cobham, who had served as her husband's mentor.

Chatham and Elizabeth Grenville, her sister-in-law, are the only two women in British history to have been both the wife of a prime minister and the mother of another prime minister.

== Early life ==
Born on 8 November 1720 in London, she was the only daughter of Richard Grenville and Hester Grenville, 1st Countess Temple.

== Marriage ==
At 34, Lady Hester married Whig politician William Pitt on 16 November 1754 at her home in Argyle Street, London, by Francis Ayscough under special licence. They had five children:

- Lady Hester Pitt (19 October 1755 – 20 July 1780), who married Viscount Mahon, later the 3rd Earl Stanhope, on 19 December 1774; three children, including the traveler and Arabist Lady Hester Stanhope.
- John Pitt, 2nd Earl of Chatham (9 October 1756 – 24 September 1835), who married The Hon. Mary Townshend; no issue.
- Lady Harriet Pitt (18 April 1758 – 1786), who married The Hon. Edward James Eliot, oldest son of the 1st Baron Eliot, in 1785; one child.
- Hon. William Pitt the Younger (28 May 1759 – 23 January 1806), who also served as prime minister; never married.
- Hon. James Charles Pitt (1761 – 13 November 1780), Royal Navy officer and died in Antigua; never married.

On 4 December 1761, she was created "Baroness Chatham", of Chatham, in the County of Kent", with remainder to her sons by William Pitt. Her husband was created Earl of Chatham in 1766.

Peerage of the United Kingdom
New creation	Baroness Chatham; 1761–1803	Succeeded by John Pitt
