= Temple baronets =

Set index for Temple baronets

There have been four baronetcies created for persons with the surname Temple, two in the Baronetage of England, one in the Baronetage of Nova Scotia and one in the Baronetage of the United Kingdom. As of 2026 two of the creations are extant.

- Temple baronets of Stowe (1611): see Viscount Cobham
- Temple baronets (1662): see Sir Thomas Temple, 1st Baronet (1614–1674)
- Temple baronets of Sheen (1666): see Sir William Temple, 1st Baronet (1628–1699)
- Temple baronets of The Nash (1876)
