= Richard Temple-Nugent-Brydges-Chandos-Grenville, 1st Duke of Buckingham and Chandos =

British landowner and politician (1776–1839)

His Grace The Duke of Buckingham and Chandos KG PC
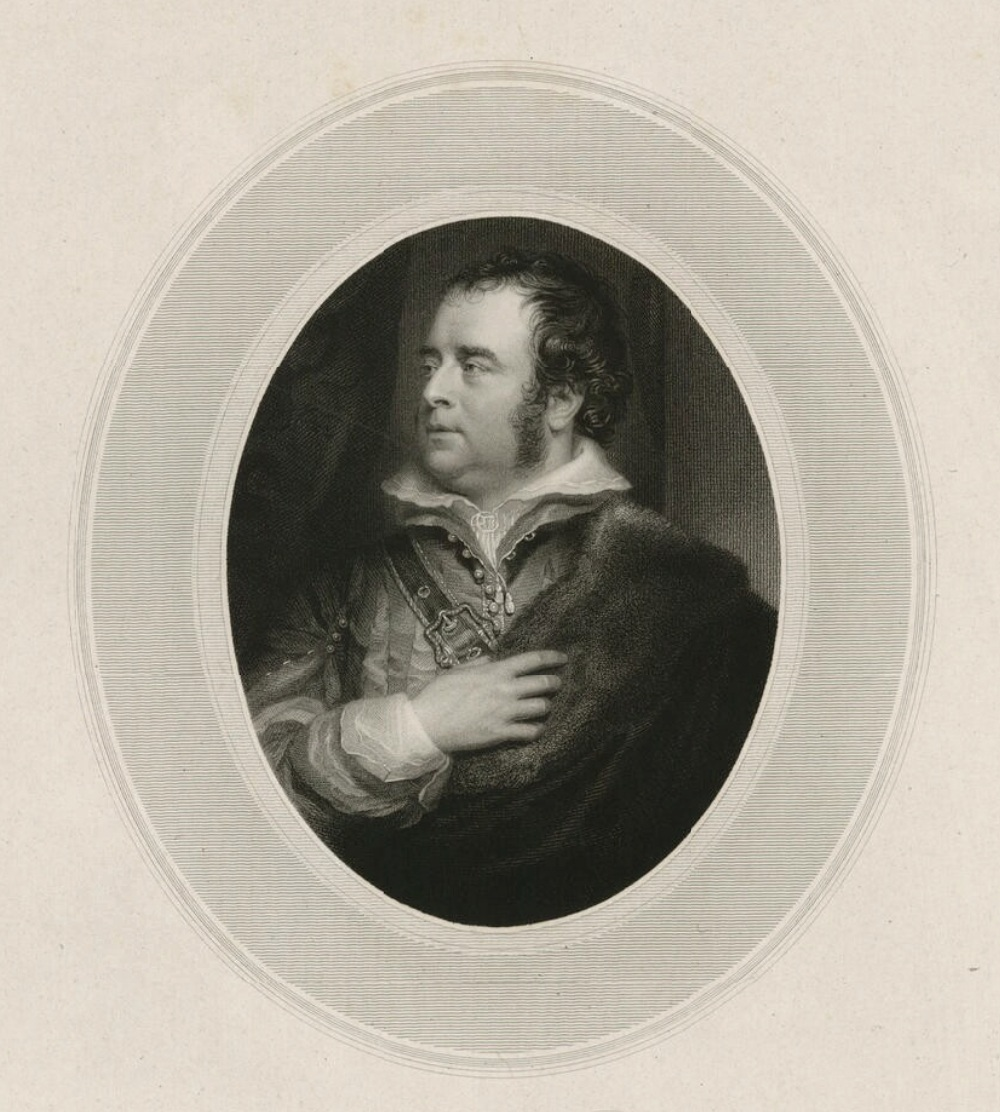
- Engraving by Robert Cooper after a George Sanders portrait, 1815

Lord Steward of the Household
- In office 28 July 1830 – 1830
- Monarch: William IV
- Prime Minister: The Duke of Wellington
- Preceded by: The Marquess Conyngham
- Succeeded by: The Marquess Wellesley

Personal details
- Born: 20 March 1776
- Died: 17 January 1839 (aged 62)
- Resting place: Wotton Underwood
- Spouse: Lady Anne Brydges (m. 1796)
- Children: The 2nd Duke of Buckingham and Chandos
- Parents: The 1st Marquess of Buckingham (father); Lady Mary Nugent (mother)

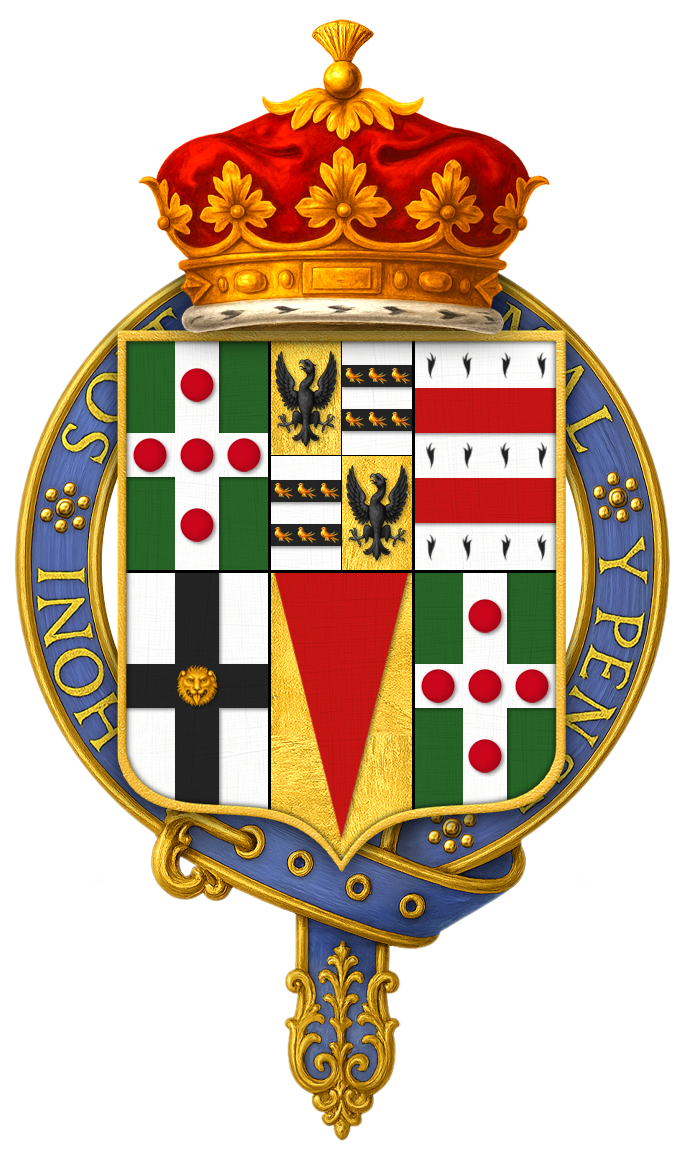
Quartered arms of Richard Temple-Nugent-Brydges-Chandos-Grenville, 1st Duke of Buckingham and Chandos

Richard Temple-Nugent-Brydges-Chandos-Grenville, 1st Duke of Buckingham and Chandos (20 March 1776 – 17 January 1839), styled Earl Temple from 1784 to 1813 and known as the Marquess of Buckingham from 1813 to 1822, was a British landowner and politician.

== Background ==
Born Richard Temple-Nugent-Grenville, he was the eldest son of George Nugent-Temple-Grenville, 1st Marquess of Buckingham, son of George Grenville, Prime Minister of Great Britain. His mother was Lady Mary Nugent, daughter of Robert Nugent, 1st Earl Nugent. Thomas Grenville and Lord Grenville were his uncles.

He was educated at Brasenose College, Oxford, where he matriculated in 1791.

== Political career ==
Earl Temple, as he was known in his father's lifetime, was elected Member of Parliament for Buckinghamshire in 1797.

When the Napoleonic Wars resumed in 1803 his father as Lord Lieutenant of Buckinghamshire commissioned him as colonel of the Royal Buckinghamshire Militia (King's Own), a position that he held for the rest of his life.

In 1804, Temple opposed a bill put forth by William Wilberforce to abolish Britain's involvement in the Atlantic slave trade, claiming it would harm white plantation owners in the British West Indies. In 1806, he was made a Privy Counsellor and appointed Vice-President of the Board of Trade and Joint Paymaster of the Forces in the Ministry of All the Talents headed by his uncle, Lord Grenville. He retained these posts until the fall of the Grenville administration in 1807. He left the House of Commons in 1813 when he succeeded his father in the marquessate.

In 1808 and again in 1810 Temple volunteered the Royal Bucks to serve in the Peninsular War, but the government did not accept these offers. However, in 1813 the English Militia were invited to exchange with Irish Militia regiments on a voluntary basis, and the Royal Bucks did so, serving in Ireland from June 1813. Later in the year, with the war reaching a climax, the government invited the militia to volunteer for limited overseas service, primarily for garrison duties in Europe. Volunteers from the Royal Bucks formed the bulk of the 1st Provisional Battalion, which the Marquess of Buckingham commanded. With two other provisional battalions it formed a Militia Brigade that embarked from Portsmouth Harbour on 10–14 March 1814 and sailed to join the Earl of Dalhousie's division that had occupied Bordeaux just as the war was ending. The brigade did not form part of the Army of Occupation after the abdication of Napoleon and returned to England in June. On leaving France at the end of the deployment, Buckingham and the officers of the Royal Bucks were decorated with the Order of the Fleur de Lys by the restored King Louis XVIII of France.

After Napoleon's final defeat at Waterloo the militia were disembodied and rarely came together for training in the following decades. When the Royal Bucks did train it was usually at the Marquess's park at Stowe House.

In 1820, he was appointed a Knight of the Garter. In 1822, he was further honoured when he was made Earl Temple of Stowe, with remainder to his granddaughter Anne Eliza Mary, and Marquess of Chandos and Duke of Buckingham and Chandos, with normal remainder to heirs male. He returned to ministerial office in July 1830 when he was made Lord Steward of the Household, but only held the post for a short while. Apart from his political career, he was also Lord-Lieutenant of Buckinghamshire from 1813 to 1839.

Buckingham owned three slave plantations in the British colony of Jamaica, one of which was operated with the forced labour of 379 Black slaves. He also owned 10,482 acres (42.42 km^{2}) in Britain, including thirty-eight properties in the Old Nichol. Nicknames such as "Lord Grenville's fat nephew", Ph D (Phat Duke), and the "gros Marquis", attested to his size and unpopularity.

== Later life ==
By 1827 he was critically indebted, but still mustered enough credit to commission a ship with 48 crew and embarked on an extensive and extravagant Grand Tour.

He died in January 1839 and is buried in the family mausoleum at All-Saints Church Wotton Underwood.

== Family ==
In April 1796, aged 20, the then Earl Temple married the Lady Anne Brydges, daughter and sole heir of the late James Brydges, 3rd Duke of Chandos. Accordingly, Nugent-Temple-Grenville added Brydges and Chandos to their family names (and those of their children) by royal licence of 15 November 1799; their full family name became the remarkable quintuple-barrelled Temple-Nugent-Brydges-Chandos-Grenville, which was noted by Guinness World Records as the family name with most number of non-repeated surnames. His wife died in 1836 and he died in January 1839, aged 62, and he was succeeded by his son, Richard.

Parliament of Great Britain
Preceded by James Grenville; Marquess of Titchfield	Member of Parliament for Buckinghamshire; 1797–1800; With: Marquess of Titchfield	Succeeded by Parliament of the United Kingdom
Parliament of the United Kingdom
Preceded by Parliament of Great Britain	Member of Parliament for Buckinghamshire; 1801–1813; With: Marquess of Titchfield, to 1809; William Selby Lowndes 1810–1813	Succeeded by William Selby Lowndes; Thomas Grenville
Political offices
Preceded by George Rose	Vice-President of the Board of Trade; 1806–1807	Succeeded by George Rose
Preceded by George Rose; Lord Charles Somerset	Paymaster of the Forces; 1806–1807; With: Lord John Townshend	Succeeded by Lord Charles Somerset; Charles Long
Preceded by The Marquess Conyngham	Lord Steward; 1830	Succeeded by The Marquess Wellesley
Honorary titles
Preceded by The Marquess of Buckingham	Lord Lieutenant of Buckinghamshire; 1813–1839	Succeeded by The Lord Carrington
Titles of nobility
New creation	Duke of Buckingham and Chandos; 1822–1839	Succeeded by Richard Temple-Nugent-Brydges-Chandos-Grenville
Preceded by George Nugent-Temple-Grenville	Marquess of Buckingham; 1813–1839	Succeeded by Richard Temple-Nugent-Brydges-Chandos-Grenville
New creation	Earl Temple of Stowe; 1822–1839	Succeeded by Richard Temple-Nugent-Brydges-Chandos-Grenville
