= Richard Grenville (1678–1727) =

British politician

Sir Richard Grenville (1678 – 17 February 1727) was a British politician who sat in the House of Commons from 1715 to 1727. Part of the Grenville family that wielded great influence during the eighteenth century his descendants have included three Prime Ministers.

== Early life ==
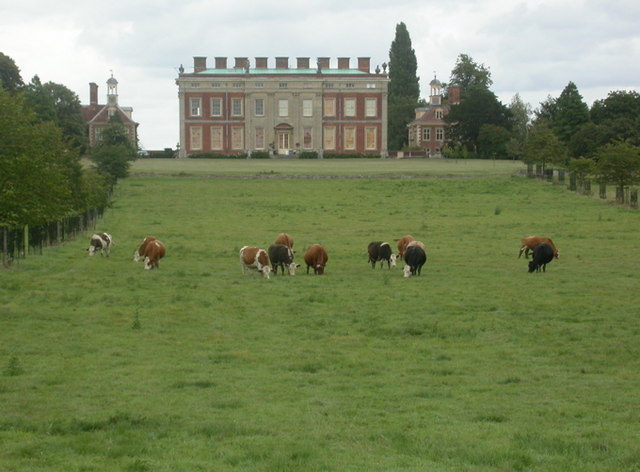
Wotton House in Buckinghamshire, the main residence of the Grenville family during Richard's lifetime. His eldest son later inherited Stowe.

Grenville was the son of Sir Richard Grenville of Wotton in Buckinghamshire and his wife Eleanor Temple, daughter of Sir Peter Temple of Stantonbury, Buckinghamshire and his wife Eleanor Tyrell.

He married his second cousin once removed Hester Temple, the daughter of Sir Richard Temple, 3rd Baronet by a licence of 25 November 1710. Her brother was Richard Temple, 1st Viscount Cobham whose peerage was entailed upon her and her sons. This cemented the close link between the two Buckinghamshire families. After his death Grenville's sons would join the Cobham's Cubs political faction led by his brother-in-law.

== Political career ==
Grenville was proposed as Whig candidate for Buckinghamshire at the 1715 general election but by an agreement with Richard Hampden he was elected Member of Parliament for Wendover instead. At the 1722 general election he was returned unopposed as MP for Buckingham on the interest of Lord Cobham.

== Death and legacy ==
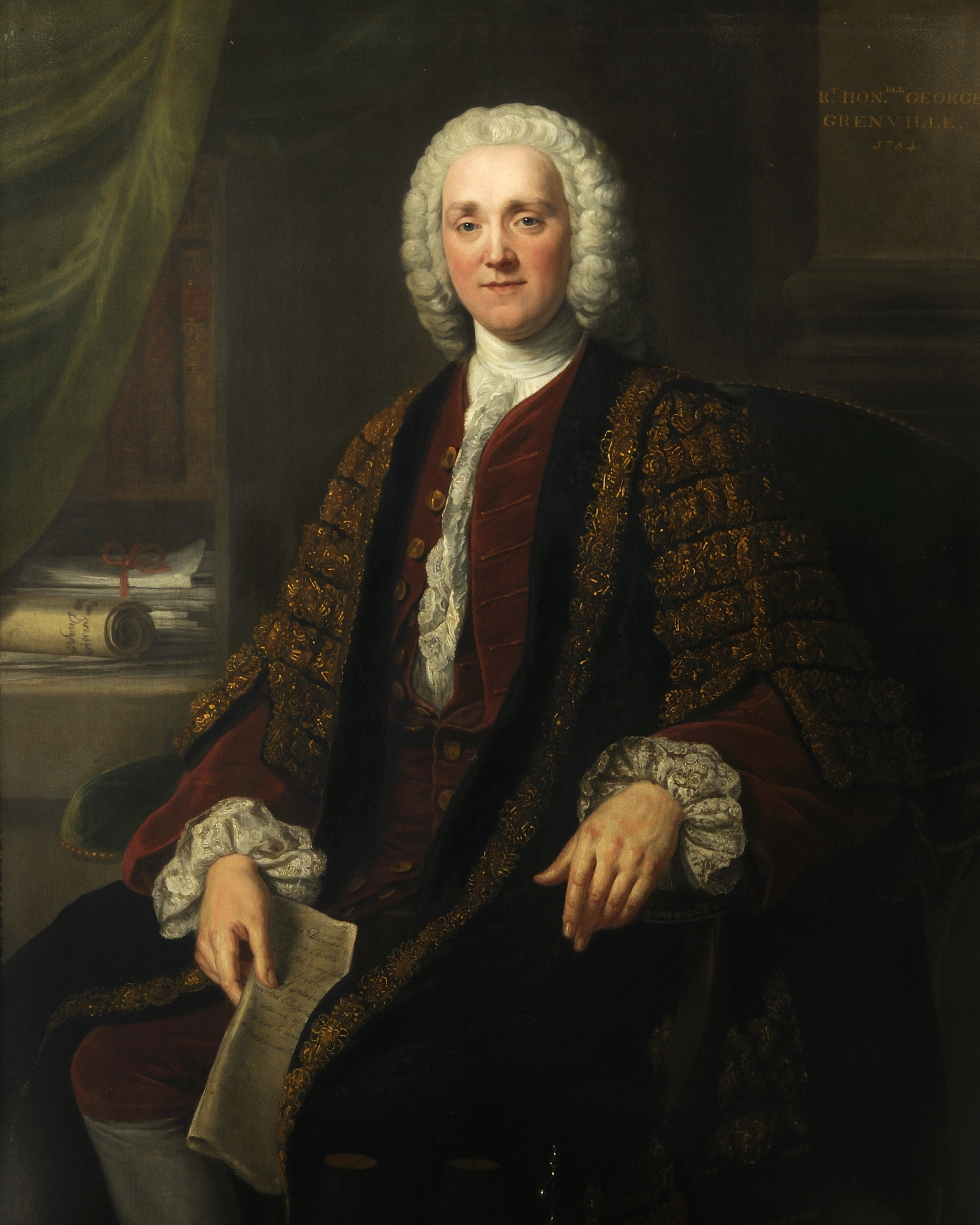
Grenville's son George Grenville served as Prime Minister from 1763 to 1765.

Grenville died on 17 February 1727 in the last year of that parliament and his children were taken care of by his brother-in-law Lord Cobham. He was the father, father-in-law and grandfather of various Prime Ministers of the United Kingdom. Among his male-line descendants were the future Earls Temple and Dukes of Buckingham and Chandos.

His wife Hester inherited the titles of her brother in 1749 and became 1st Countess Temple in her own right. Richard and Hester were the parents of six sons and a daughter. Five sons served in parliament:

- Richard Grenville-Temple, 2nd Earl Temple
- George Grenville, Prime Minister of the UK (1763–65)
- James Grenville, MP
- Henry Grenville, MP and diplomat
- Thomas Grenville, MP and sailor

A daughter, Hester, was the wife of Pitt the elder, also a Prime Minister of the UK. Two of Richard's grandsons, Pitt the younger and William Grenville, also rose to serve as Prime Minister.

== Bibliography ==
- Johnson, Allen S. A prologue to revolution: the political career of George Grenville (1712–1770). University Press of America, 1997.
- Lawson, Phillip. George Grenvile: A Political Life. University of Manchester Press, 1984.

Parliament of Great Britain
Preceded by James Stanhope; Sir Roger Hill	Member of Parliament for Wendover; 1715–1722; With: Sir Roger Hill	Succeeded by Richard Hampden; Sir Richard Steele
Preceded by Alexander Denton; Edmund Halsey	Member of Parliament for Buckingham; 1722–1727; With: Alexander Denton 1722; William Heathcote 1722–1727	Succeeded by William Heathcote; John Fane
