= Penelope Lyttelton, Viscountess Cobham =

British businesswoman (born 1954)

Penelope, Viscountess Cobham CBE
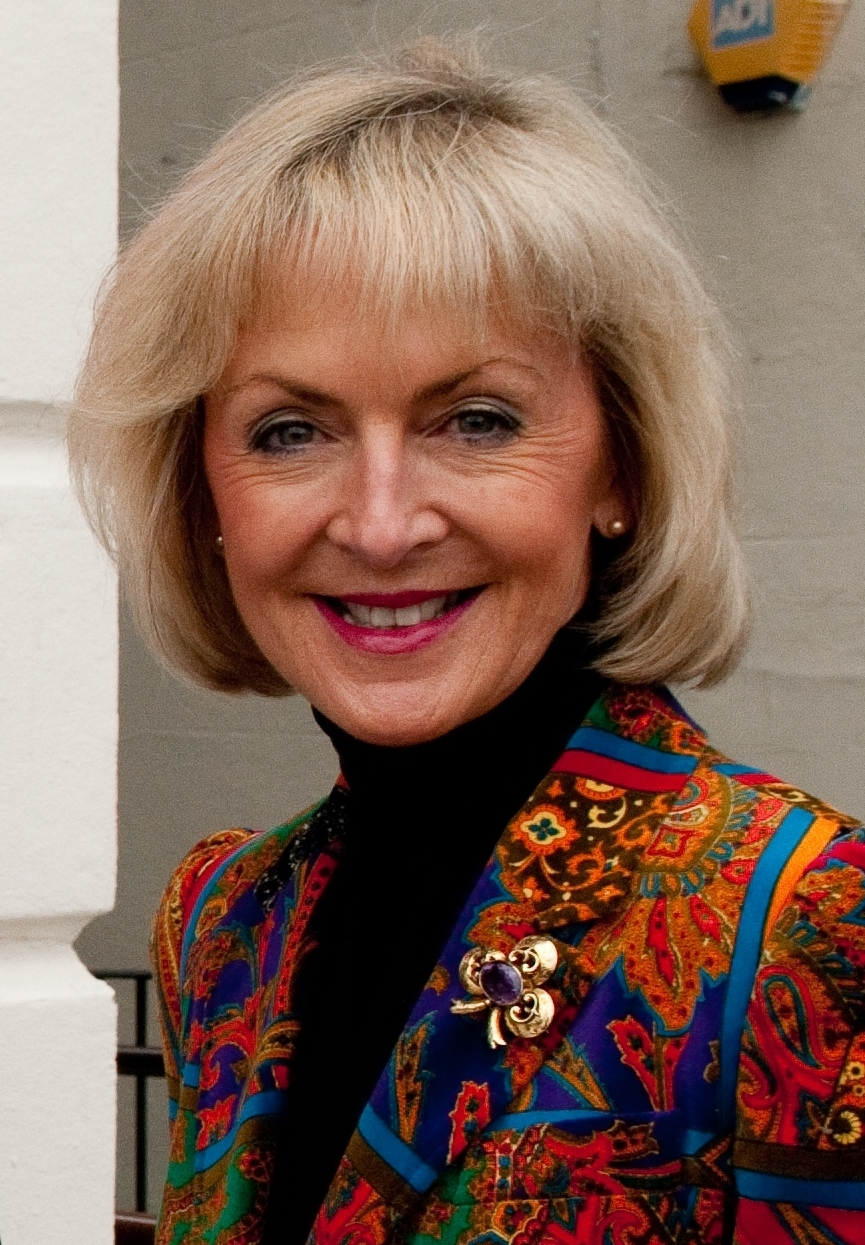
- Cobham in 2012
- Born: Penelope Ann Cooper; 2 January 1954 (age 72)
- Spouse: John Lyttelton, 11th Viscount Cobham (m. 1974; div. 1995)
- Partner: David Mellor
- Cobham's voice recorded 2012, as part of an audio description of Wimbledon for VocalEyes

Penelope Ann Lyttelton, Viscountess Cobham, CBE (née Cooper; born 2 January 1954), is a British businesswoman known for her involvement in a number of quangos (quasi-autonomous non-governmental organisations).

== Personal life ==
Penelope Ann Cooper was educated at St James's School, West Malvern. In 1974, she married John Lyttelton, son of Charles Lyttelton, 10th Viscount Cobham, and heir apparent to the Viscountcy of Cobham. Three years later, upon the death of her father-in-law, the couple became Viscount and Viscountess Cobham. Along with the title came the two-century-old Hagley Hall, a mansion in Worcestershire. Lady Cobham opened the hall to the public and developed it as a venue for conferences.

=== Divorce ===
Cobham became a special adviser to the heritage minister David Mellor in the newly created Department of National Heritage in 1992. In 1994, both Cobham and Mellor made public announcements describing that they had developed a close relationship with one another and intended to divorce their existing spouses. The Cobhams divorced in 1995. Viscountess Cobham and Mellor live in London.

== Career ==
Cobham has been referred to as the "Quango Queen" because of the number of trusteeships and directorships she has held in the arts and tourism.

During her marriage, to make enough money to maintain and conserve Hagley Hall, Cobham developed a corporate entertainment and catering business. Prior to becoming special adviser on tourism and heritage in 1992, she was on the boards of English Tourist Board, English Heritage, the Countryside Commission and Historic Royal Palaces. Cobham was later on the boards of the Victoria and Albert Museum, British Waterways, and London Docklands Development Corporation. For 14 years, Cobham chaired Britain's largest radio station outside London, Heart West Midlands.

From 2000 until 2009, she chaired the British Casino Association; the Gambling Act 2005 was passed during this time. In that role, she successfully campaigned for the liberalisation of the 35-year-old gambling laws and raised £2.5 million from casino companies for the benefit of addiction and research charities, warning the casinos reluctant to donate that the government might introduce a permanent levy.

Between 2005 and 2009, Cobham was deputy chairman of VisitBritain. In April 2009, she became chairman of VisitEngland. Having been reappointed by the minister Hugh Robertson in April 2013, she served until April 2017. She was deputy chairman of Pagefield Communications, an adviser to Citi Private Bank, Farrer & Co, Ernst & Young, and on the council for the National Trust.

She has been Director General of the 5% Club, chairman of the Museum Prize Trust, and a board member of the Historic Houses Association, the Shakespeare Birthplace Trust and Urban Legacies.

She was appointed Commander of the Order of the British Empire in the 2014 Birthday Honours for services to tourism.
