= Lisa Clayton =

British yachtswoman

The Right Honourable The Dowager Viscountess Cobham
- Born: 30 December 1958 (age 67)
- Education: Church of England School for Girls, Edgbaston; University of Birmingham
- Occupations: sailor and aristocrat
- Known for: First British woman to sail single-handed and non-stop around the world
- Spouse(s): John Lyttelton, 11th Viscount Cobham (m. 1997, died 2006)

Lisa Lyttelton, Dowager Viscountess Cobham (née Clayton, born 30 December 1958) is an English sailor and aristocrat. She was the first British woman and woman from the Northern hemisphere to sail single-handed and non-stop around the world. She later married John Lyttelton, 11th Viscount Cobham.

== Early life ==
Clayton was born on 30 December 1958. She was educated in Birmingham at the Church of England School for Girls, Edgbaston, then studied at University of Birmingham. She worked as a travel consultant in Edgbaston.

== Sailing record ==
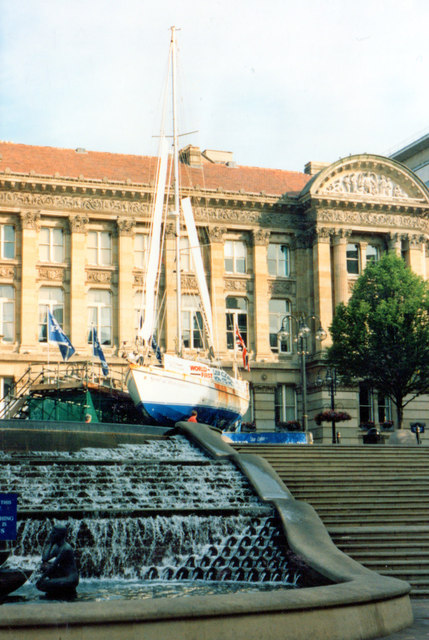
Spirit of Birmingham outside Birmingham Council House in 1995

On 17 September 1994, Clayton set out from Dartmouth in Devon to attempt two world records, namely "Fastest Sail Around the World by a Woman, Single-Handed Without Assistance" and "First British Woman to Sail Single-Handed and Non-Stop Around the World."

On her vessel, Clayton survived the 31,000-mile (50,000 km) journey despite enduring 60-70 mph winds, capsizing twice in the Southern Ocean and needing to make repairs en route. Clayton's electricity generator's round bearings broke in a storm, so she replaced them with pearls from her necklace. Also during her journey, she sent more than 4,000 satellite faxes to her business manager, Peter Harding, containing pin-point locations to prove where her boat was at any one time. She returned to Dartmouth on 29 June 1995, after 285 days at sea.

Her thirty-eight foot yacht was called Spirit of Birmingham, and was named after her home city and the university which contributed over £40,000 and expertise to make it possible for Clayton to realise her dream. The International Yacht Racing Union and the World Record Speed Sailing Council ratified her achievement and that Clayton had circumnavigated the globe according to the rules. She also became the first women from the northern hemisphere to sail solo around the world.

On 29 June 1995, a congratulatory motion was tabled in Parliament by Labour Party MPs. On 1 October 1996, Clayton was recognised as an Honorary Freeman of the City of Birmingham. Clayton also published At the Mercy of the Sea in 1996 to document her journey.

== Personal life ==
On 1 August 1997. Clayton married John Lyttelton, 11th Viscount Cobham, the owner of Hagley Hall in Worcestershire. He died in 2006.
