= SGSE =

SGSE may refer to:

- Senior General Secondary Education (SGSE), in Dutch: the Hoger algemeen voortgezet onderwijs (HAVO), in the Kingdom of the Netherlands
- Spectral Gene Set Enrichment (SGSE), a proposed unsupervised test alternative to gene set enrichment analysis (GSEA)
- St George's School Edgbaston, a non-selective private day school in Edgbaston, Birmingham, England, in the United Kingdom
