= Christopher Lyttelton, 12th Viscount Cobham =

British nobleman and peer

The Right Honourable The Viscount Cobham
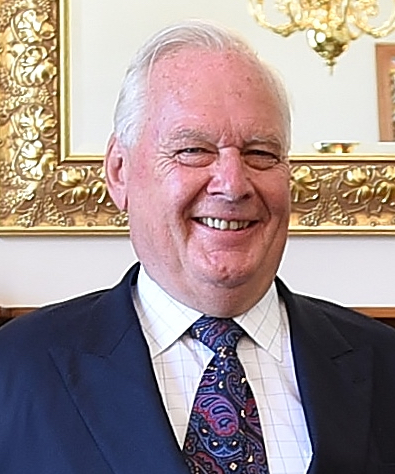
- Predecessor: John Lyttelton, 11th Viscount Cobham
- Other titles: 11th Baron Cobham; 14th Baronet Lyttelton; 8th Lord Lyttelton; 8th Baron Westcote of Ballymore
- Born: Christopher Charles Lyttelton; 23 October 1947 (age 79)
- Residence: Hagley Hall, Worcestershire (family seat); London
- Spouse: Teresa Readman (m. 1973)
- Issue: Hon. Oliver Christopher Lyttelton; Hon. Sophie Emma Lyttelton
- Heir: Hon. Oliver Lyttelton
- Parents: Charles Lyttelton, 10th Viscount Cobham; Elizabeth Alison Makeig-Jones

Christopher Charles Lyttelton, 12th Viscount Cobham (born 23 October 1947) is a British nobleman and peer from the Lyttelton family in the United Kingdom.

== Biography ==
The second son of the 10th Viscount Cobham, Lyttelton inherited the title on 13 July 2006 on the death of his elder brother, John Lyttelton, 11th Viscount Cobham, who had no children. He also inherited the family seat Hagley Hall, near Stourbridge in Worcestershire, which was in disrepair. His predecessor, the 11th Viscount, had managed to ease some of the debt by selling off land surrounding the house but the estate still faced mounting debts. He initiated restoration and conservation works around the dilapidated areas of the main house and the redevelopment of the park surrounding the house in cooperation with English Heritage and Natural England. Lord Cobham and his wife live in part of the main house while the rest is open to the public and available for hire as a weddings and events venue.

He was educated at Eton, where his father had been before him.

As of 2008, Lord Cobham was working as a financial consultant at the accountancy firm Smith & Williamson in London. He enjoys flying gliders.

== Marriage and issue ==
He married Teresa Mary (Tessa) Readman, daughter of Colonel Alexander George Jeremy Readman and Mary Kay Curtis, in 1973. They have two children:

- Hon Oliver Christopher Lyttelton (born 24 February 1976), heir apparent.
- Hon Sophie Emma Lyttelton (born 9 April 1978); married with children.

The 6th Duke of Westminster was Lyttelton's first cousin.

Peerage of Great Britain
Preceded by John Lyttelton	Viscount Cobham; 2006–present	Incumbent; Heir apparent: Hon. Oliver Christopher Lyttelton
