= John Lyttelton, 11th Viscount Cobham =

British nobleman and peer

The Viscount Cobham
- Predecessor: Charles Lyttelton, 10th Viscount Cobham
- Successor: Christopher Charles Lyttelton, 12th Viscount Cobham
- Other titles: 11th Baron Cobham; 14th Baronet Lyttelton; 8th Lord Lyttelton; 8th Baron Westcote of Ballymore
- Born: John William Leonard Lyttelton; 15 June 1943
- Died: 13 July 2006 (aged 63); Spain
- Spouses: Penelope Cooper (m. 1974; div. 1995) Lisa Clayton (m. 1997)
- Issue: None
- Parents: Charles Lyttelton, 10th Viscount Cobham; Elizabeth Alison Makeig-Jones

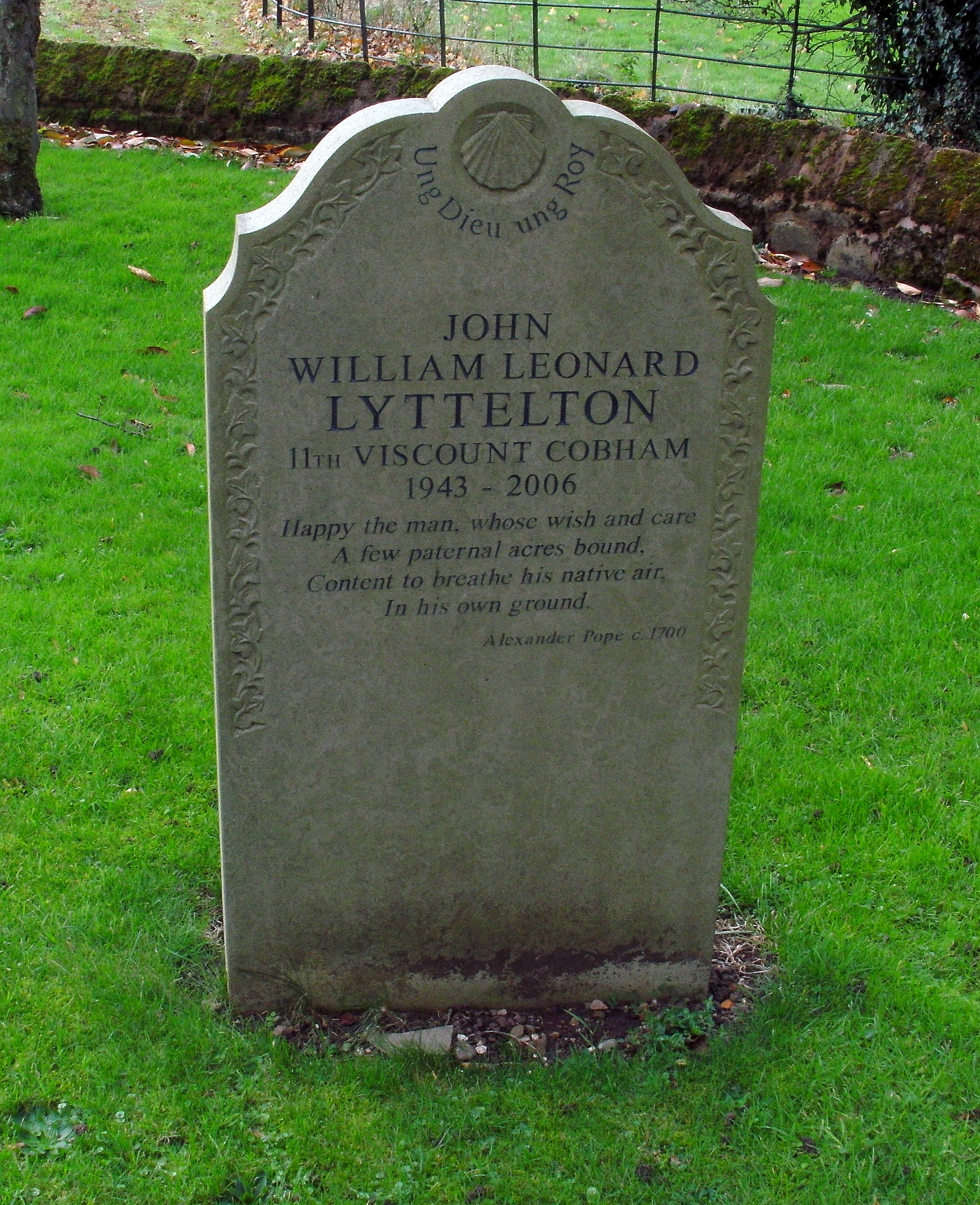
St John the Baptist Church, Hagley, grave of John Lyttelton, 11th Viscount Cobham

John William Leonard Lyttelton, 11th Viscount Cobham (15 June 1943 – 13 July 2006) was a British nobleman and peer from the Lyttelton family. He was known as "Johnny Lyttelton" to his friends and family.

He was educated at Eton, where his father had been before him, and at Christ's College, Christchurch while his father was Governor-General of New Zealand. He later attended the Royal Agricultural College in Cirencester.

He married Penelope Ann Cooper in 1974, and inherited the family's titles and 200-year-old Worcestershire mansion, Hagley Hall, on his father's death in 1977. Facing inheritance taxes and high maintenance costs as well as the unstable state of finances left by his predecessors, he auctioned his family's 700-year archive for £164,000, and sold Necker Island to Richard Branson for $120,000. (Note: Some sources claim Branson purchased the island for $180,000) The hall was converted into a conference venue, although it also remained the family home.

He was a member of the Conservative Party, but shyness prevented him from taking the seat in the House of Lords to which, initially, his hereditary peerage entitled him. He left the Conservatives in 1992, in protest at Michael Heseltine's announcement that many coal mines would be closed. His first wife, Penelope, was a special adviser to David Mellor while he was Secretary of State for Culture, Media and Sport in 1992. Lady Cobham was later to leave her husband for Mellor. She and the 11th Viscount were divorced on 30 August 1995, and Viscount Cobham had to sell family heirlooms to pay a £1 million divorce settlement. He later confessed to having contemplated suicide over the break-up, while sitting in his drawing room holding a loaded shotgun.

Lord Cobham remarried on 1 August 1997 to Lisa Clayton, the first British woman to have sailed single-handed and non-stop around the world.

He opposed the introduction of the ban on fox hunting, and said he would rather go to prison than prevent hunting on his estate.

Lord Cobham died in Spain at the age of 63. His ashes were returned to Hagley for burial in the Lyttelton plot at Hagley parish church. He had no children from either marriage. His titles were inherited by his younger brother, Christopher, 12th Viscount Cobham.

Peerage of Great Britain
Preceded by Charles Lyttelton	Viscount Cobham; 1977–2006	Succeeded by Christopher Lyttelton
