= The 5% Club =

UK movement of employers

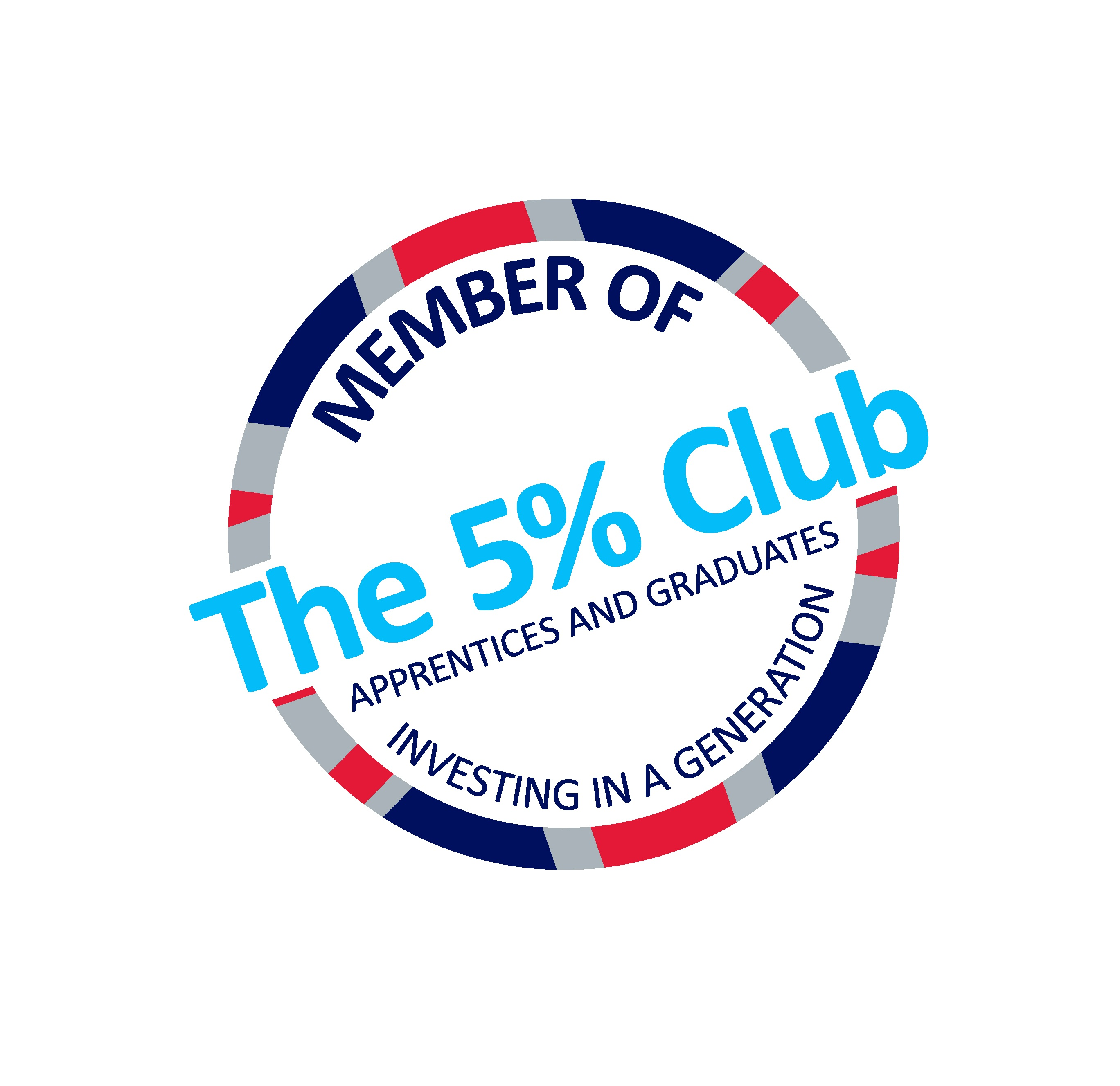
- Type: Non-profit organization
- Founded: 2013
- Headquarters: London
- Key people: Leo Quinn (founder)
- Website: www.5percentclub.org.uk

The 5% Club is a United Kingdom charity that encourages companies to employ workers in "earn and learn" entry roles.

== History ==
The 5% Club was founded by business executive Leo Quinn in 2013. The organization's stated purpose is to address the youth unemployment and skills shortage in the United Kingdom by encouraging skills development. Its executive team works with the private sector and public sector, with Members of Parliament describing it as the 'gold standard' for businesses supporting skill development. The Confederation of British Industry (CBI) has also endorsed The 5% Club and upon its launch, publicly urged British industry to strive to commit to the 5% employment target.

In 2018, The 5% Club gained charitable status.

== Membership ==
As of 2026, the organization has more than 1,300 member companies. Members pledge to have at least 5% of their employees in earn and learn roles within 5-years of joining, and are required to publish an annual report on their progress.
