= Lyttelton family =

British aristocratic family

Ancestral arms of the Lyttelton/Littleton family as used by the Viscounts Cobham: Argent, a chevron between three escallops sable

Arms of the Viscounts Chandos from the Lyttelton family, incorporating a cross moline as mark of cadency.

The Lyttelton family (sometimes spelled Littleton) is a British aristocratic family. Over time, several members of the Lyttelton family were made knights, baronets and peers. Hereditary titles held by the Lyttelton family include the viscountcies of Cobham (since 1889) and Chandos (since 1954), as well as the Lyttelton barony (since 1794) and Lyttelton baronetcy (since 1618). Several other members of the family have also risen to prominence, particularly in the field of cricket.

== History ==
=== Branches of the Littleton/Lyttelton family ===
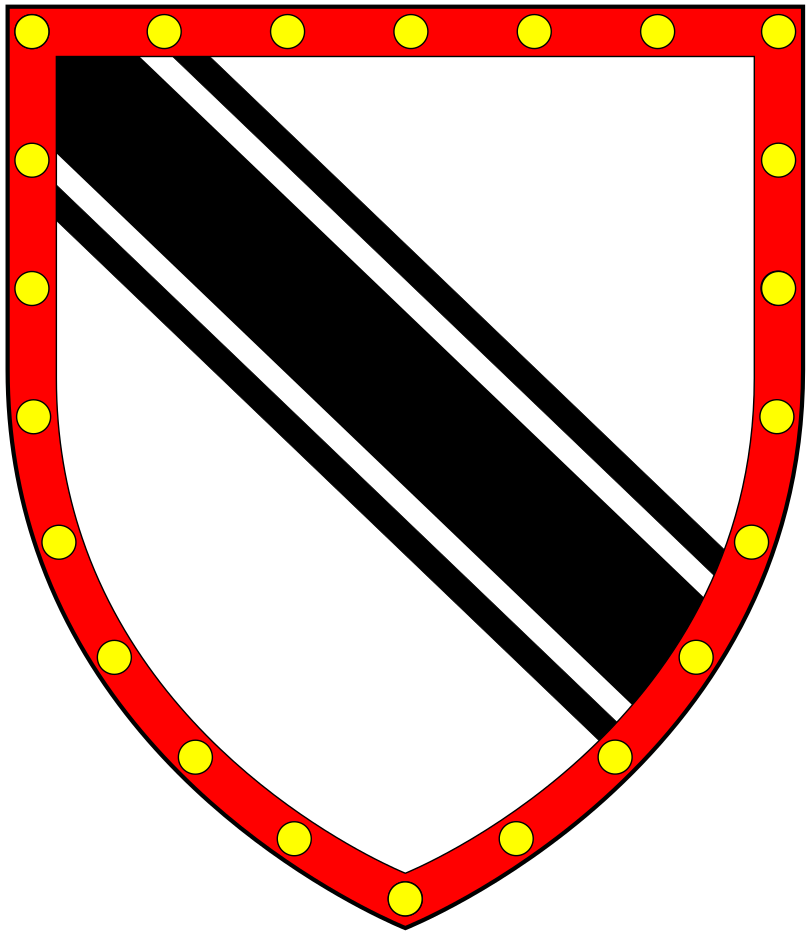
Arms of Westcott: Argent, a bend cotised sable a bordure gules bezantée, (sometimes shown with a bordure engrailed bezantee), as seen quartered by Lyttleton on the monument of George Lyttelton (1528–1600) of Frankley, in the Church of St John the Baptist, Bromsgrove

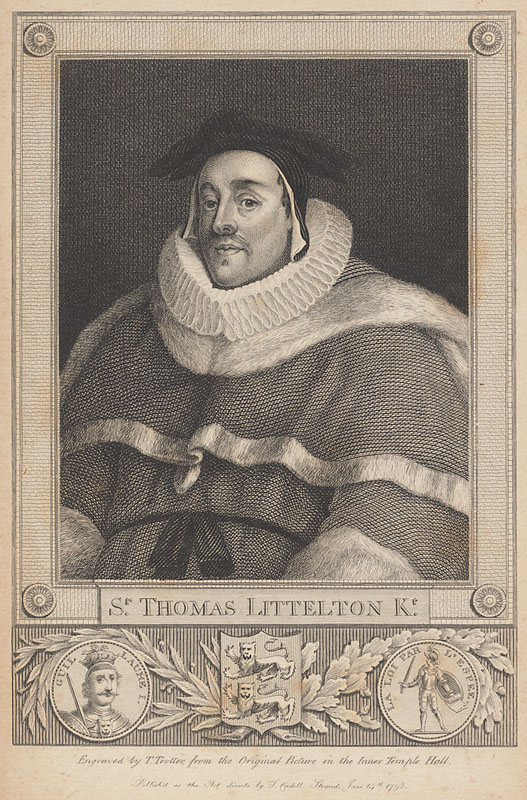
Sir Thomas Littleton (c. 1407–1481), the distinguished judge and writer, ancestor of three branches of the family. Anachronistically costumed.

The Lyttleton pedigree is set out in the Heraldic Visitation of Worcestershire. The Littleton/Lyttelton family had its origins at the manor of South Lyttleton, near Evesham, in Worcestershire. On the death of Thomas de Littleton, lord of the manor of Frankley in Worcestershire (inherited on the marriage of his great-grandfather Thomas Littleton to Emma de Frankley, daughter and heiress of Simon de Frankley), the last in the male line, his sole heiress became his only daughter Elizabeth Littleton, who married Thomas Westcott/Westcote, Esquire, "the king's servant in court", who served as Escheator of Worcestershire in 1450.

Of her four sons, the eldest, Thomas (later the distinguished judge), took his maternal surname and arms of Lyttleton (or Littleton), whilst the others Guy (2nd son), Edmund (3rd son) and Nicholas (4th son), retained their paternal surname and arms of Westcott.

Edmund Westcote died unmarried, whilst his brother Nicholas Westcote married Agnes Vernon, the daughter and heiress of Edmund Vernon, and was ancestor of the Westcotes of Staffordshire; Guy Westcote married a daughter of the Greenevile family of Gloucestershire, and was ancestor of the Westcotes of Raddon in the parish of Shobrooke in Devon (among whom was his great-grandson the antiquary Thomas Westcote of Raddon) and of Somerset.

Sir Thomas Littleton (c. 1407–1481), became a distinguished judge and legal writer, referred to as "one of the great law luminaries of his country", and is immortalized by one work alone, his celebrated Treatise on Tenures. He was appointed a judge of the Court of Common Pleas in 1464, and inherited the Frankley estates from his mother. He was survived by three sons, William, Richard and Thomas, from whom originated three lines of Littleton/Lyttelton landed gentry in the West Midlands, all of which acquired baronetcies in the 17th century:

- Thomas Littleton, the third son, is recorded as Thomas Litleton of Speechly and incumbent of Spetchley, Worcestershire. His descendant Adam Littleton received the Littleton Baronetcy, of Stoke Milburgh, in 1642.

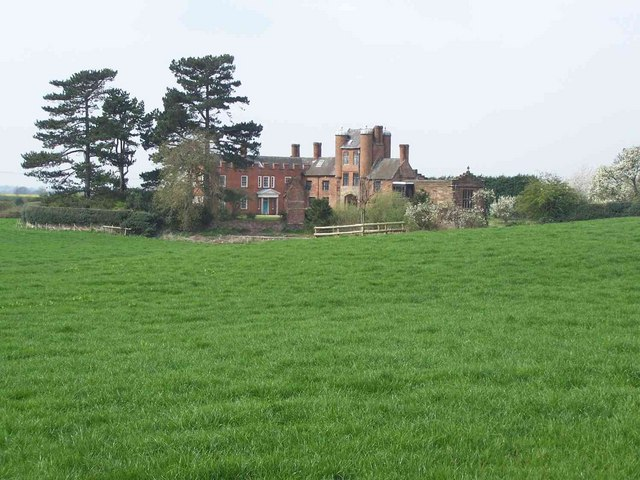
Remains of Pillaton Old Hall. The original moated manor house became ruinous, but the Gatehouse and Chapel were restored in the 1880s.

- Richard Littleton, the second son, married the heiress of Pillaton Hall in Staffordshire. His descendant Edward Littleton received the Littleton Baronetcy, of Pillaton Hall, in 1627. The title became extinct in 1812 on the death of the 4th Baronet. The lands then passed to a nephew, Edward John Walhouse, who adopted the surname of Littleton and was created Baron Hatherton in 1835.

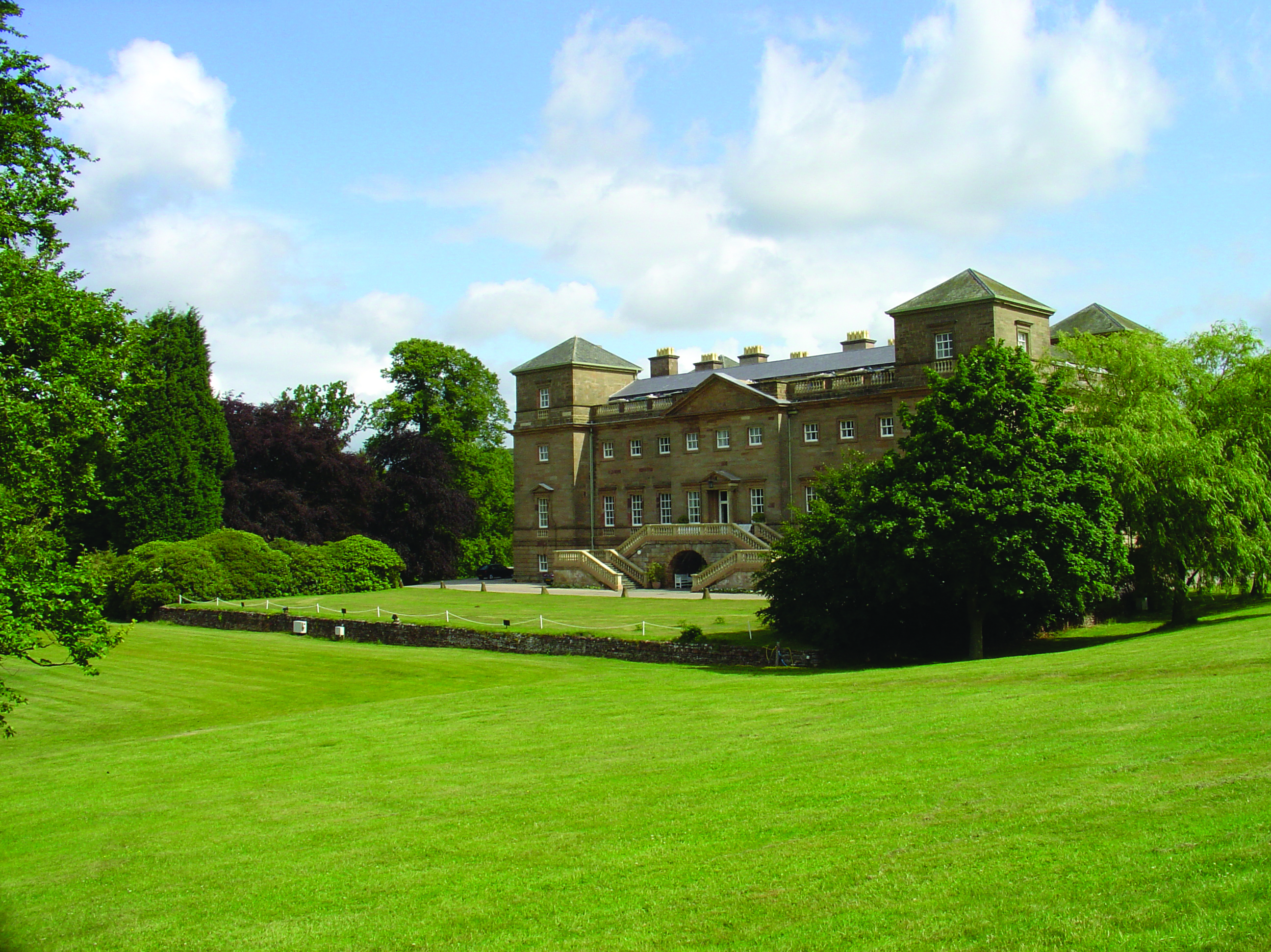
Hagley Hall, rebuilt between 1754 and 1760 in Neo-Palladian style. Most owners of Hagley Hall are buried at the adjacent parish church of St John the Baptist.

- William Littleton (1450–1507), the eldest son, inherited the lands at Frankley, and was knighted after the Battle of Stoke (1487), one of the last major engagements of the Wars of the Roses. He was succeeded by his son John Littleton (c. 1500–1533), who was succeeded by his son John Lyttelton (1520–1590). He was made constable of Dudley Castle and keeper of the old and new parks there in 1553. In 1565 he bought the manor of Hagley from John St. Leger. Together with Frankley and Upper Arley, which he inherited, this formed the core of the Lyttelton family estate. He was knighted by Elizabeth I at Kenilworth in 1566. He was succeeded by his son Gilbert (c.1570–1599), the High Sheriff of Worcestershire in 1584, who was the father of John († 1601) and Humphrey († 1606). Humphrey was executed for his part in the Gunpowder Plot. John Lyttelton served as a Member of Parliament but was concerned in the rebellion of Robert Devereux, 2nd Earl of Essex in 1601. He was tried for high treason, but was reprieved from execution. His estates in Frankley, Halesowen, Hagley and Upper Arley were forfeited to the Crown, but were restored to his widow Meriel (daughter of Sir Thomas Bromley, Lord Chancellor of England) on the accession of James I. She survived him 28 years and cleared the estates of debt, bringing up her children as Anglicans. The eldest son, Thomas Lyttelton (1593–1650) received the Lyttelton Baronetcy, of Frankley in the County of Worcester, in the Baronetage of England, in 1618.

=== The Lytteltons of Frankley and Hagley ===
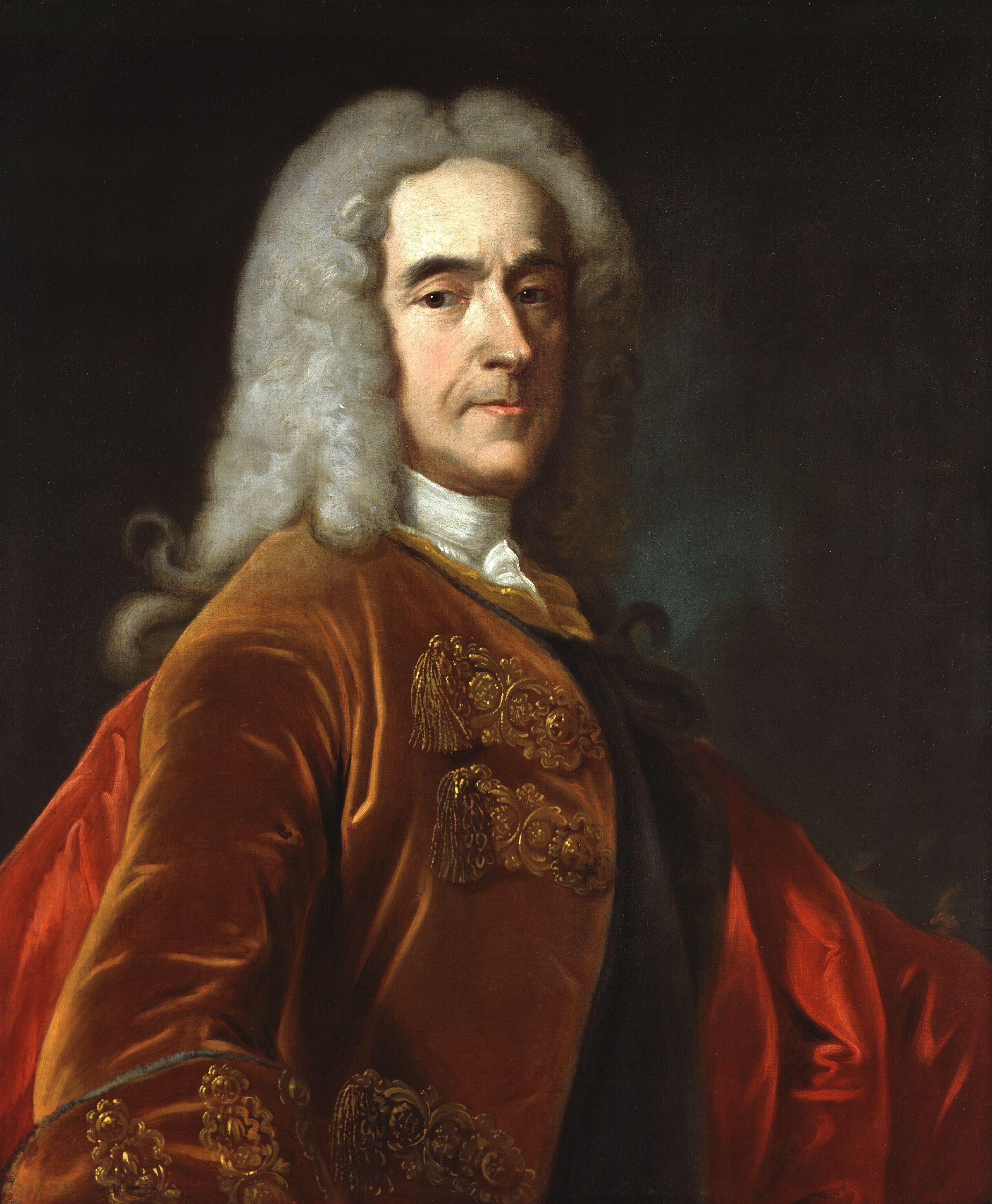
Field Marshal Richard Temple, 1st Baron and 1st Viscount Cobham (1675–1749)

Sir Thomas Lyttelton, 1st Baronet of Frankley (1593–1650), devoted much time to developing his estates in Frankley, Halesowen, Hagley and Upper Arley, and later represented Worcestershire in the House of Commons. His son, the 2nd Baronet, sat as Member of Parliament for Lichfield. He was succeeded by his younger brother, the 3rd Baronet, who represented Bewdley in Parliament. He was succeeded by his son, the 4th Baronet. He was Member of Parliament for Worcester and Camelford.

In 1708, the 4th Baronet married Christian Temple, daughter of Sir Richard Temple, 3rd Baronet of Stowe. In 1718, her brother was created Baron Cobham, of Cobham in the County of Kent, and Viscount Cobham, with special remainder (in default of his own heirs male) to his sister Christian and her heirs male and in default of them to the heirs male of Christian. This latter remainder took effect in 1889 when her descendant Charles Lyttelton, 5th Baron Lyttelton succeeded as 8th Viscount Cobham.

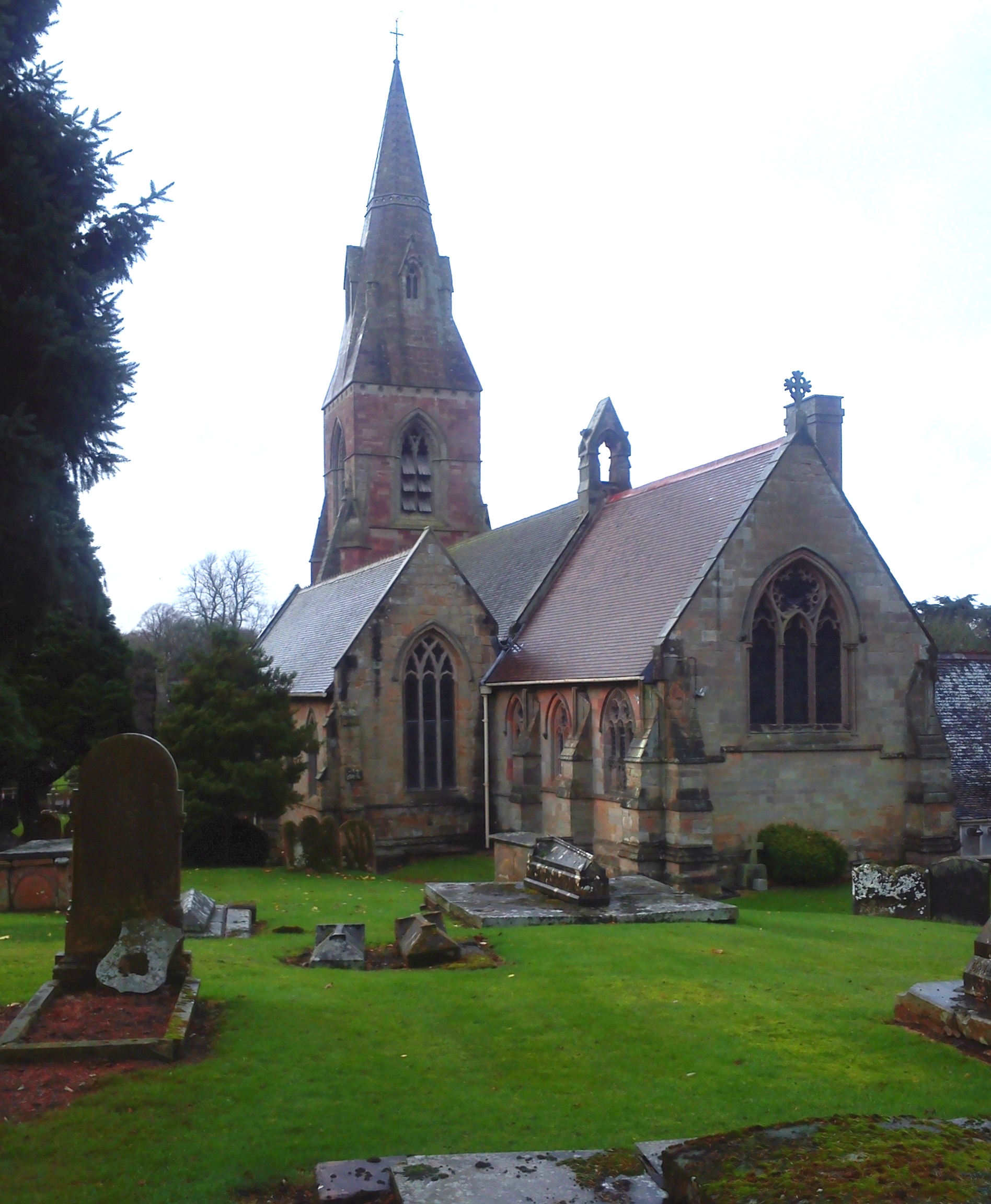
St John the Baptist Church, Hagley

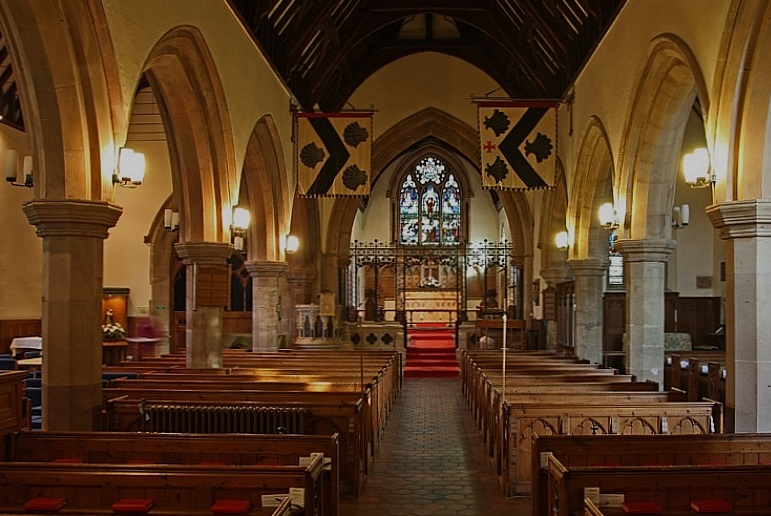
Interior of St John the Baptist Church, Hagley, with the Garter banners of the 1st Viscount Chandos and the 10th Viscount Cobham

In 1751, the 4th Baronet was succeeded by his eldest son, the 5th Baronet, who was a prominent politician. In 1755 he was created Baron Lyttelton, of Frankley in the County of Worcester, in the Peerage of Great Britain. He was succeeded in his titles by his son, the 2nd Baron, who briefly represented Bewdley in the House of Commons.

The 2nd Baron had no legitimate issue and on his death in 1779, the Lyttelton barony (created in 1755) became extinct. However, he was succeeded in the Lyttelton baronetcy (created in 1618) by his uncle, the 7th Baronet. He also represented Bewdley in Parliament and served as Governor of South Carolina and of Jamaica. In 1776, three years before he succeeded in the baronetcy, he was created Baron Westcote, of Balamere in the County of Longford, in the Peerage of Ireland. In 1794 he was further created Baron Lyttelton, of Frankley in the County of Worcester, in the Peerage of Great Britain. His eldest son, who later succeeded as the 2nd Baron, also sat as Member of Parliament for Bewdley. His half-brother, the 3rd Baron, represented Worcestershire in the House of Commons and also served as Lord Lieutenant of Worcestershire. His son, the 4th Baron, was briefly Under-Secretary of State for War and the Colonies in 1846 under Sir Robert Peel and also served as Lord Lieutenant of Worcestershire. Upon his death, he was succeeded by his son, the 5th Baron, who had previously represented East Worcestershire in Parliament as a Liberal.

In 1889 he also succeeded his distant relative, the late 3rd Duke of Buckingham and Chandos, as 8th Viscount Cobham. His son, the 9th Viscount Cobham, was Lord Lieutenant of Worcestershire from 1923 to 1949. He was succeeded by his son, the 10th Viscount. He served as Governor-General of New Zealand from 1957 to 1962 and was made a Knight of the Garter in 1964 and also served as Chancellor of the Order of the Garter. His nephew, Oliver Lyttelton, was made Viscount Chandos, of Aldershot in the County of Southampton, in the Peerage of the United Kingdom in 1954 and a Knight of the Garter in 1970. The 3rd Viscount Chandos was given a life peerage as Baron Lyttelton of Aldershot, of Aldershot in the County of Hampshire, in 2000.

Lyttleton Family in America

Nathanial Littleton the son of Sir Edward Littleton of Henley is stated in a family pedigree book once in possession of Lord Hatherton as "Nathanial emigrated to Virginia in 1635, a gentleman of the Earl of Southampton's Company in 1625." Nathanial married Ann Southey in Virginia and they had two sons named Southey and Edward as well as one daughter named Esther who married a man named Colonel John Robins. Nathanial died around September 4, 1654. Nathanial still has numerous descendants living in the United States today.

According to the book Second Edition of Royal Descents of 900 Immigrants by professional genealogist Gary Boyd Roberts, Mary (Underhill) Stites was the daughter of Humphrey Underhill and Maragret Hall. Mary was a descendant of Sir Thomas Littleton's granddaughter Anne through his son Richard Littleton. Anne married Thomas Middlemore of Edgbaston. Mary immigrated to Hempstead, New York from England and married Richard Stites. One of Mary's notable descendants is First Lady Jill Biden the wife of U.S. President Joe Biden.

== Members of the family ==
=== Frankley/Hagley branch ===
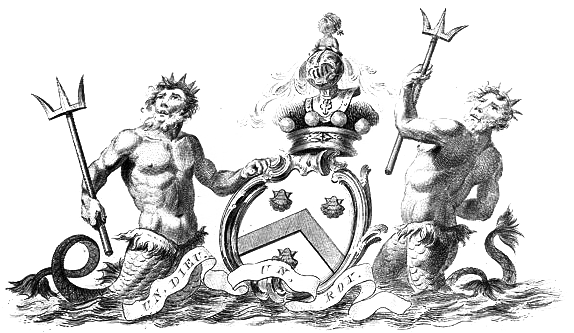
The coat of arms of the Barons Lyttelton (second creation).

==== Early members ====
- Sir William Littleton (1450–1507), of Frankley, eldest son of Sir Thomas Littleton (c. 1407–1481), justice and author. He succeeded to his father's estates and was knighted after the Battle of Stoke. Sir William Littleton was succeeded by his son:
- John Littleton (c. 1500–1533), who was succeeded by his son:
- Sir John Lyttelton (1520–1590), who was succeeded by his son:
- Gilbert Lyttelton (c.1540–1599), who was the father of John († 1601) and Humphrey († 1606)
- John Lyttelton (MP) (1561–1601), who was succeeded by his son:
- Thomas Lyttelton (1593–1650, who was made a Baronet in 1618)

==== Baronets (1618) ====
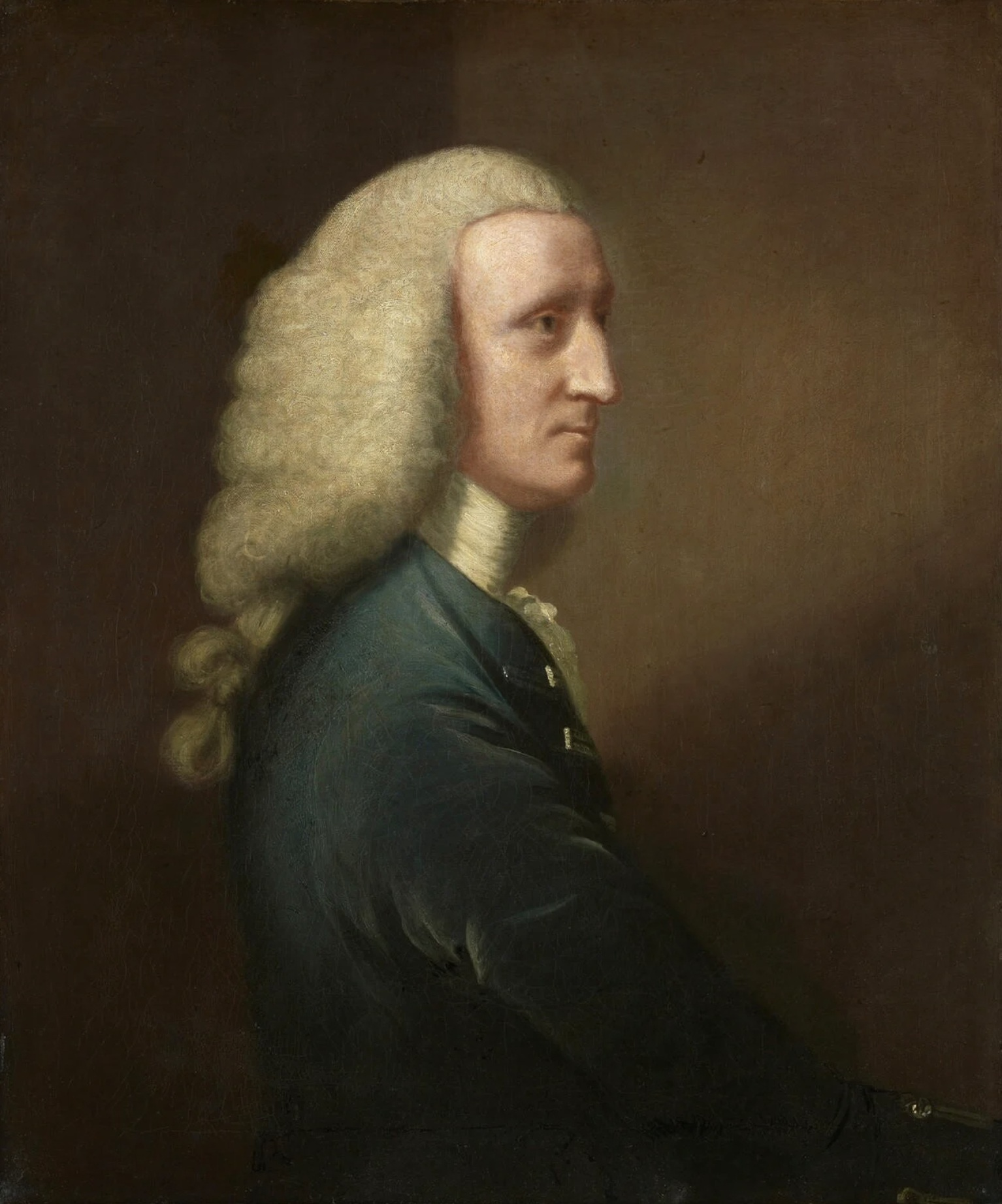
George Lyttelton, 1st Baron Lyttelton (1709–1773)

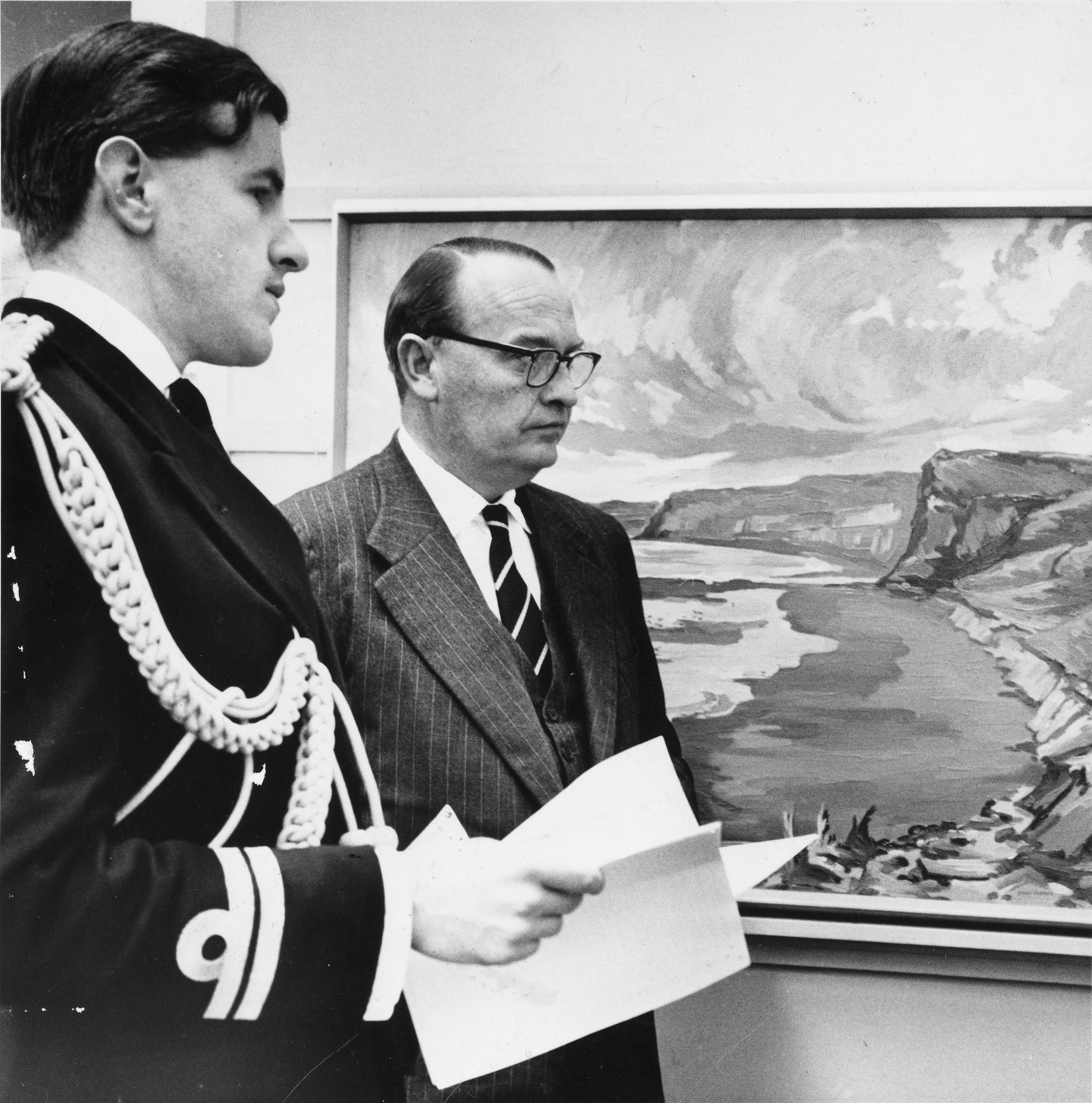
Charles Lyttelton, 10th Viscount Cobham (1909–1977) in 1958 with Neil Durden-Smith

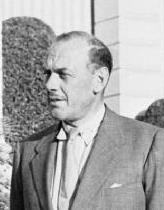
Oliver Lyttelton, 1st Viscount Chandos (1893–1972)

- Sir Thomas Lyttelton, 1st Baronet (1593–1650)
- Sir Henry Lyttelton, 2nd Baronet (1624–1693)
- Sir Charles Lyttelton, 3rd Baronet (1628–1716)
- Sir Thomas Lyttelton, 4th Baronet (1686–1751)
- Sir George Lyttelton, 5th Baronet (1709–1773, created Baron Lyttelton in 1756)

==== Barons Lyttelton (1756) ====
- George Lyttelton, 5th Baronet, 1st Baron Lyttelton (1709–1773)
- Thomas Lyttelton, 6th Baronet, 2nd Baron Lyttelton (1744–1779)

==== Barons Westcote (1776) ====
- William Henry Lyttelton, 7th Baronet (1724–1808, created Baron Westcote in 1776 and Baron Lyttelton in 1794)

==== Barons Lyttelton (1794) ====
- William Henry Lyttelton, 7th Baronet, 1st Baron Westcote, 1st Baron Lyttelton (1724–1808)
- George Lyttelton, 2nd Baron Lyttelton (1763–1828)
- William Lyttelton, 3rd Baron Lyttelton (1782–1837)
- George Lyttelton, 4th Baron Lyttelton (1817–1876)
- Charles Lyttelton, 5th Baron Lyttelton (1842–1922, succeeded as 8th Viscount Cobham in 1889)

==== Viscounts Cobham (1718) ====
- Charles Lyttelton, 5th Baron Lyttelton, 8th Viscount Cobham (1842–1922)
- John Lyttelton, 9th Viscount Cobham (1881–1949)
- Charles Lyttelton, 10th Viscount Cobham (1909–1977)
- John Lyttelton, 11th Viscount Cobham (1943–2006)
- Christopher Charles Lyttelton, 12th Viscount Cobham (b. 1947)

The heir apparent is the present holder's son Hon. Oliver Christopher Lyttelton (b. 1976).

==== Viscounts Chandos (1954) ====
- Oliver Lyttelton, 1st Viscount Chandos (1893–1972), after whom the Lyttelton Theatre is named
- Antony Lyttelton, 2nd Viscount Chandos (1920–1980)
- Thomas Lyttelton, 3rd Viscount Chandos (b. 1953)

The heir apparent is the present holder's son Hon. Oliver Antony Lyttelton (b. 1986).

==== Other notable members ====
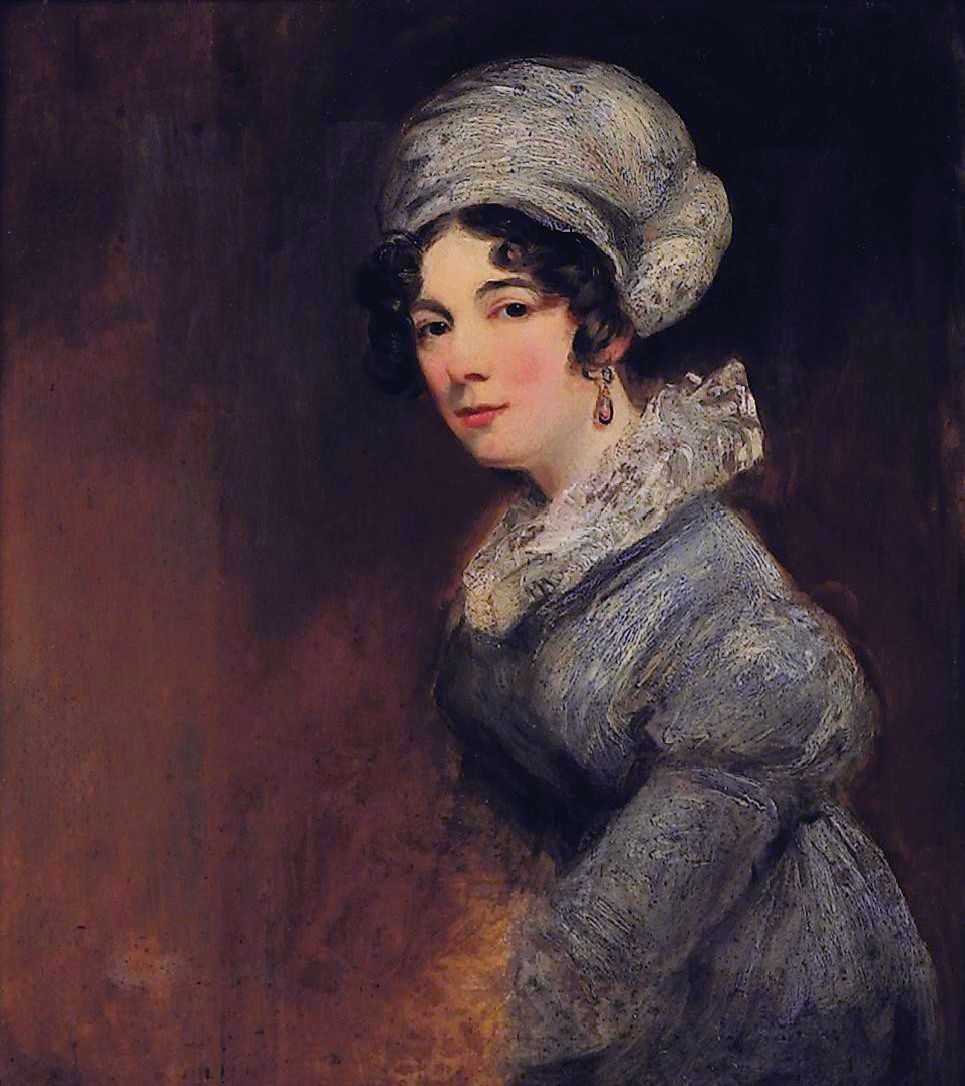
A 19th-century portrait of Lady Sarah Spencer, wife of the 3rd Baron Lyttelton, painted by John Jackson

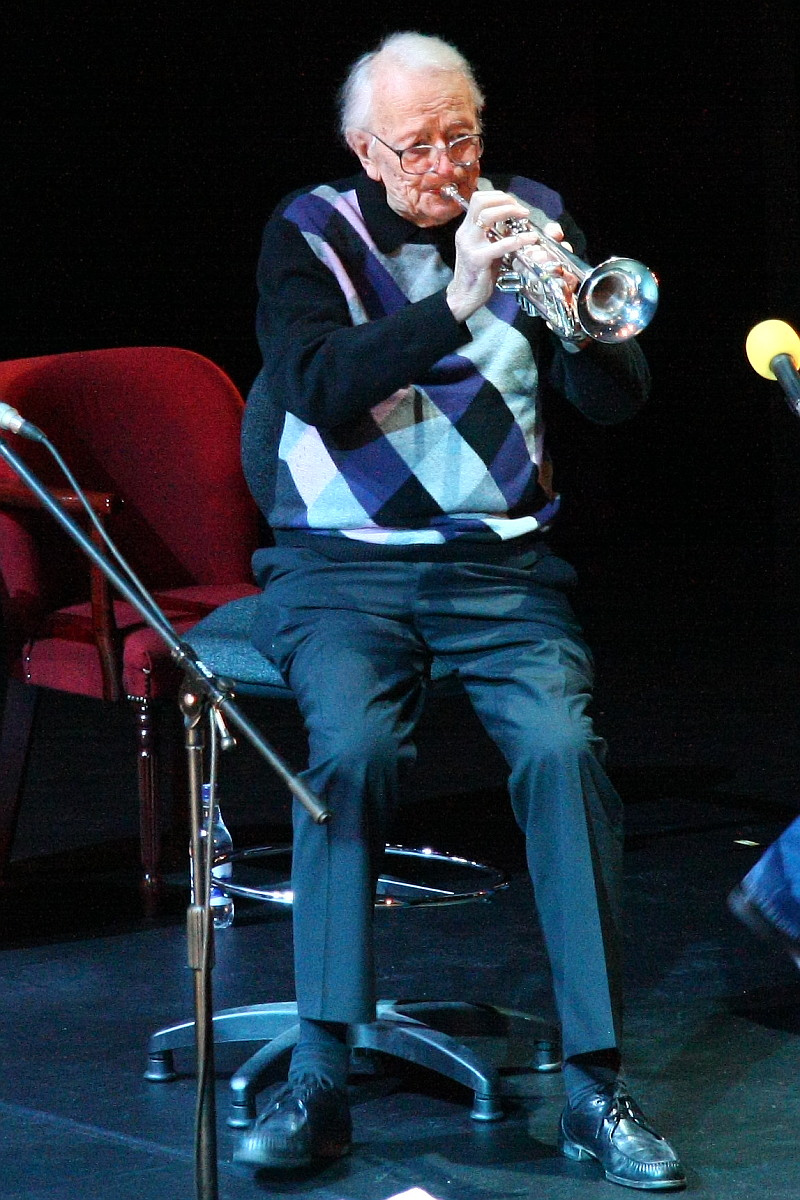
Humphrey Lyttelton (1921–2008), jazz musician and broadcaster

- Charles Lyttelton (1714–1768), Bishop of Carlisle; third son of the 4th Baronet
- Spencer Lyttelton (1818–1882), marshal of the ceremonies to the Royal Household; son of the 3rd Baron
- William Henry Lyttelton (1820–1884), Canon of Gloucester; son of the 3rd Baron. He married Emily Pepys (1833–1877), the child diarist.
- Lucy Lyttelton (1841–1925), married Lord Frederick Cavendish and later became an advocate of women's education; daughter of the 4th Baron Lyttelton. Lucy Cavendish College, Cambridge was named after her in 1965.
- George Lyttelton (1847–1913), civil servant, private secretary to William Ewart Gladstone and sportsman; son of the 4th Baron Lyttelton
- Arthur Lyttelton (1852–1903), Bishop of Southampton and sportsman; son of the 4th Baron Lyttelton
- General Sir Neville Lyttelton GCB, GCVO, PC (1845–1931); son of the 4th Baron Lyttelton
- Robert Lyttelton (1854–1939), noted cricketer; son of the 4th Baron Lyttelton
- Edward Lyttelton (1855–1942), priest, Headmaster of Eton College and sportsman; son of the 4th Baron Lyttelton
- Alfred Lyttelton (1857–1913), lawyer and sportsman; son of the 4th Baron Lyttelton. He married Dame Edith Balfour GBE (1865–1948), the novelist and spiritualist, and was the father of the 1st Viscount Chandos
- Charles Frederick Lyttelton (1887–1931), priest and cricketer; son of the 8th Viscount Cobham
- Lucy Masterman, née Lyttelton (1884–1977), politician and wife of Charles Masterman; daughter of Sir Neville Lyttelton
- George William Lyttelton (1883–1962), teacher and sportsman, co-author of the Lyttelton/Hart-Davis Letters; second son of the 5th Baron Lyttelton
- Humphrey Lyttelton (1921–2008), jazz musician and broadcaster; son of George William Lyttelton
- Viola Lyttelton (1912–1987), married the 5th Duke of Westminster; daughter of the 9th Viscount Cobham
- Nicholas Adrian Oliver Lyttelton (1937-2026), historian, son of the 1st Viscount Chandos

==== New Zealand ====
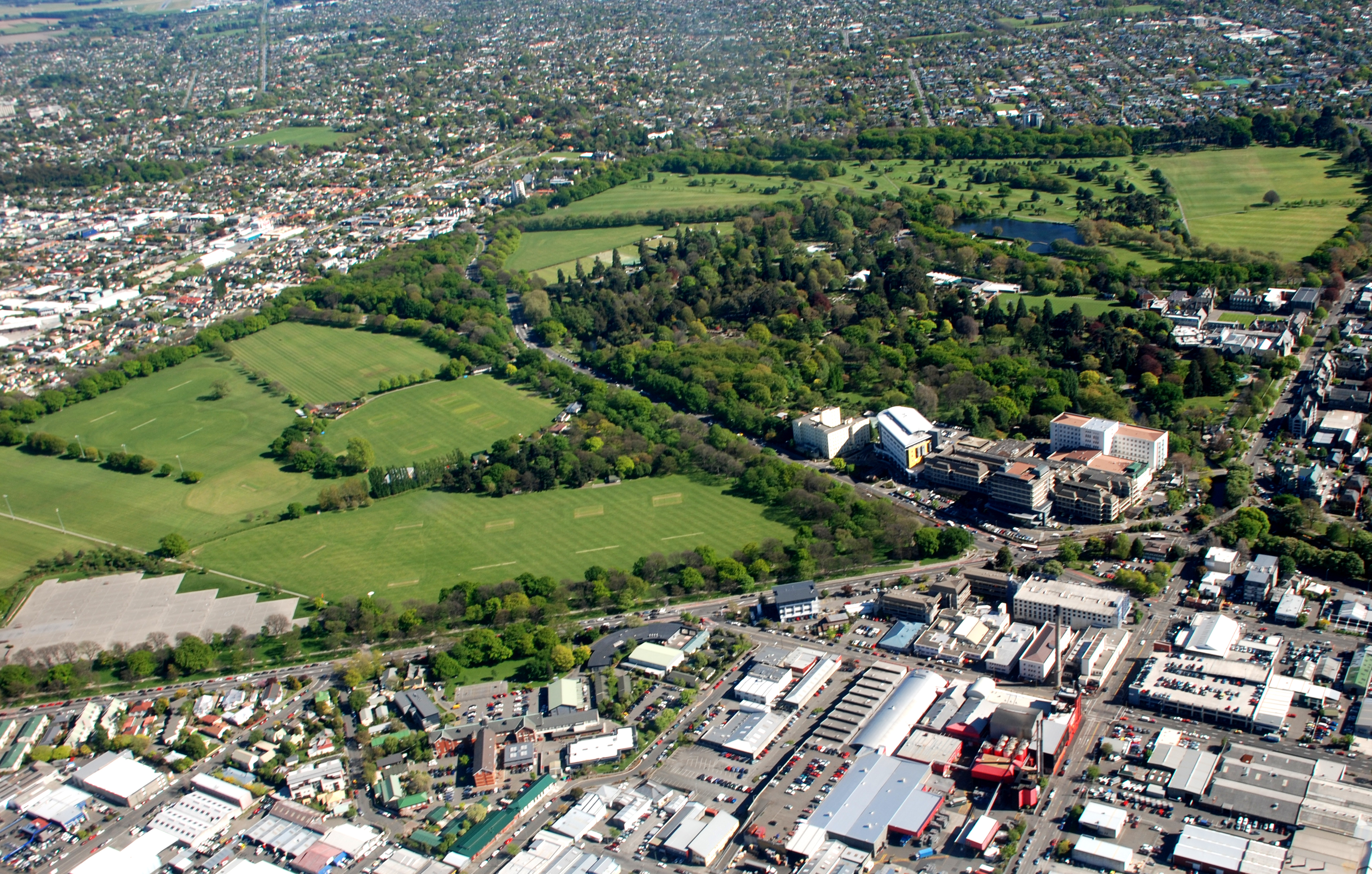
Hagley Park in Christchurch, New Zealand, named after the Worcestershire estate of the Lyttelton family

The 4th Baron Lyttelton (1817–1876) served as chairman of the Canterbury Association and did much to promote the development of Christchurch in New Zealand. Hagley Park, the largest urban open space in Christchurch, takes its name from Lord Lyttelton's country estate in Worcestershire. The first newspaper established by the Canterbury Association in Canterbury Settlement, New Zealand, named the Lyttelton Times, started in the port settlement of Lyttelton, New Zealand, in 1851.

The settlement of Lyttelton, established in 1850, was named after the family; from this Lyttelton district took its name. A railway line in New Zealand was named Lyttelton Line, and Christchurch's port has borne the name Lyttelton Harbour since 1858. Lord Lyttelton's great-grandson, the 10th Viscount Cobham, KG, GCMG, GCVO, TD, PC, DL (1909–1977) served as the ninth Governor-General of New Zealand (in office: 1957–1962) and also had a successful cricketing career.

==== Cricket ====
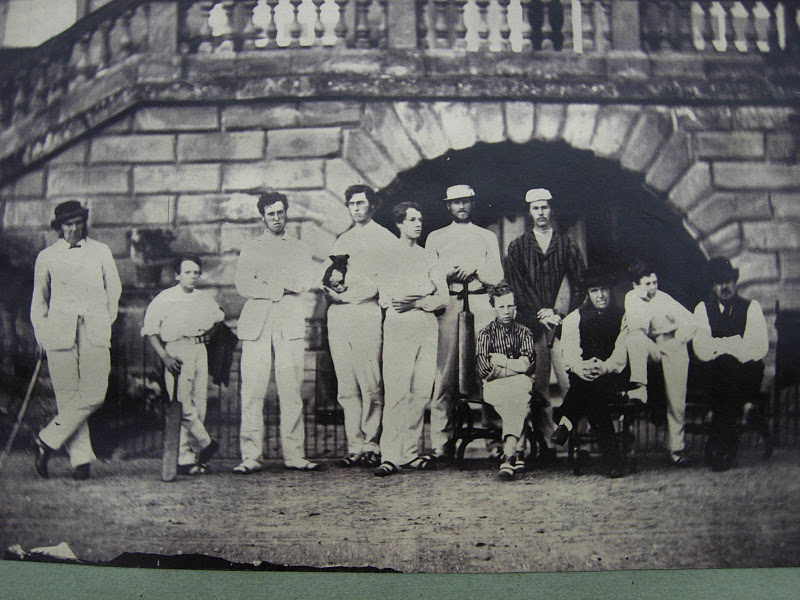
The Lyttelton XI on 26 August 1867.

In the late 19th and early 20th centuries, the Lytteltons were a notable cricketing family. The 4th and the 5th Barons Lyttelton, the latter's brothers (GWS Lyttelton, AT Lyttelton, RH Lyttelton, E Lyttelton, Hon. A Lyttelton), his sons (JC Lyttelton, CF Lyttelton) and his grandson (CJ Lyttelton) all played first-class cricket, and in the case of the Hon. A Lyttelton, Test cricket. On 26 August 1867, the Lyttelton XI, a cricket team composed of eleven members of the Lyttelton family, played a match against Bromsgrove School at Hagley Park in Worcestershire and won by ten wickets.

=== Pillaton/Hatherton branch ===
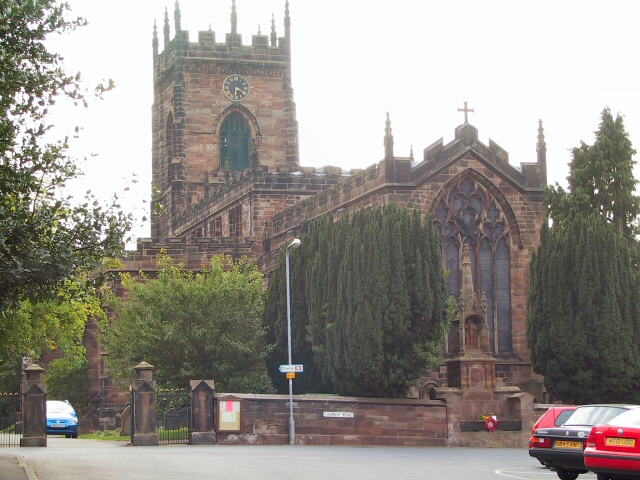
Penkridge parish church today. Much of its external appearance seems to be the result of alterations in Perpendicular style.

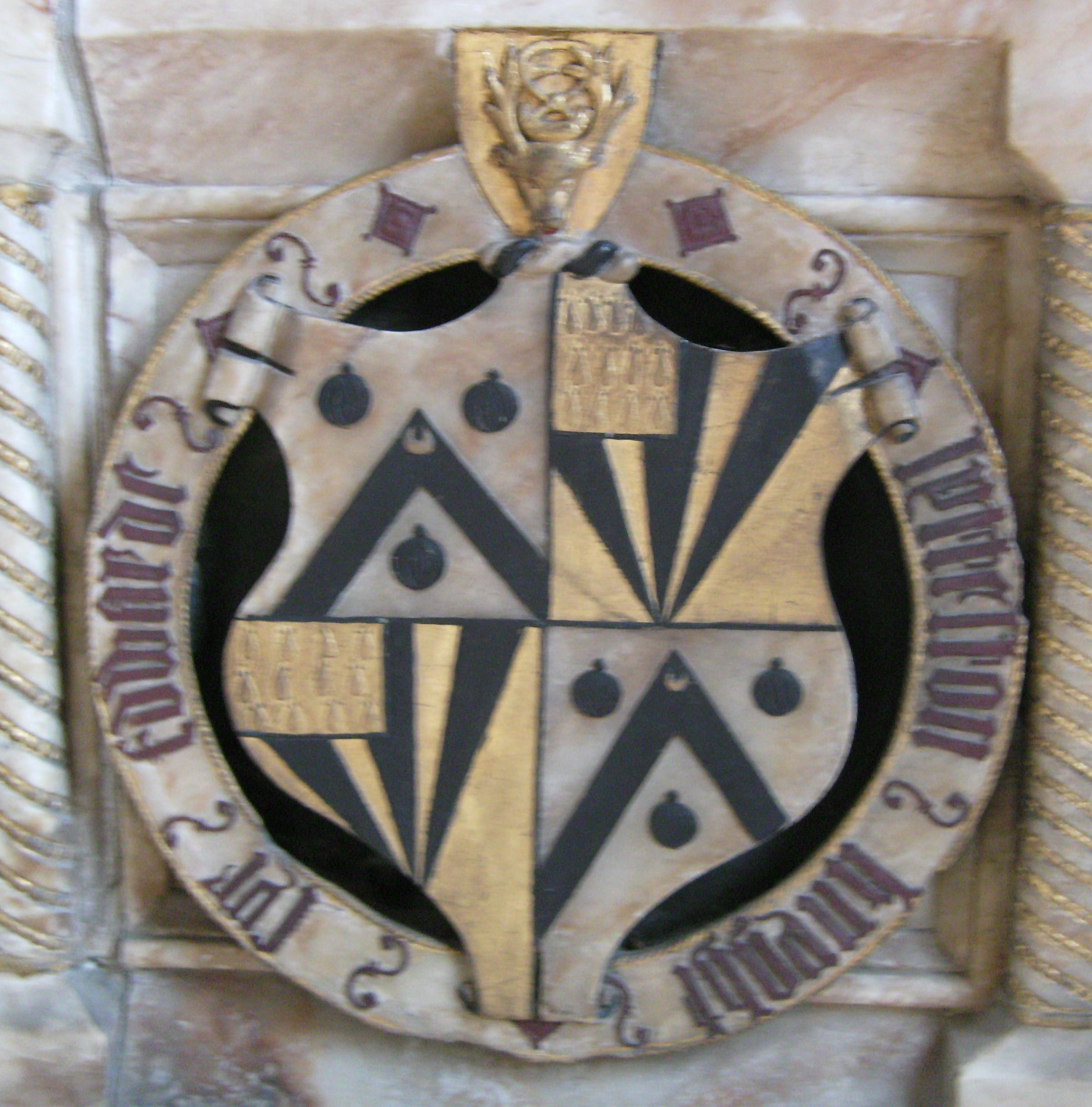
Arms of Sir Edward Littleton (died 1558).

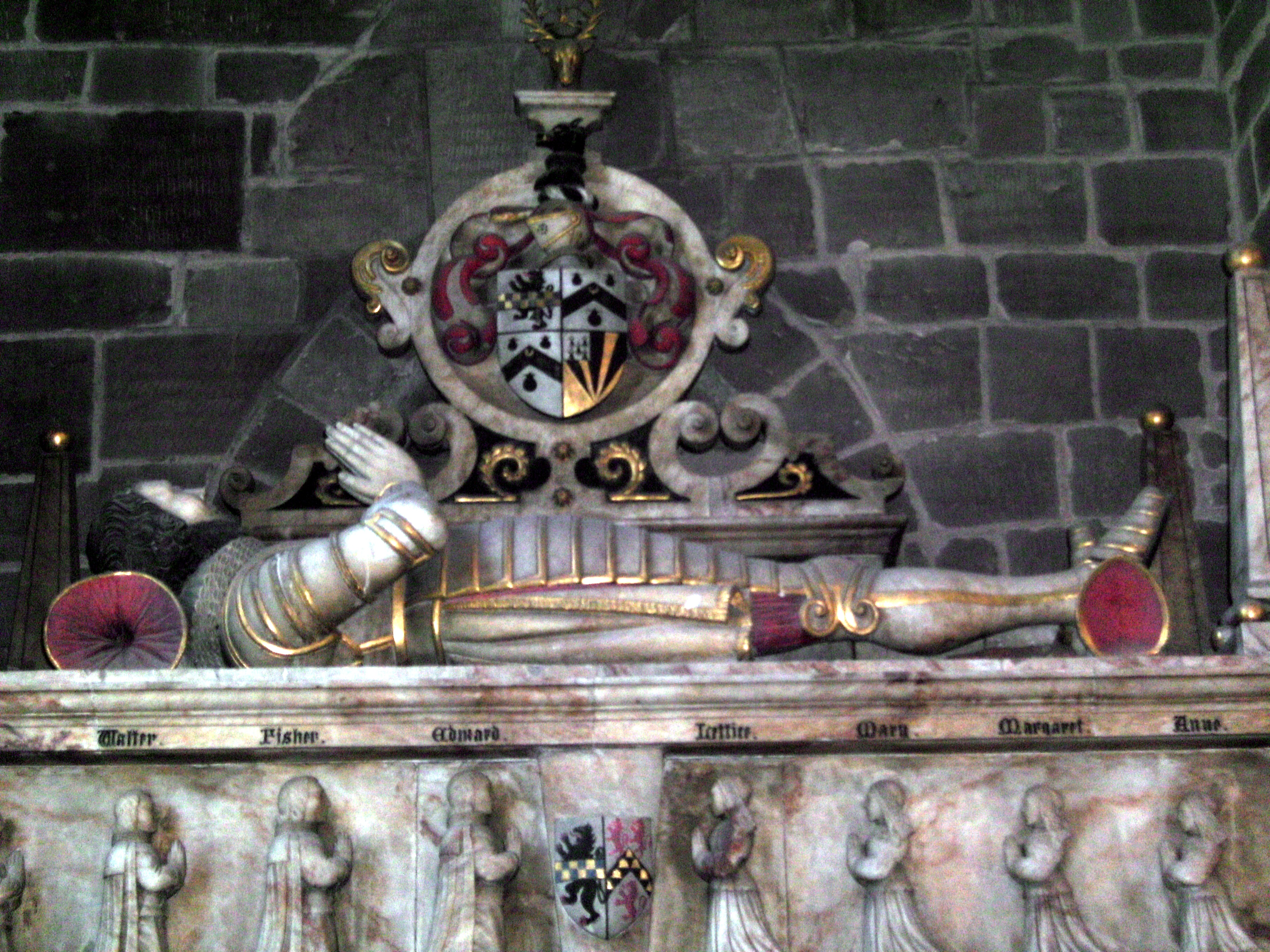
Effigy of Sir Edward Littleton (died 1629): part of a double monument in the north nave aisle of St Michael's church, Penkridge, Staffordshire.

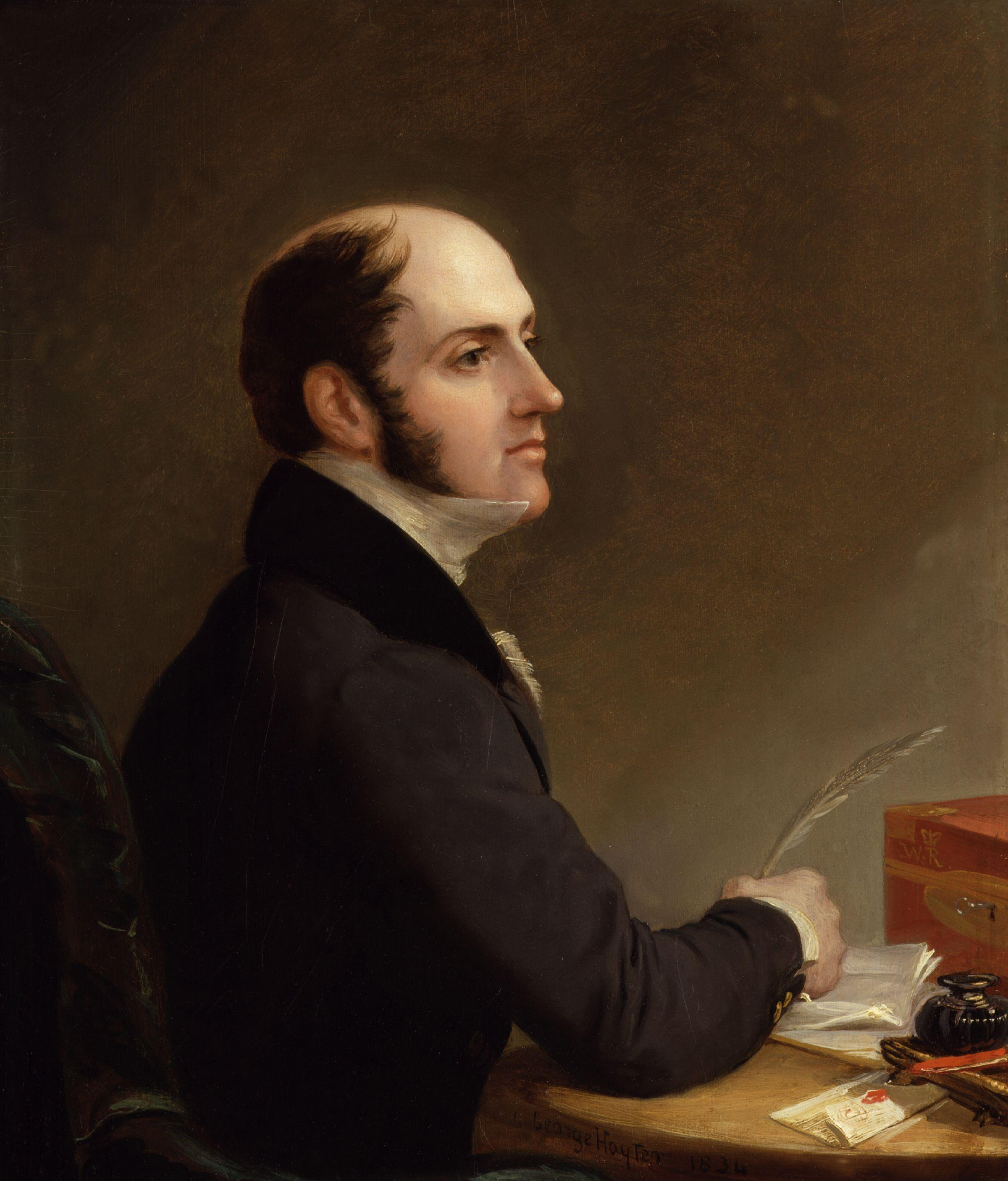
Edward Littleton, 1st Baron Hatherton

This branch of the Littleton/Lyttelton family is descended from Richard, the second son of Sir Thomas Littleton (c. 1407–1481), justice and author. He married Alice Winesbury or Wynnesbury, heiress of Pillaton Hall, near Penkridge in Staffordshire. Their eldest son, Edward Littleton († 1558), inherited Alice's lands and acquired lands on Cannock Chase. He was appointed Constable of Stafford Castle for life and was High Sheriff of Staffordshire on three occasions. He was the first of the line to be knighted. His descendant Edward Littleton received the Littleton Baronetcy, of Pillaton Hall, in 1627.

The title became extinct in 1812 on the death of the 4th Baronet, who had moved the seat of the family to Teddesley Hall and whose heir was a nephew, Edward John Walhouse. The latter inherited both the Littleton lands and the Walhouse lands, and adopted the surname of Littleton. A prominent politician, he was created Baron Hatherton, of Hatherton in the County of Stafford, in the Peerage of the United Kingdom in 1835. The peerage is currently held by Edward Charles Littleton, 8th Baron Hatherton (b. 1950).

The family vault is beneath the altar area of St.Michael and All Saints Church, Penkridge, Staffordshire.

==== Early members ====
- Edward Littleton (died 1558), younger son of Sir Thomas Littleton (c. 1407–1481), justice and author. He was succeeded in his estates by his son:
- Edward Littleton (died 1574), who was succeeded by his son:
- Edward Littleton (died 1610), who was succeeded by his third son:
- Edward Littleton (died 1629), who was succeeded by his son:
- Edward Littleton (c. 1599 – c. 1657, who was made a Baronet in 1627)

==== Baronets (1627) ====
- Sir Edward Littleton, 1st Baronet (c. 1599 – c. 1657)
- Sir Edward Littleton, 2nd Baronet (c. 1632–1709)
- Sir Edward Littleton, 3rd Baronet (died 1742)
- Sir Edward Littleton, 4th Baronet (1727–1812)

==== Barons Hatherton (1835) ====
- Edward John Littleton, 1st Baron Hatherton (1791–1863)
- Edward Richard Littleton, 2nd Baron Hatherton (1815–1888)
- Edward George Littleton, 3rd Baron Hatherton (1842–1930)
- Edward Charles Littleton, 4th Baron Hatherton (1868–1944)
- Edward Thomas Littleton, 5th Baron Hatherton (1900–1969)
- John Walter Littleton, 6th Baron Hatherton (1906–1973)
- Thomas Charles Littleton, 7th Baron Hatherton (1907–1985)
- Edward Charles Littleton, 8th Baron Hatherton (b. 1950)

The heir apparent is the present holder's son the Hon. Thomas Edward Littleton (b. 1977).

=== Stoke Milburgh branch ===
This branch of the Littleton/Lyttelton family is descended from Thomas Littleton, third son of Sir Thomas Littleton (c. 1407–1481), justice and author. He is recorded as Thomas Litleton of Speechly and incumbent of Spetchley, Worcestershire. His descendant Adam Littleton received the Littleton Baronetcy, of Stoke Milburgh, in 1642. This title became extinct in 1709 upon the death of the 3rd Baronet, a former Speaker of the House of Commons.

==== Baronets (1642) ====
- Sir Adam Littleton, 1st Baronet (died 1647)
- Sir Thomas Littleton, 2nd Baronet (c. 1621–1681)
- Sir Thomas Littleton, 3rd Baronet (1647–1709)

== Family tree ==
Family tree of the Duke of Buckingham and Chandos, Marquess of Buckingham, Marquess of Chandos, Viscount Cobham, Earl Temple, Earl Temple of Stowe, Baron Cobham, Baron Grenville, Baron Lyttelton, Baron Westcote and Temple baronets

Peter Temple
Anthony Temple	John Temple
Baronet, of Stowe, in the County of Buckingham, 1611
William Temple; 1555–1627	Thomas Temple; 1567–1637; 1st Baronet, of Stowe	Alexander Temple; 1583–1629
Baronet, of Frankley, in the County of Worcester, 1618
John Temple; 1600–1677	Peter Temple; 1592–1653; 2nd Baronet, of Stowe	John Temple; 1593–1632	James Temple; 1606–1680	Thomas Lyttelton; 1593–1650; 1st Baronet, of Frankley
Baronet, of Stowe, in the County of Buckingham, 1662
Thomas Temple; 1613/14–1674; 1st Baronet, of Stowe	Peter Temple; 1613–1660	Henry Lyttelton; 1624–1693; 2nd Baronet, of Frankley	Charles Lyttelton; 1628–1716; 3rd Baronet, of Frankley
Baronetcy of Stowe (1662 creation) extinct, 1674
John Temple; 1632–1705	Richard Temple; 1634–1697; 3rd Baronet, of Stowe	Eleanor Temple d. 1729 m. Richard Grenville	William Temple d. 1706
Viscount Palmerston and Baron Temple, of Mount Temple in the County of Sligo, 1723	Baron Cobham, of Cobham in the County of Kent (6th creation), 1714; Viscount Cobham and Baron Cobham, of Cobham in the County of Kent (7th creation), 1718	Earl Temple, 1749
Henry Temple c. 1673–1757; 1st Viscount Palmerston and Baron Temple	Richard Temple; 1675–1749; 1st Viscount Cobham, etc., 4th Baronet, of Stowe	Hester Grenville c. 1690–1752; 1st Countess Temple, 2nd Viscountess Cobham and 2nd Baroness Cobham	Richard Grenville; 1678–1727	Christian Temple	Thomas Lyttelton; 1686–1751; 4th Baronet, of Frankley	William Temple; 1694–1760; 5th Baronet, of Stowe	Peter Temple d. 1761; 6th Baronet, of Stowe
Barony of Cobham (1714 creation) extinct, 1749
Henry, Lord Temple	Richard Temple; 1731–1786; 7th Baronet, of Stowe
Baron Lyttelton (1st creation), 1756	Baron Westcote, 1776; Baron Lyttelton (2nd creation), 1794	Baronetcy of Stowe dormant, 1786
Henry Temple; 1739–1802; 2nd Viscount Palmerston and Baron Temple	Richard Grenville-Temple; 1711–1779; 2nd Earl Temple, 3rd Viscount Cobham, etc.	George Grenville; 1712–1770	Hester Grenville; 1720–1803; Baroness Chatham m. William Pitt the Elder, Earl of Chatham and Viscount Pitt	George Lyttelton; 1709–1773; 1st Baron Lyttelton, 5th Baronet, of Frankley	William Henry Lyttelton; 1724–1808; 1st Baron Lyttelton
Marquess of Buckingham (2nd creation), 1784	Baron Grenville, of Wotton under Bernewood in the County of Buckingham, 1790
George Nugent-Temple-Grenville; 1753–1813; 1st Marquess of Buckingham, 3rd Earl Temple, 2nd Earl Nugent, 4th Viscount Cobham, etc.	William Wyndham Grenville; 1759–1834; 1st Baron Grenville	William Pitt the Younger; 1759–1806	Thomas Lyttelton; 1744–1779; 2nd Baron Lyttelton, 5th Baronet, of Frankley
Barony of Grenville extinct, 1834	Barony of Lyttelton and Baronetcy of Frankley extinct, 1779
Duke of Buckingham and Chandos, Marquess of Chandos and Earl Temple of Stowe, 1822
Henry John Temple; 1784–1865; 3rd Viscount Palmerston and Baron Temple	Richard Temple-Nugent-Brydges-Chandos-Grenville; 1776–1839; 1st Duke of Buckingham and Chandos, Marquess of Chandos, and Earl Temple of Stowe, 2nd Marquess of Buckingham, 3rd Earl Nugent, 4th Earl Temple, 5th Viscount Cobham, etc.	George Fulke Lyttelton; 1763–1828; 2nd Baron Lyttelton	William Henry Lyttelton; 1782–1837; 3rd Baron Lyttelton
Richard Plantagenet Temple-Nugent-Brydges-Chandos-Grenville; 1797–1861; 2nd Duke of Buckingham and Chandos, Marquess of Chandos, and Earl Temple of Stowe, 3rd Marquess of Buckingham, 4th Earl Nugent, 6th Viscount Cobham, etc.
Richard Plantagenet Campbell Temple-Nugent-Brydges-Chandos-Grenville; 1823–1889; 3rd Duke of Buckingham and Chandos, Marquess of Chandos, and Earl Temple of Stowe, 4th Marquess of Buckingham, 5th Earl Nugent, 6th Earl Temple, 7th Viscount Cobham, etc.	Anna Eliza Mary (Temple-Nugent-Brydges-Chandos-Grenville) Gore-Langton; 1820–1879	William Henry Powell Gore-Langton; 1824–1873	George William Lyttelton; 1817–1876; 4th Baron Lyttelton
Dukedom of Buckingham and Chandos, Marquessates of Buckingham and Chandos, and the Earldoms of Temple (1st creation) and of Nugent extinct, 1889
William Stephen Temple-Gore-Langton; 1847–1902; 4th Earl Temple of Stowe	Charles George Lyttelton; 1842–1922; 8th Viscount Cobham, etc.
Algernon William Stephen Temple-Gore-Langton; 1871–1940; 5th Earl Temple of Stowe	Chandos Graham Temple-Gore-Langton; 1873–1921	Evelyn Arthur Grenville Temple-Gore-Langton; 1884–1972	John Cavendish Lyttelton; 1881–1949; 9th Viscount Cobham, etc.
Chandos Grenville Temple-Gore-Langton; 1909–1966; 6th Earl Temple of Stowe	Ronald Stephen Brydges Temple-Gore-Langton; 1910–1988; 7th Earl Temple of Stowe	Walter Grenville Algernon Temple-Gore-Langton; 1924–2013; 8th Earl Temple of Stowe	Charles John Lyttelton; 1909–1977; 10th Viscount Cobham, etc.
James Grenville Temple-Gore-Langton b. 1955; 9th Earl Temple of Stowe	John William Leonard Lyttelton; 1943–2006; 11th Viscount Cobham, etc.	Christopher Charles Lyttelton b. 1947; 12th Viscount Cobham, etc.
Rowan Caradoc Temple-Gore-Langton b. 1987	Oliver Christopher Lyttelton b. 1976
Heir apparent to the Earl Temple of Stowe	Heir apparent to the Viscount Cobham
