= Charles Lyttelton, 10th Viscount Cobham =

English aristocrat; 9th Governor-General of New Zealand (1909–1977)

The Right Honourable The Viscount Cobham KG GCMG GCVO TD PC DL
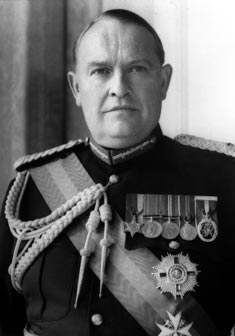
- Cobham c. 1957

9th Governor-General of New Zealand
- In office 5 September 1957 – 13 September 1962
- Monarch: Elizabeth II
- Prime Minister: Sidney Holland; Keith Holyoake; Walter Nash
- Preceded by: The Lord Norrie
- Succeeded by: The Lord Ballantrae

Personal details
- Born: 8 August 1909 Kensington, London, England
- Died: 20 March 1977 (aged 67) Marylebone, London, England
- Spouse: Elizabeth Alison Makeig-Jones (m. 1942)
- Children: 8, including John and Christopher
- Parent(s): John Lyttelton, 9th Viscount Cobham; Violet Yolande Leonard

Charles John Lyttelton, 10th Viscount Cobham (8 August 1909 – 20 March 1977) was the ninth Governor-General of New Zealand and an English cricketer from the Lyttelton family.

== Background and education ==
Lyttelton was born in Kensington, London, the son of John Lyttelton, 9th Viscount Cobham, and Violet Yolande Leonard. He was a cousin of the musician Humphrey Lyttelton. He was educated at Eton College and Trinity College, Cambridge, graduating with a law degree in 1932. He had a family connection with New Zealand, where he became governor-general, through his great-grandfather George Lyttelton, 4th Baron Lyttelton, who was chairman of the Canterbury Association and contributed financially to the early development of Christchurch. Hagley Park is named after their family estate (Hagley Park, Worcestershire), and the port town of Lyttelton bears his great-grandfather's name. He visited New Zealand in 1950 in relation to property holdings in Christchurch.

== Military service ==
Lyttelton joined the Territorial Army in 1933. He served in the Second World War with the British Expeditionary Force in France from 1940. He was commander of the 5th Regiment, Maritime Royal Artillery from 1943.

Lyttelton was made Honorary Colonel of Queen's Own Warwickshire and Worcestershire Yeomanry on 1 April 1969.

== Political career ==
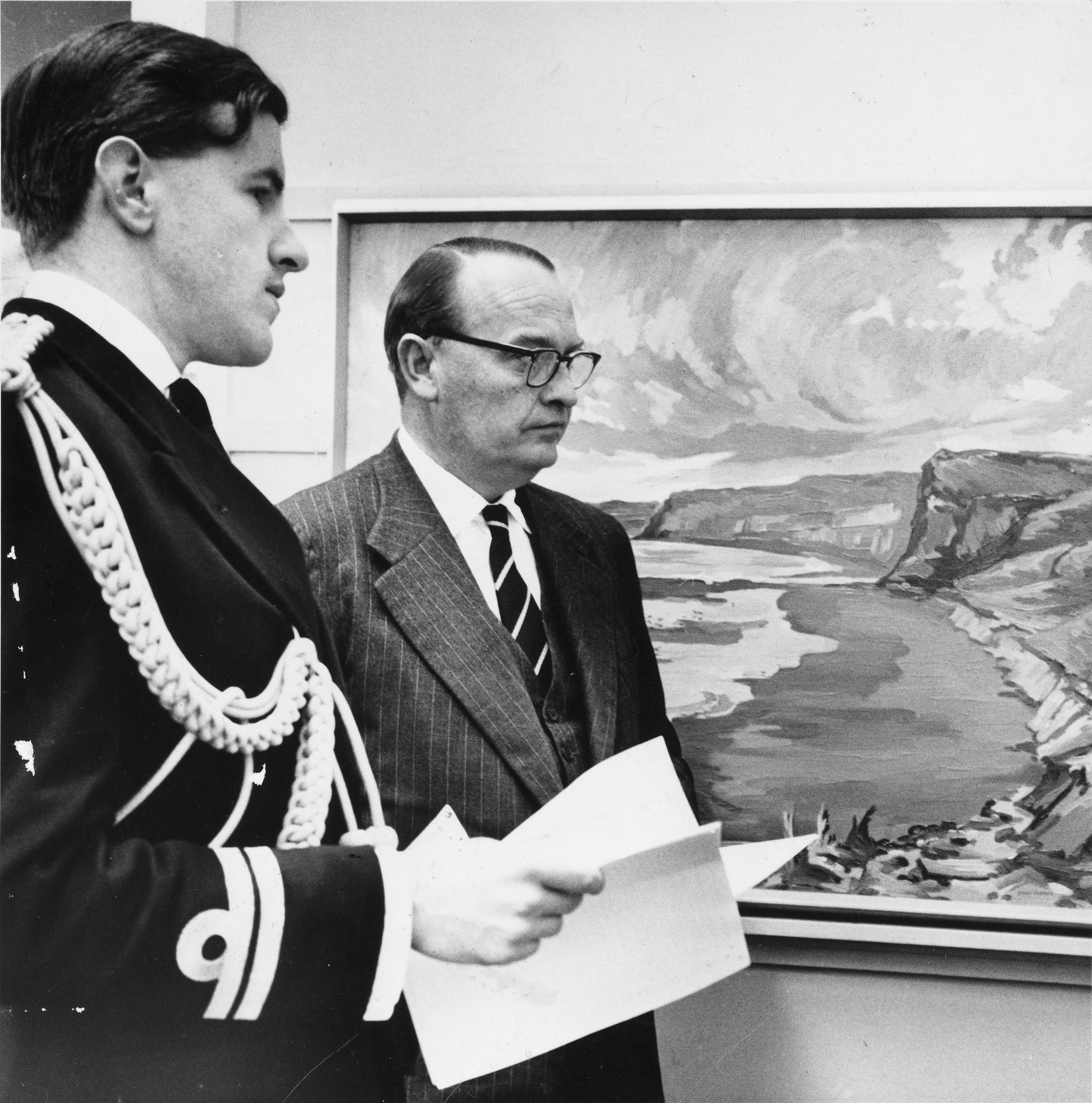
Viscount Cobham (right) on 26 August 1958 with Neil Durden-Smith in the National Art Gallery

After the war, Lyttelton wanted to follow in his father's footsteps and enter the House of Commons. However, his father died in 1949 and he succeeded as Viscount Cobham, precluding a career in the Commons.

Cobham became the ninth Governor-General of New Zealand on 5 September 1957. Although from an aristocratic background, he proved popular. He was seen as an outdoors man with a sporting prowess in cricket, and golf, and a competent rugby judge. He was good with a gun and an enthusiastic fly fisherman, all attributes that resonated well with New Zealanders. Significant events during his tenure included the independence of Western Samoa, the opening of the Auckland Harbour Bridge, and the construction of Wellington Airport. Cobham opened the redeveloped airport, and the new access road to Miramar built on reclaimed land as part of the airport development was named Cobham Drive.

Cobham was served by three Prime Ministers: Sidney Holland (1949–1957), Keith Holyoake (1957 and 1960–1972) and Walter Nash (1957–1960). He was most careful to not comment on controversial matters, and had a good working relationship with all three. He was instrumental in setting up the Outward Bound outdoor education organisation in New Zealand, opening the Outward Bound school in Anakiwa near Picton in September 1962, which bears his name. He visited the school in 1966 and was pleased with the progress that had been made.

Cobham served until 13 September 1962. He was a skilled orator and a book of his speeches sold 50,000 copies; he donated the £10,000 profit to Outward Bound. Cobham Oval in Whangarei and Cobham Court in Porirua are named after him.

== Cricket ==
Charles Lyttelton, 10th Viscount Cobham
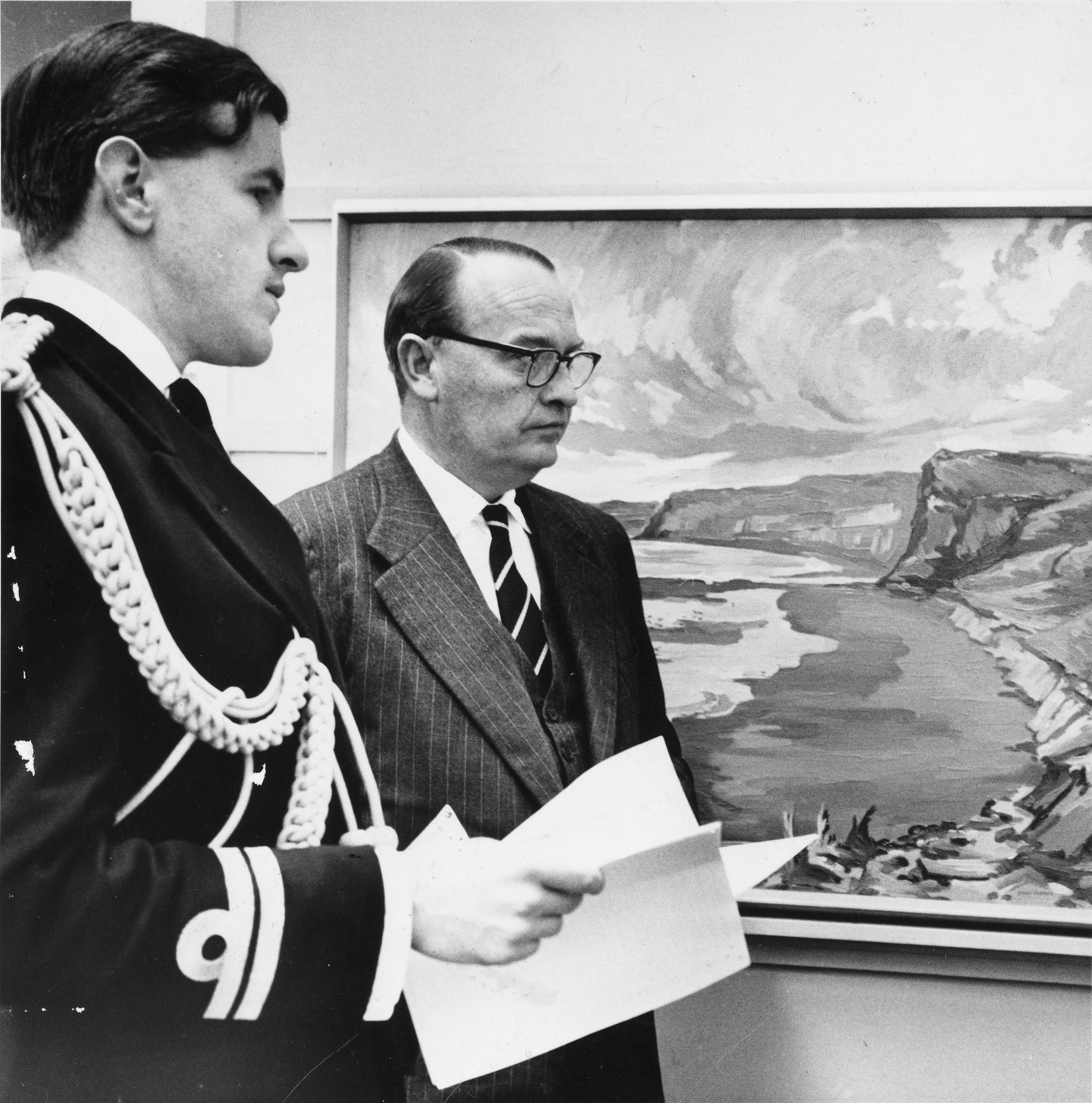

Cricket information
- Batting: Right-handed
- Bowling: Right-arm medium
- Role: Bowler

Domestic team information
- Years: Team
- 1932–1939: Worcestershire
- 1935–1936: MCC
- FC debut: 25 June 1932 Worcestershire v Gloucestershire
- Last FC: 24 February 1961 New Zealand Governor's XI v MCC

Career statistics
Competition	First-class
Matches	104
Runs scored	3,181
Batting average	20.26
100s/50s	1/13
Top score	162
Balls bowled	2,195
Wickets	32
Bowling average	41.18
5 wickets in innings	0
10 wickets in match	0
Best bowling	4/83
Catches/stumpings	52/–
- Source: CricketArchive, 14 August 2007

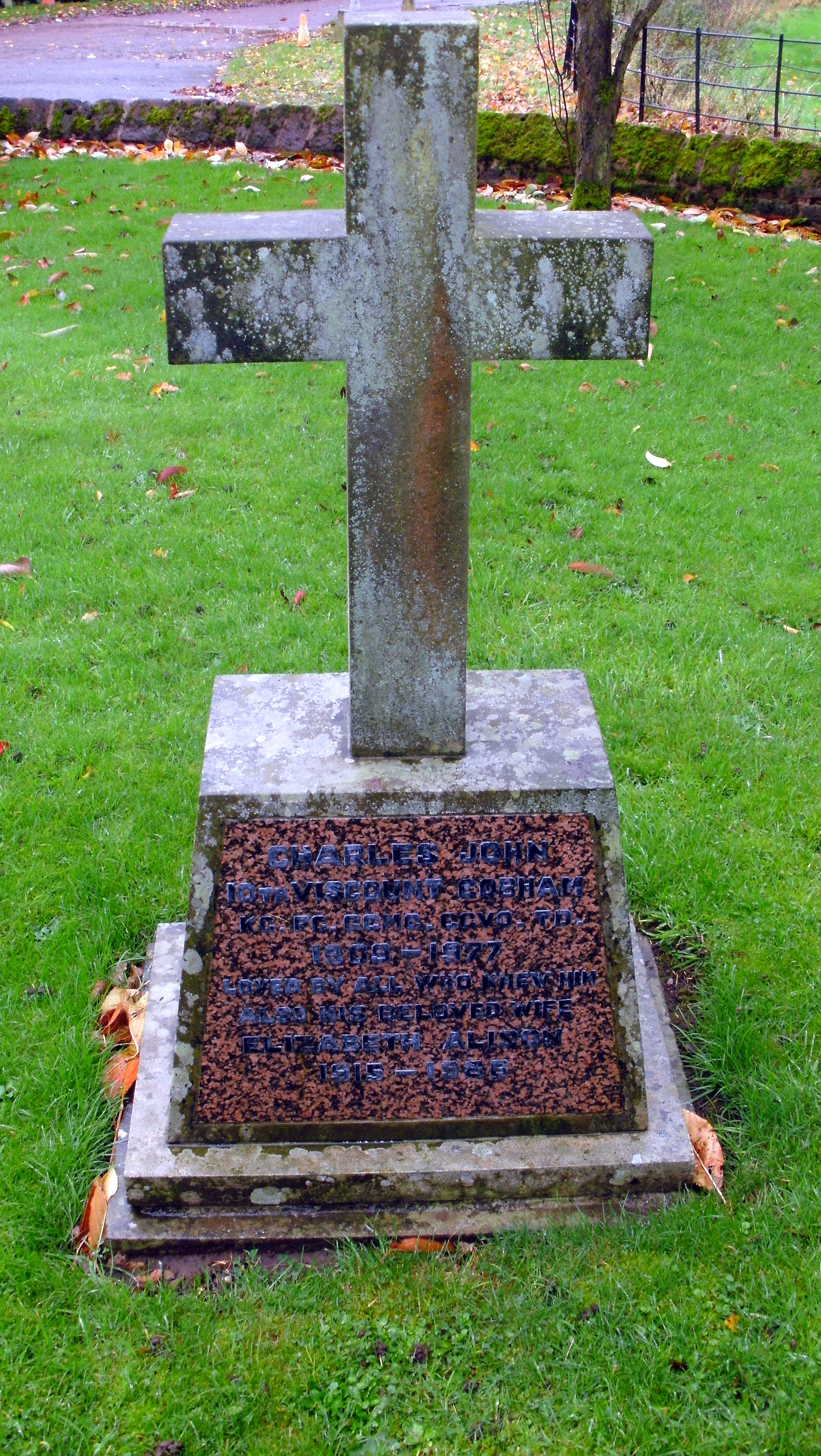
St John the Baptist Church, Hagley, grave of Charles Lyttelton, 10th Viscount Cobham.

Lyttelton enjoyed a career in first-class cricket, playing more than 90 times for Worcestershire in the 1930s and captaining the club between 1936 and 1939.

He made his first-class debut, against Gloucestershire, in June 1932, but made a duck in his only innings and did not reappear for two years. He played five times in 1934, but it was only the following season that he became established in the side, playing about 20 matches a year from then until the Second World War, with the exception of 1937 when he appeared only twice.

His highest score (and only first-class century) was the 162 he made against Leicestershire in 1938, but he made many other useful contributions, reaching 50 on 14 further occasions. His most productive year was 1938, when he scored 741 runs at an average of 21.17.

With the ball, his first victim (in July 1934) was Charlie Barnett, while in 1935 he produced his best innings' bowling, claiming 4–83 against the South Africans. After 1935 his bowling became largely occasional, and with the exception of nine wickets in 1938, he never again took more than three in a season.

He played ten games for Marylebone Cricket Club (MCC) pre-war: one against Oxford University in 1935, and nine on MCC's tour of Australia and New Zealand during the following winter.

His cricketing career proper ended with the outbreak of war, but (now listed on the scorecard as Lord Cobham, having succeeded to the title in 1949) he played for an "MCC New Zealand Touring Team" against a strong "London New Zealand Club" side in 1954, taking two wickets including that of Bill Merritt. Remarkably, he made a one-off return to first-class action aged 51 in February 1961, more than two decades after his previous appearance at that level, when as Governor-General he captained a New Zealand side against MCC at Auckland: he showed he still had ability, with a handy first-innings 44 from number ten in the order.

A number of his relatives played first-class cricket. His great-grandfather George played for Cambridge University in the 1830s, his grandfather (also Charles) turned out for teams including Cambridge and MCC in the 1860s, his father John made a handful of appearances for Worcestershire in the 1920s, and his uncle – another Charles – played for Worcestershire, Cambridge and MCC before the First World War.

Lyttelton was a former President of the MCC when he became embroiled in what became known as the D’Oliveira affair. Bruce Murray writes that "On 12 March 1968 Vorster saw Lord Cobham, a former MCC President, in Cape Town, and told him 'quite categorically' that D’Oliveira would not be acceptable. As Cobham later recalled in a letter to Sir de Villiers Graaff, the leader of the United Party, 'As I remember, he said that a Cape Coloured, alone of all races, castes and creeds, would be likely to provide a catalyst to the potentially explosive – or possibly one should say tricky – Cape Coloured situation'. In April Lord Cobham duly conveyed this information to Billy Griffith when he saw him at Lord’s".

== Family ==
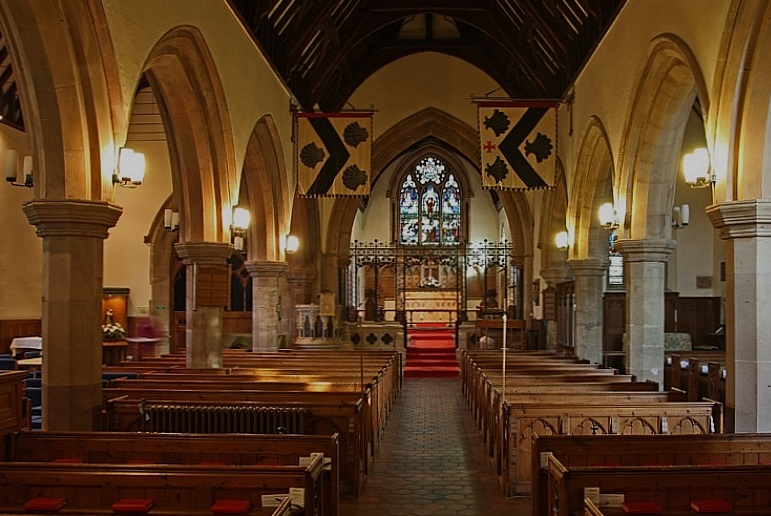
Interior of St John the Baptist, Hagley, with the Garter banners of the 10th Viscount Cobham and the 1st Viscount Chandos

Lord Cobham married Elizabeth Alison Makeig-Jones on 30 April 1942 in Chelsea, London. They had four sons and four daughters. He died in Marylebone, London, on 20 March 1977, and was survived by his wife and children. He was cremated in London; his ashes were returned to Hagley for burial in the Lyttelton plot at Hagley parish church.

Children of Charles Lyttelton, 10th Viscount Cobham:

- John William Leonard Lyttelton, 11th Viscount Cobham (1943–2006); childless
- Hon. Juliet Meriel Lyttelton (b. 1944); married, 4 children
- Hon. Elizabeth Catherine Lyttelton (b. 1946); married George Cecil Brooke Weld-Forester, 8th Baron Forester, 4 children including the 9th Baron Forester
- Christopher Charles Lyttelton, 12th Viscount Cobham (b. 1947), married, 2 children. His heir apparent is his son Oliver.
- Hon. Richard Cavendish Lyttelton (b. 1949); married, 2 children. He is a Trustee of the EMI Music Sound Foundation and worked in the recording industry with EMI Music for many years.
- Hon. Nicholas Makeig Lyttelton (1951–2014); married, 1 son (died 2006)
- Hon. Lucy Lyttelton (b. 1954); married, 3 sons
- Hon. Sarah Lyttelton (1954–2015); married Nicholas Bedford, 2 daughters

His Garter banner, which hung in St. George's Chapel in Windsor during his lifetime, is now on display in the church of St John the Baptist, Hagley.

== Arms ==
Coat of arms of Charles John Lyttelton, 10th Viscount Cobham
Notes The arms of Charles Lyttelton, Viscount Cobham consist of: (Carved depiction) Crest A Moor’s Head in profile, couped at the shoulders proper, wreathed about the temples Argent and Sable. Escutcheon Argent, a Chevron between three Escallops Sable (Lyttelton). Supporters On either side a Merman proper, holding in the exterior hand a Trident Or. Motto Ung Dieu, ung roy (One God, one King)

Sporting positions
Preceded by Cyril Walters	Worcestershire County Cricket Captain; 1936–1939	Vacant no cricket 1940–1945 Title next held by Sandy Singleton
Political offices
Preceded by The Lord Norrie	Governor-General of New Zealand; 1957–1962	Succeeded by Sir Bernard Fergusson
Preceded by The Duke of Westminster	Lord Steward; 1967–1972	Succeeded by The Duke of Northumberland
Honorary titles
Preceded by Sir William Tennant	Lord Lieutenant of Worcestershire; 1963–1974	Office merged with Herefordshire
Preceded by The Marquess of Salisbury	Chancellor of the Order of the Garter; 1972–1977	Succeeded by The Marquess of Abergavenny
Peerage of Great Britain
Preceded by John Lyttelton	Viscount Cobham; 1949–1977	Succeeded by John Lyttelton
