= Leo Quinn =

British business executive (born 1956)

Leo Quinn (born 13 December 1956) is a British business executive. In 2015 he became the Group Chief Executive of Balfour Beatty. In October 2013, he founded The 5% Club

== Early life and education ==
Quinn was raised in Ladbroke Grove and was educated at the London Oratory School. As a young man Quinn worked at his father's business in West London. He attended University of Surrey intending to study electronic and electrical engineering before transferring to Portsmouth Polytechnic, where he switched to civil engineering. He then went to Imperial College earning an MSc in management science.

== Career ==
Quinn worked as a civil engineer for Balfour Beatty, beginning in 1979. He worked for 16 years with Honeywell inc. in various management roles, including Global President of H&BC Enterprise Solutions.

For three years, Quinn was COO in the production management division of Invensys, a multinational engineering and information technology company headquartered in London, United Kingdom.

From 2004 to 2008, Quinn was Chief Executive of De La Rue plc, a support service company involved in security printing, papermaking and cash handling systems.

He was also a director of Tomkins plc.

Quinn became Group Chief Executive of QinetiQ Group PLC in November 2009, replacing Graham Love. and succeeded in increasing the company's pre-tax profits. He remained in this position until 2014, when he was hired by Balfour Beatty, which had been struggling financially, to create a turnaround plan.

In October 2013, Quinn founded The 5% Club.

== Personal ==
Quinn is married with two sons. Quinn has three brothers.
