= Viscount Cobham =

Viscountcy in the Peerage of Great Britain

Viscountcy of Cobham
- Arms: Argent, a Chevron between three Escallops Sable (Lyttelton). Crest: A Moor’s Head in profile, couped at the shoulders proper, wreathed about the temples Argent and Sable. Supporters: On either side a Merman proper, holding in the exterior hand a Trident Or.
- Creation date: 23 May 1718
- Created by: George I
- Peerage: Peerage of Great Britain
- First holder: Richard Temple, 1st Viscount Cobham
- Present holder: Christopher Charles Lyttelton, 12th Viscount Cobham
- Heir apparent: Oliver Lyttelton, Baron Lyttelton
- Remainder to: Special remainder - see main text
- Subsidiary titles: Baron Cobham; Baron Westcote; Baron Lyttelton; Baronet ‘of Frankley’
- Status: Extant
- Seat: Hagley Hall
- Motto: UNG DIEU UNG ROY (One God, one King)

Viscount Cobham is a title in the Peerage of Great Britain that was created in 1718. Owing to its special remainder, the title has passed through several families. Since 1889, it has been held by members of the Lyttelton family.

The barony and viscountcy of Cobham were subsidiary titles of the Earldom of Temple from 1749 to 1784, then subsidiary titles of the Marquessate of Buckingham from 1784 to 1822 and of the Dukedom of Buckingham and Chandos from 1822 to 1889. Since the latter year, the Cobham titles have been merged with the titles of Baron Lyttelton and Baron Westcote.

== History ==
=== Creation of the title ===
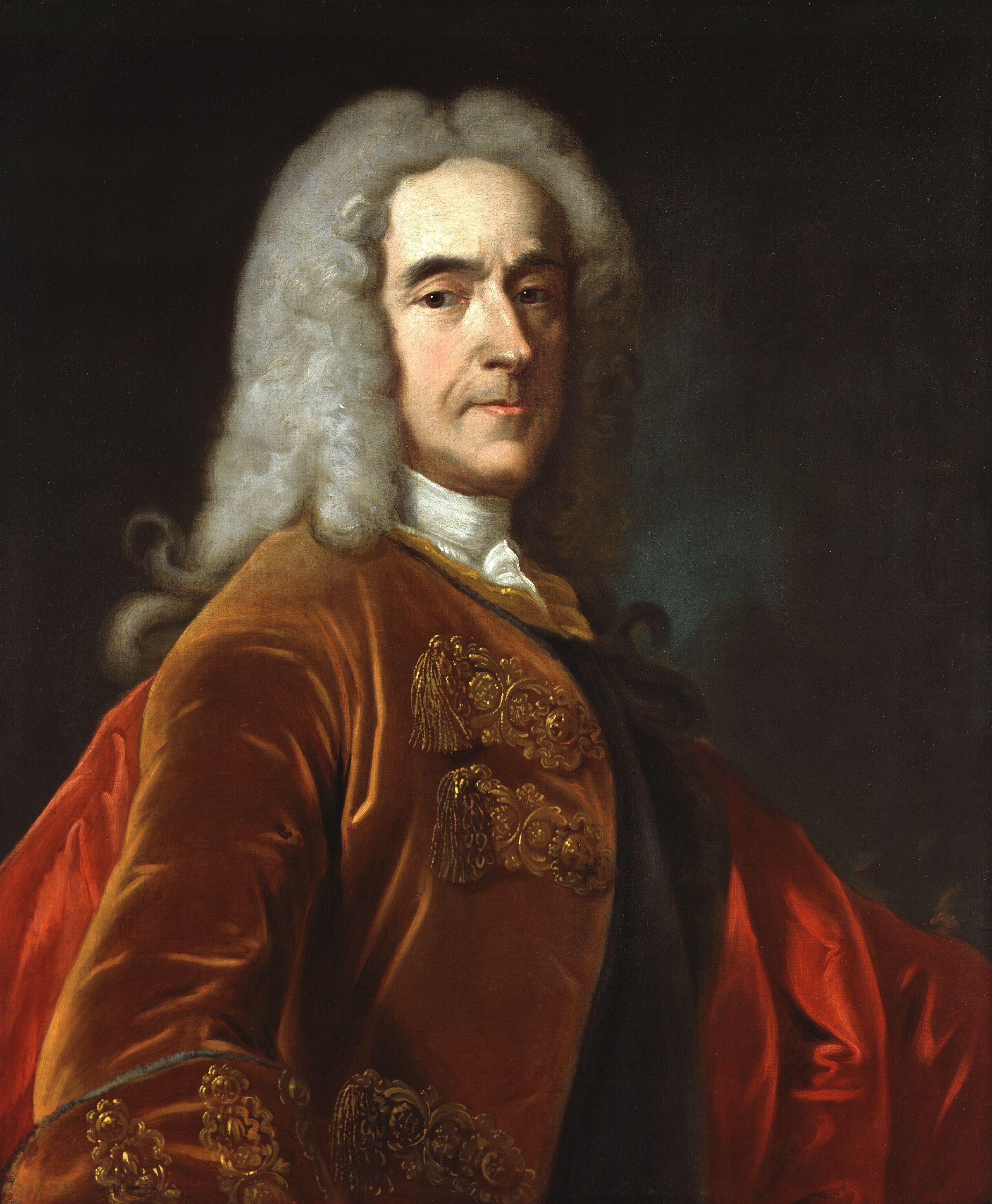
Richard Temple, 1st Viscount Cobham

The viscountcy of Cobham was created in 1718 for Field Marshal Sir Richard Temple, 1st Baron Cobham, 4th Baronet, of Stowe. He was the eldest son of Sir Richard Temple, 3rd Baronet.

During his lifetime, the Field Marshal received three titles in the Peerage of Great Britain:

- In 1714, he was made Baron Cobham, of Cobham in the County of Kent, with remainder to heirs male of his body.
- In 1718, he was made Baron Cobham, of Cobham in the County of Kent, and Viscount Cobham, with remainder, failing heirs male of his own, to (1) his sister Hester and the heirs male of her body and failing which to (2) his third sister Christian, wife of Sir Thomas Lyttelton, 4th Baronet, of Frankley (see Baron Lyttelton), and the heirs male of her body.

Field Marshal Lord Cobham died childless in 1749, at which time the Cobham barony of 1714 became extinct. His other titles passed to different heirs: the Temple baronetcy of 1611 passed to his cousin, Sir William Temple, 5th Baronet; the barony and viscountcy of 1718 passed, according to the special remainder, to Lord Cobham's sister Hester, the widow of Richard Grenville, and her children.

=== Lord Cobham's heirs ===
==== Temple family ====
The Temple family descended from Peter Temple of Burton Dassett. It was once thought that his younger son Anthony Temple founded the Irish branch of the family from whom the Viscounts Palmerston descended. Now it is argued that Sir William Temple founder of the Irish branch descended not from the Temples of Burton Dassett but from Robert Temple of Coughton (Peter Temple of Burton Dassett’s older brother) and his descendants the Temples of Temple Hall, Leicestershire. [see Rosemary O’Day, An Elite family in early modern England: The Temples of Stowe and Burton Dassett, Woodbridge, 2018, pp. 49, 54; Elizabeth Boran, ‘William Temple’, ODNB (Oxford, 2004)] Peter Temple's elder son, John Temple, acquired the Stowe estate in Buckinghamshire. The latter's son Thomas Temple represented Andover in Parliament. On 13 December 1613 he was created a Baronet, of Stowe in the County of Buckingham, in the Baronetage of England. His son, Sir Peter Temple of Stowe (d. 1653) the second Baronet, represented Buckingham in both the Short Parliament and the Long Parliament. He was succeeded by his son, Sir Richard Temple, the third Baronet. He sat in Parliament for Warwickshire and Buckingham. His son succeeded as fourth Baronet in 1697 and received the Cobham titles in 1714 and 1718, respectively. At his death in 1749, the Temple baronetcy of 1611 passed to his second cousin William Temple, the fifth Baronet. It became dormant in 1786 on the death of the seventh Baronet.

==== Grenville family ====
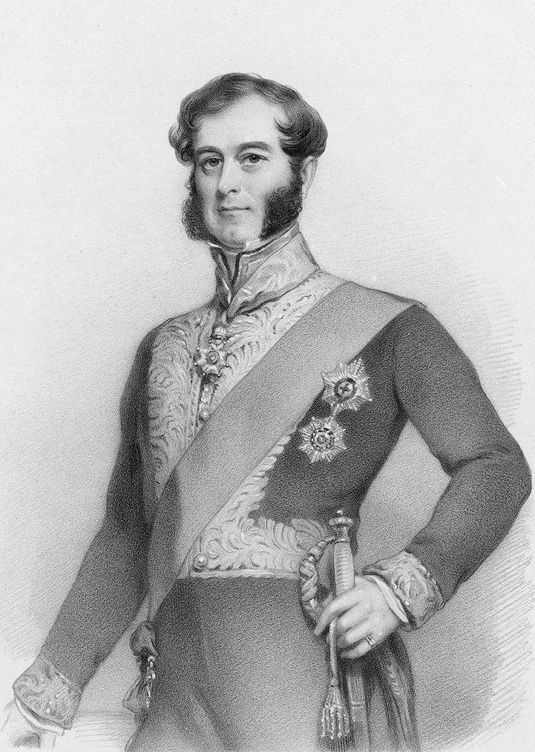
The 2nd Duke of Buckingham and Chandos

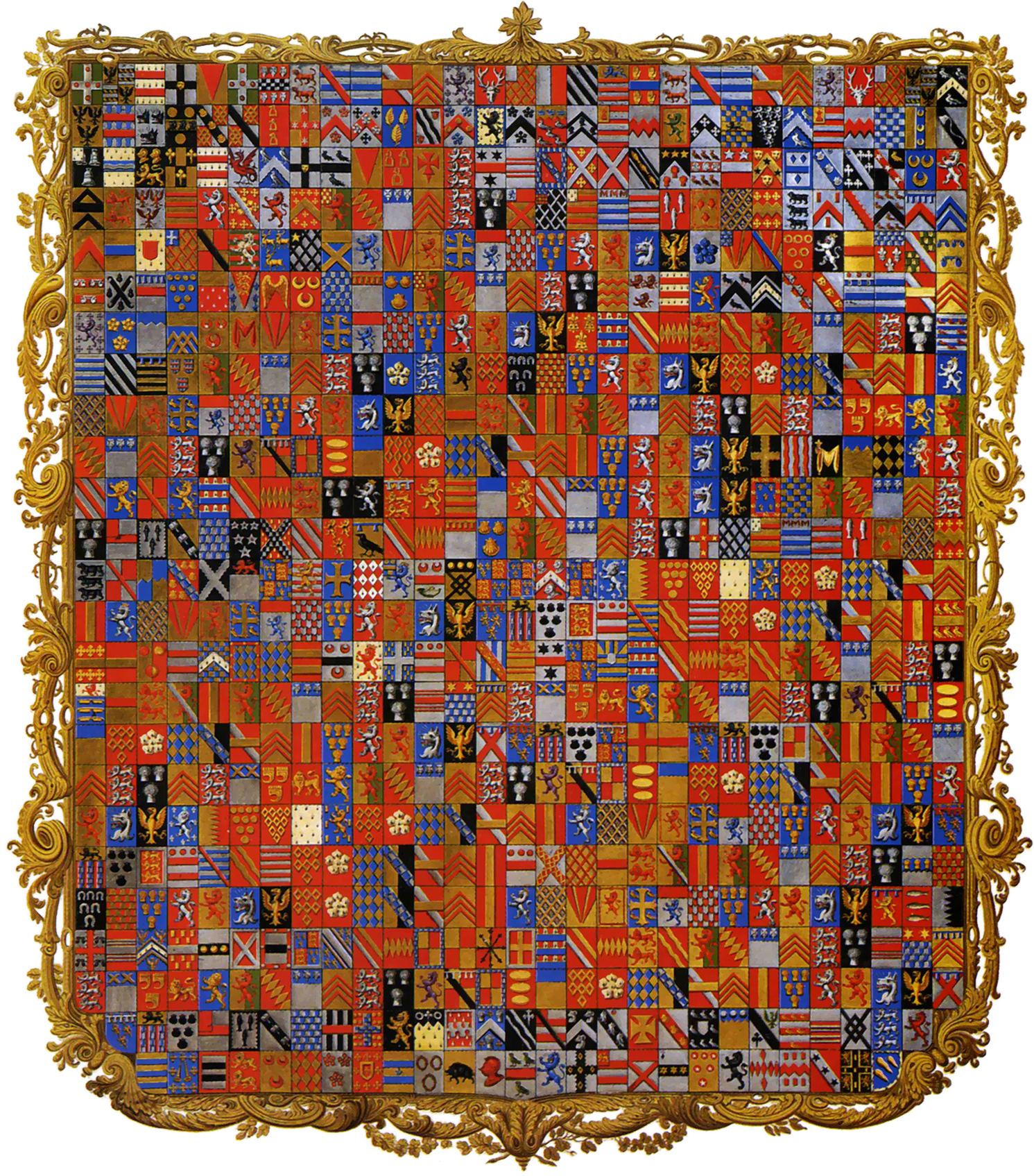
The 719 heraldic quarterings of the Temple-Nugent-Brydges-Chandos-Grenville family

The Field Marshal's barony and viscountcy of 1718 passed, according to the special remainder, to his sister Hester, the widow of Richard Grenville, and her children. In 1749, she was further created Countess Temple in the Peerage of Great Britain, with remainder to the heirs male of her body. Lady Temple's younger son was Prime Minister George Grenville. At her death, she was succeeded by her eldest son, the second Earl. He inherited the Temple estates, including Stowe House, and assumed the additional surname of Temple. He was also involved in politics and held office as First Lord of the Admiralty and as Lord Privy Seal. On his death the titles passed to his nephew, the third Earl, the son of George Grenville. He served as Lord Lieutenant of Ireland between 1782 and 1783 and 1787 and 1789. In 1784 he was created Marquess of Buckingham in the Peerage of Great Britain. Lord Buckingham married Lady Mary Nugent, daughter of Robert Nugent, 1st Earl Nugent. Mary was in 1800 created Baroness Nugent in her own right in the Peerage of Ireland, with remainder to her second son George (see the Baron Nugent). In 1788 Lord Buckingham also succeeded his father-in-law as second Earl Nugent according to a special remainder in the letters patent. He assumed by Royal licence the additional surname of Nugent at the same time.

He was succeeded by his son, the second Marquess. He served as Joint Paymaster of the Forces from 1806 to 1807. He married Lady Anne Eliza Brydges, the only child of James Brydges, 3rd Duke of Chandos (a title which became extinct on his death in 1789), and assumed by Royal licence the additional surnames of Brydges-Chandos in 1799. In 1822 Lord Buckingham was created Earl Temple of Stowe, in the County of Buckingham, Marquess of Chandos and Duke of Buckingham and Chandos, all in the Peerage of the United Kingdom. The earldom was created with remainder, failing male issue of his own, to (1) the heirs male of the body of his deceased great-grandmother Hester Grenville, 1st Countess Temple, and (2) in default thereof to his granddaughter Lady Anne Eliza Mary Temple-Nugent-Brydges-Chandos-Grenville, daughter of his son Richard, Earl Temple, who succeeded as second Duke. He was a Tory politician and served as Lord Privy Seal from 1841 to 1842.

On his death, the titles passed to his son, the third Duke. He was also a prominent politician and served as Lord President of the Council and as Secretary of State for the Colonies. In 1868 the Duke established his right to the Scottish lordship of Kinloss before the Committee for Privileges of the House of Lords. However, on his death in 1889 without male issue, the dukedom and its subsidiary titles (the marquessate of Buckingham, marquessate of Chandos, earldom of Temple and earldom of Nugent) became extinct. The lordship of Kinloss passed to his daughter Mary. The earldom of Temple of Stowe passed to his sister's son William Temple-Gore-Langton because the title had been created with a special remainder to her heirs male (see these titles for more information).

Another member of the Grenville family was Prime Minister William Wyndham Grenville, 1st Baron Grenville. He was the younger son of George Grenville and the younger brother of the first Marquess of Buckingham.

==== Lyttelton family ====
As the barony and viscountcy of Cobham could only descend to patrilineal descendants of Hester Temple or Christian Lyttelton, the wife of Sir Thomas Lyttelton, 4th Baronet, they were inherited in 1889 according to the special remainders by the 3rd Duke's distant relative Charles Lyttelton, 5th Baron Lyttelton. He was the great-great-grandson of the aforementioned Lady Christian and Sir Thomas Lyttelton, 4th Baronet. Before succeeding to his father's peerages, he had represented East Worcestershire in Parliament as a Liberal. After the 4th Baron Lyttelton's death in 1876 he had already inherited the Lyttelton Baronetcy of Frankley (1611), the Westcote barony in the Peerage of Ireland (1776) and the Lyttelton barony in the Peerage of Great Britain (1794).

The Lyttelton family seat is Hagley Hall, near Stourbridge, Worcestershire. Most owners of Hagley Hall are buried at the parish church of St John the Baptist in the adjacent Hagley Park.

Since 1889 the holders of the Lyttelton and Cobham titles have chosen to use the style of Viscount Cobham. The eighth Viscount's son, the ninth Viscount, was Lord Lieutenant of Worcestershire from 1923 to 1949. He was succeeded by his son, the tenth Viscount. He notably served as Governor-General of New Zealand from 1957 to 1962. As of 2010 the titles are held by his younger son, the 12th Viscount, who succeeded his elder brother in 2006.

== List of title holders ==
=== Temple Baronets, of Stowe (1611) ===
Escutcheon of the Temple baronets of Stowe

- Sir Thomas Temple, 1st Baronet (1567–1637)
- Sir Peter Temple, 2nd Baronet (1592–1653)
- Sir Richard Temple, 3rd Baronet (1634–1697)
- Sir Richard Temple, 4th Baronet (1669–1749) (created Viscount Cobham in 1718; see below)
- Sir William Temple, 5th Baronet (1694–1760)
- Sir Peter Temple, 6th Baronet (died 1761)
- Sir Richard Temple, 7th Baronet (1731–1786) (dormant)

=== Viscounts Cobham (1718) ===
- Richard Temple, 1st Viscount Cobham (1675–1749)
- Hester Grenville, 2nd Viscountess Cobham (c. 1690–1752) (created Countess Temple in 1749)

=== Earls Temple (1749) ===
- Hester Grenville, 1st Countess Temple, 2nd Viscountess Cobham (c. 1690–1752)
- Richard Grenville-Temple, 2nd Earl Temple, 3rd Viscount Cobham (1711–1779)
- George Nugent-Temple-Grenville, 3rd Earl Temple, 4th Viscount Cobham (1753–1813) (created Marquess of Buckingham in 1784)

=== Marquesses of Buckingham (1784) ===
- George Nugent-Temple-Grenville, 1st Marquess of Buckingham, 4th Viscount Cobham (1753–1813)
- Richard Temple-Nugent-Brydges-Chandos-Grenville, 2nd Marquess of Buckingham, 5th Viscount Cobham (1776–1839) (created Duke of Buckingham and Chandos in 1822)

=== Dukes of Buckingham and Chandos (1822) ===
- Richard Temple-Nugent-Brydges-Chandos-Grenville, 1st Duke of Buckingham and Chandos, 5th Viscount Cobham (1776–1839)
- Richard Plantagenet Temple-Nugent-Brydges-Chandos-Grenville, 2nd Duke of Buckingham and Chandos, 6th Viscount Cobham (1797–1861)
- Richard Plantagenet Campbell Temple-Nugent-Brydges-Chandos-Grenville, 3rd Duke of Buckingham and Chandos, 7th Viscount Cobham (1823–1889)

=== Viscounts Cobham (1718; reverted) ===
- Charles George Lyttelton, 8th Viscount Cobham (1842–1922)
- John Cavendish Lyttelton, 9th Viscount Cobham (1881–1949)
- Charles John Lyttelton, 10th Viscount Cobham (1909–1977)
- John William Leonard Lyttelton, 11th Viscount Cobham (1943–2006)
- Christopher Charles Lyttelton, 12th Viscount Cobham (born 1947)

The heir apparent is the present holder's son, Oliver Christopher Lyttelton (born 1976).

== Family tree ==
Family tree of the Duke of Buckingham and Chandos, Marquess of Buckingham, Marquess of Chandos, Viscount Cobham, Earl Temple, Earl Temple of Stowe, Baron Cobham, Baron Grenville, Baron Lyttelton, Baron Westcote and Temple baronets

Peter Temple
Anthony Temple	John Temple
Baronet, of Stowe, in the County of Buckingham, 1611
William Temple; 1555–1627	Thomas Temple; 1567–1637; 1st Baronet, of Stowe	Alexander Temple; 1583–1629
Baronet, of Frankley, in the County of Worcester, 1618
John Temple; 1600–1677	Peter Temple; 1592–1653; 2nd Baronet, of Stowe	John Temple; 1593–1632	James Temple; 1606–1680	Thomas Lyttelton; 1593–1650; 1st Baronet, of Frankley
Baronet, of Stowe, in the County of Buckingham, 1662
Thomas Temple; 1613/14–1674; 1st Baronet, of Stowe	Peter Temple; 1613–1660	Henry Lyttelton; 1624–1693; 2nd Baronet, of Frankley	Charles Lyttelton; 1628–1716; 3rd Baronet, of Frankley
Baronetcy of Stowe (1662 creation) extinct, 1674
John Temple; 1632–1705	Richard Temple; 1634–1697; 3rd Baronet, of Stowe	Eleanor Temple d. 1729 m. Richard Grenville	William Temple d. 1706
Viscount Palmerston and Baron Temple, of Mount Temple in the County of Sligo, 1723	Baron Cobham, of Cobham in the County of Kent (6th creation), 1714; Viscount Cobham and Baron Cobham, of Cobham in the County of Kent (7th creation), 1718	Earl Temple, 1749
Henry Temple c. 1673–1757; 1st Viscount Palmerston and Baron Temple	Richard Temple; 1675–1749; 1st Viscount Cobham, etc., 4th Baronet, of Stowe	Hester Grenville c. 1690–1752; 1st Countess Temple, 2nd Viscountess Cobham and 2nd Baroness Cobham	Richard Grenville; 1678–1727	Christian Temple	Thomas Lyttelton; 1686–1751; 4th Baronet, of Frankley	William Temple; 1694–1760; 5th Baronet, of Stowe	Peter Temple d. 1761; 6th Baronet, of Stowe
Barony of Cobham (1714 creation) extinct, 1749
Henry, Lord Temple	Richard Temple; 1731–1786; 7th Baronet, of Stowe
Baron Lyttelton (1st creation), 1756	Baron Westcote, 1776; Baron Lyttelton (2nd creation), 1794	Baronetcy of Stowe dormant, 1786
Henry Temple; 1739–1802; 2nd Viscount Palmerston and Baron Temple	Richard Grenville-Temple; 1711–1779; 2nd Earl Temple, 3rd Viscount Cobham, etc.	George Grenville; 1712–1770	Hester Grenville; 1720–1803; Baroness Chatham m. William Pitt the Elder, Earl of Chatham and Viscount Pitt	George Lyttelton; 1709–1773; 1st Baron Lyttelton, 5th Baronet, of Frankley	William Henry Lyttelton; 1724–1808; 1st Baron Lyttelton
Marquess of Buckingham (2nd creation), 1784	Baron Grenville, of Wotton under Bernewood in the County of Buckingham, 1790
George Nugent-Temple-Grenville; 1753–1813; 1st Marquess of Buckingham, 3rd Earl Temple, 2nd Earl Nugent, 4th Viscount Cobham, etc.	William Wyndham Grenville; 1759–1834; 1st Baron Grenville	William Pitt the Younger; 1759–1806	Thomas Lyttelton; 1744–1779; 2nd Baron Lyttelton, 5th Baronet, of Frankley
Barony of Grenville extinct, 1834	Barony of Lyttelton and Baronetcy of Frankley extinct, 1779
Duke of Buckingham and Chandos, Marquess of Chandos and Earl Temple of Stowe, 1822
Henry John Temple; 1784–1865; 3rd Viscount Palmerston and Baron Temple	Richard Temple-Nugent-Brydges-Chandos-Grenville; 1776–1839; 1st Duke of Buckingham and Chandos, Marquess of Chandos, and Earl Temple of Stowe, 2nd Marquess of Buckingham, 3rd Earl Nugent, 4th Earl Temple, 5th Viscount Cobham, etc.	George Fulke Lyttelton; 1763–1828; 2nd Baron Lyttelton	William Henry Lyttelton; 1782–1837; 3rd Baron Lyttelton
Richard Plantagenet Temple-Nugent-Brydges-Chandos-Grenville; 1797–1861; 2nd Duke of Buckingham and Chandos, Marquess of Chandos, and Earl Temple of Stowe, 3rd Marquess of Buckingham, 4th Earl Nugent, 6th Viscount Cobham, etc.
Richard Plantagenet Campbell Temple-Nugent-Brydges-Chandos-Grenville; 1823–1889; 3rd Duke of Buckingham and Chandos, Marquess of Chandos, and Earl Temple of Stowe, 4th Marquess of Buckingham, 5th Earl Nugent, 6th Earl Temple, 7th Viscount Cobham, etc.	Anna Eliza Mary (Temple-Nugent-Brydges-Chandos-Grenville) Gore-Langton; 1820–1879	William Henry Powell Gore-Langton; 1824–1873	George William Lyttelton; 1817–1876; 4th Baron Lyttelton
Dukedom of Buckingham and Chandos, Marquessates of Buckingham and Chandos, and the Earldoms of Temple (1st creation) and of Nugent extinct, 1889
William Stephen Temple-Gore-Langton; 1847–1902; 4th Earl Temple of Stowe	Charles George Lyttelton; 1842–1922; 8th Viscount Cobham, etc.
Algernon William Stephen Temple-Gore-Langton; 1871–1940; 5th Earl Temple of Stowe	Chandos Graham Temple-Gore-Langton; 1873–1921	Evelyn Arthur Grenville Temple-Gore-Langton; 1884–1972	John Cavendish Lyttelton; 1881–1949; 9th Viscount Cobham, etc.
Chandos Grenville Temple-Gore-Langton; 1909–1966; 6th Earl Temple of Stowe	Ronald Stephen Brydges Temple-Gore-Langton; 1910–1988; 7th Earl Temple of Stowe	Walter Grenville Algernon Temple-Gore-Langton; 1924–2013; 8th Earl Temple of Stowe	Charles John Lyttelton; 1909–1977; 10th Viscount Cobham, etc.
James Grenville Temple-Gore-Langton b. 1955; 9th Earl Temple of Stowe	John William Leonard Lyttelton; 1943–2006; 11th Viscount Cobham, etc.	Christopher Charles Lyttelton b. 1947; 12th Viscount Cobham, etc.
Rowan Caradoc Temple-Gore-Langton b. 1987	Oliver Christopher Lyttelton b. 1976
Heir apparent to the Earl Temple of Stowe	Heir apparent to the Viscount Cobham

== See also ==
- Marquess of Buckingham
- Duke of Buckingham
- Duke of Chandos
- Earl Temple of Stowe
- Lady Kinloss
- Baron Grenville
- Earl Nugent
- Viscount Palmerston
- Baron Lyttelton
- Viscount Chandos
- Temple baronets
- Baron Cobham

=== References ===
Secondary sources

- Kidd, Charles; Williamson, David (1990). Debrett's Peerage and Baronetage. New York: St Martin's Press.
- Mosley, Charles (1999). Burke's Peerage (106th ed.).
- Mosley, Charles (2003). Burke's Peerage and Baronetage (107th ed.).
- Hesilrige, Arthur G. M. (1921). Debrett's Peerage and Titles of courtesy. London: London: Dean & son, limited. pp. 149, 222.

Baronetage of England
Preceded by Bayning baronets	Temple baronets 24 September 1611	Succeeded by Penyston baronets
