= St George's School, Birmingham =

St George's School Edgbaston

Location
- 31 Calthorpe Road; Birmingham, B15 1RX; England; 52.4681°N 1.9210°W

Information
- Type: Private day school
- Established: 1999 (merger)
- Local authority: Birmingham
- Department for Education URN: 103564 Tables
- Head teacher: Luke Nicholls
- Executive headteacher: Gary Neal
- Staff: 100
- Gender: Coeducational
- Age: 3 to 18
- Enrolment: 359
- School fees: £1,825 to £3,675 per term
- Website: http://www.sgse.co.uk

St George's School Edgbaston is a non-selective private day school in Edgbaston, Birmingham, England for girls and boys aged 11 to 18. It is located near St George's Church and consists of a lower school, an upper school and a sixth form.

== History ==
St George's School was founded as a charitable trust in 1999 as a result of the merger of two schools: Edgbaston Church of England College for Girls, founded in 1886 and Edgbaston College Preparatory School, founded at the end of the nineteenth century. The school is situated one mile from the centre of Birmingham and occupies a six-acre site.

The school has a Christian foundation which aims to embrace Christian values in everything the students do. Its ethos statement recognises that the school community reflects the multi-cultural diversity of Birmingham and that this has a significant influence on the way the school applies its Christian values.

== School Organisation ==
It is divided into the lower school, including the Early Years Foundation Stage (EYFS) for the youngest children, and the upper school, including the sixth form.
