= Andrews baronets =

Set index for Andrews baronets

There have been four baronetcies created for persons with the surname Andrews, two in the Baronetage of England, one in the Baronetage of Great Britain and one in the Baronetage of the United Kingdom. All four creations are extinct.

- Andrews baronets of Doddington (1641)
- Andrews baronets of Lathbury (1661)
- Andrews baronets of Shaw Place (1766)
- Andrews baronets of Comber (1942): see Sir James Andrews, 1st Baronet (1877–1951)
