= Sir Thomas Penyston, 1st Baronet =

English peer (1591-1644)

Sir Thomas Penyston, Bt
- Born: c. 1591; Rochester
- Died: c. 1644; Cornwall, Oxfordshire
- Spouse(s): Martha Temple 1611; Elizabeth Watson; Anne Stonhouse
- Parent(s): Thomas Penistone/Penyston; Mary Sommer

Sir Thomas Penyston, 1st Baronet (c. 1591–1644) was a 17th-century member of the gentry who received one of the first baronetcies. In 1637 he was sheriff of Oxfordshire and in 1640, he was a member of parliament for Westbury.

== Early life ==
Sir Thomas Penyston (or Penistone) was the eldest son of Thomas Penyston (or Penistone) and Mary Sommer or Somers, a daughter of John Sommer and Martine Ridge. His parents had married in 1590 at St Bride's, Fleet Street. Thomas was a wealthy wool merchant living in Rochester, but with access to London. Mary belonged to a prominent Rochester family. They lived in the parish of St Margaret's in a house that his mother had inherited from her father. Thomas had a younger brother and two younger sisters.

There is a surviving portrait of Thomas and his mother, which was painted in 1598. The portrait was painted by Robert Peake the elder, one of the country's leading portrait painters. In Peake's portrait, Thomas is standing beside his mother wearing a silver costume. She is wearing a brown dress with a large white ruff and an ornate necklace. Her hand rests on the shoulder of her seven-year-old son, The portrait is about three feet by two and in the top left hand corner, there is a representation of the coats of arms of both the Sommer and Penyston/Penistone families. Thomas' portrait is now at Leeds Castle, in the "Henry VIII’s banqueting hall" and is illustrated and described in the guide book.

Thomas; father died around 1601 when his intensely religious will was proved. Thomas inherited the residue of his father's estate. Thomas' mother, Mary received some money and also her jewels, including chains of gold and pearls together with a "greate dyamond" that had belonged to her father. She also received the various household effects that had previously belonged to her father. Thomas Penistone senior asked to be buried in the Cathedral at Rochester. At one time, there was a memorial there to him, but it was apparently destroyed during the Civil War.

In 1602, his mother married Sir Alexander Temple. The next few years saw the birth of two half-brothers (including James Temple the regicide) and a half-sister, but in 1607, his mother died. It is likely that she was buried in the cathedral at Rochester since a later visitor noted a memorial to her, although this no longer remains. Following his mother's death, his stepfather moved to Chadwell St Mary in Essex.

On 13 March 1606/7 he matriculated at Queen's College, Oxford (aged 15), receiving a BA degree from St Edmund Hall on 16 June 1609.

== Marriage to Martha Temple ==
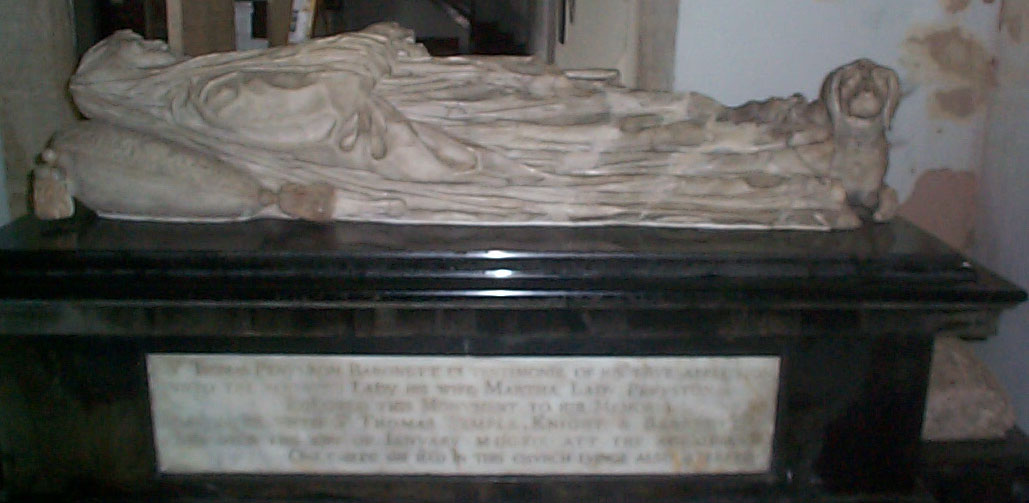
The memorial to sir Thomas Penyston (Penistone)'s first wife, Martha, in Stowe church

At the time of his mother's death, Thomas was studying at Oxford University.

In 1609, he entered the Inner Temple to study the common law. In 1611, shortly after moving to Chadwell, Sir Alexander was able to recover the manor of Leigh (in Iden in the county of Sussex) on behalf of his stepson.

This manor had previously belonged to Thomas' grandfather. Sir Alexander also helped Thomas in his claim for land in Wales. This had been owned by Richard Powell and subsequently passed to Richard's son John Powell who sold it to Thomas Penistone's grandfather. The position was complicated by the fact that John Powell had been underage at the time of his father's death. Legally, he should have been made a ward of the Crown, but this does not seem to have happened. Alexander obtained a warrant from Robert Cecil to deal "impartially" with the matter.

The restoration of Thomas' property may have been part of a marriage settlement since in the same year, Thomas Penistone married Sir Alexander's niece (Martha) and would have needed some property to contribute. Martha was the daughter of Sir Thomas Temple and was described as "a dainte fine lady".

In the same year, Thomas received a baronetcy - perhaps paid for by his father-in-law who received his own baronetcy at the same date. Hester, the daughter of Sir Thomas and Martha Penistone, was born the year after their marriage, but died shortly after.

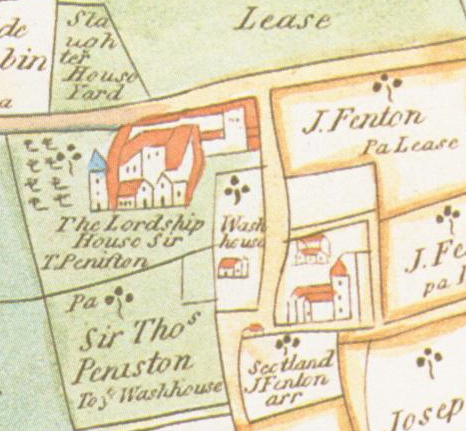
An early map showing Sir Thomas Penistone's occupation of Bruce Castle (then called Lordship House)

Sir Thomas Penistone was among thirty gentlemen in the retinue of Richard Sackville, 3rd Earl of Dorset - "one of the seventeenth century’s most accomplished gamblers and wastrels". The members of the Earl's retinue each received fifty pounds per year.

Sir Thomas and Martha lived in Bruce Castle in Tottenham, leased from the Earl and they attended social functions hosted by the Earl. Around 1619, Martha became the Earl's mistress.

Martha died of smallpox in January 1620 and she was buried in the Temple's parish church at Stowe. Her father built a magnificent marble monument to her in Stowe church. This can still be seen in the "Penyston chapel" in Stowe church.

== Subsequent career ==
Sir Thomas Penistone travelled abroad for a while and subsequently settled in Cornwell, Oxfordshire, and sometime after 1622, he married again, to Elizabeth Watson, daughter of Sir Thomas Watson and widow of Sir William Pope. His stepson by this marriage inherited the title Earl of Downe in 1631, becoming Thomas Pope, 2nd Earl of Downe. He claimed that Sir Thomas bullied him into marrying his guardian's daughter - Lucy Dutton.

Sir Thomas married a third time to Anne, the fourth daughter of Sir William Stonhouse, 1st Bart. of Radley. A son by her died in infancy.

In 1633, Sir Thomas acted as the trustee for his half-sister (Susan Thornhurst, née Temple) in the marriage settlement when Susan married Sir Martin Lister (the father of Martin Lister, the biologist).

In 1636, Sir Thomas was one of the members of the gentry who initially refused to pay the ship tax. Nonetheless, he was chosen as High Sheriff of Oxfordshire the following year. In 1640, he was chosen as member of the Short Parliament for Westbury, but was not elected to the Long Parliament.

He died around 1644, when the title passed to his son Thomas. The second Thomas died in 1674 when the title passed to his son, a third Thomas. He died in 1679 and the title passed to his brother, Fairmeadow. The title became extinct in 1705 with the death of Sir Fairmeadow. The family continued to occupy Cornwell House into the 19th century and the building (now called Cornwell Manor) still contains an 18th-century stone fireplace with Penyston family coat-of-arms.

Parliament of England
Vacant Parliament suspended since 1629	Member of Parliament for Westbury; 1640; With: John Ashe	Succeeded by Sir William Wheler, Bt; John Ashe
Baronetage of England
New creation	Baronet (of Leigh and subsequently Cornwell); 1611 – c.1644	Succeeded by Thomas Penistone
