= Susanna Lister =

English natural history illustrator

- Born: 1670; Carleton-in-Craven
- Died: 8 March 1738 (aged 67–68); Bekesbourne
- Other names: Susanna Knowler
- Occupation: illustrator
- Known for: illustrating shells
- Spouse: Gilbert Knowler
- Children: one

Susanna Lister or Susanna Knowler (c. 1670 – 8 March 1738) was a British natural history illustrator and engraver who with her sister, Anne Lister created over 1,000 shell illustrations.

== Life ==
Lister was born in Carleton-in-Craven and baptised in 1670. She had a younger sister Anne Lister and six other siblings. Her parents were Helen and Martin Lister. She was born at Carleton Hall although her father had a residence in York.

By the time she was eleven her polymath father was allowing her and her sister to experiment with oil paint but he prevented them from doing any serious limning until her had given them instruction.

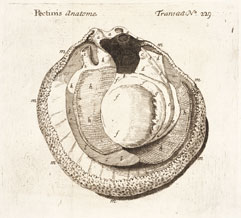
Historiae Conchyliorum, illustration by Susanna Lister

Her father had a large collection of seashells and they would learn how to draw these accurately. Martin Lister published a book of shell illustrations titled "De cochleis" and some of the illustrations are marked with "AL pni." and "SL" as attribution. Their drawings were etched in Oxford. They were some of the first women to use a microscope. Susanna and her sister's work was used by their father because he considered that the best engravers were not equally reliable. The illustrations were thought to be essential by her father as he wanted them to distract observers from his interest in molluscs. He was a physician and he worried that his interests may be seen as eccentric.

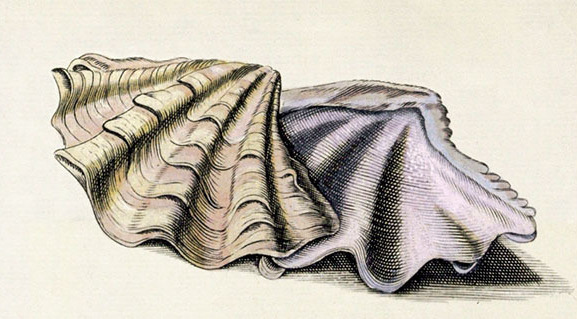
Shell watercolour pictures by Anna and Susanna Lister are in the Bodleian Library

In 1685 Martin Lister published the first two volumes of his four volume book with the ambition of illustrating every shell. The books would included 1062 illustrations that were the work of Susanna or her sister. The books were a systemic study of what would become conchology. Edward Lhwyd noted the enormous amount of work that the sisters donated to the task over some years. Women involved in scientific illustration at this time was unusual. Maria Sibylla Merian (and her daughters) are rare examples of others.

In 1706 or 1707 she became the third wife of Gilbert Knowler who was about seven years older than her. They had a daughter, also called Susanna Knowler.

Lister died in Bekesbourne. Her legacy is the illustrations and engravings that she created. It was believed that the copper plates were lost but her biographer, Anna Marie Roos, found that they were safely stored in the Bodleian Library. Roos believes that one of the copper plates may be the oldest extant that were used for the Philosophical Transactions as all the similar plates were given as scrap during the shortages of World War One.
