= Anne Lister (illustrator) =

English natural history illustrator

- Born: 1671; York
- Died: c.1700
- Known for: illustration
- Parent: Martin Lister

Anne Lister or Anna Lister (1671–c. 1700) was an English natural history illustrator. She and her sister, Susanna Lister, were employed and trained by her father Martin Lister. She is considered to be among the "first female scientific illustrators to use a microscope."

== Life ==
Anne (also known as Anna and Nancy) was born to Helen Lister and physician and Royal Society member Martin Lister in 1671 in York.

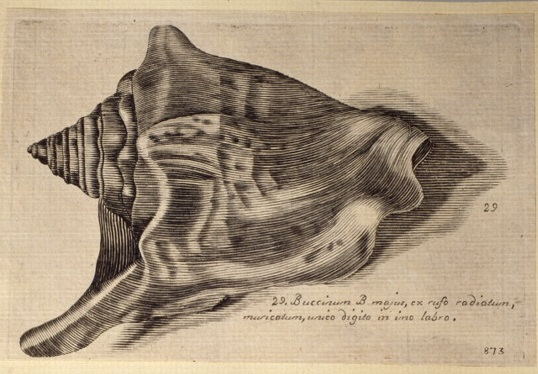
Sketch of Strombis tricornis by Anne Lister for her father's book

Anna's training began when she was young, as letters exist from her father to her mother in which he notes that he is sending his daughters, Anna and Susanna Lister, art materials. He says that they should not use them until they have been shown the correct way to use them.

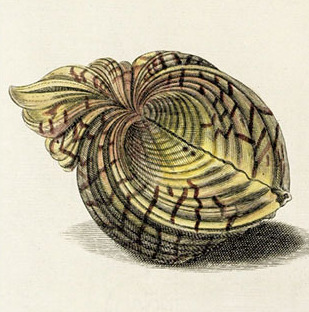
Shell watercolour picture by Anna or Susanna Lister in the Bodleian Library

Anna did some illustrations for her father to present to the Philosophical Transactions. As a result, she is now considered to be "among the first female scientific illustrators to use a microscope". Her father published De cochleis ("On Snails"), which included illustrations signed by Anna and her sister. In 1685, the first version of her father's work Historia conchyliorum ("History of Shells") was published with over 1,000 plates. The plates are thought to date from three years' work from 1685 to 1688. Their father put the value of their illustrations as $2000. Because the text of Lister's book was applied directly onto the copper plates it was possible for the Lister family to create the book. Anna and her sisters work was used by their father because he considered the best engravers to be less reliable. The illustrations were thought to be essential for the book as Anna's father wanted them to distract critics from his interest in molluscs. He was a physician and he worried that his interest in shells would be seen as eccentric.

Anna's legacy includes the illustrations and engravings that she constructed. The engravings were used in reprints and many of the original watercolours are extant at the Bodleian Library in Oxford. It was believed that the copper plates were lost but her biographer, Anna Marie Roos, found that they were safely stored in the Bodleian. Roos believes that one of the copper plates may be the oldest extant of those that were used for the Philosophical Transactions, as all the similar plates were given as scrap during the shortages of World War One.
