= Thornhurst baronets =

Arms of Thornhurst of Agnes Court

The Thornhurst Baronetcy, of Agnes Court in the County of Kent, was a title in the Baronetage of England. It was created on 13 December 1622 for Gifford Thornhurst, the son of William Thornhurst (1575–1606) and Anne (died 1633), daughter of Thomas Howard, 1st Viscount Howard of Bindon. Thornhurst was the first husband of Susanna Temple. The title became extinct on his death in 1627. He was buried at Allington, Kent.

== Thornhurst baronets, of Agnes Court(1622) ==
- Sir Gifford Thornhurst, 1st Baronet (1598–1627)
