= Penyston baronets =

Extinct baronetcy in the Baronetage of England

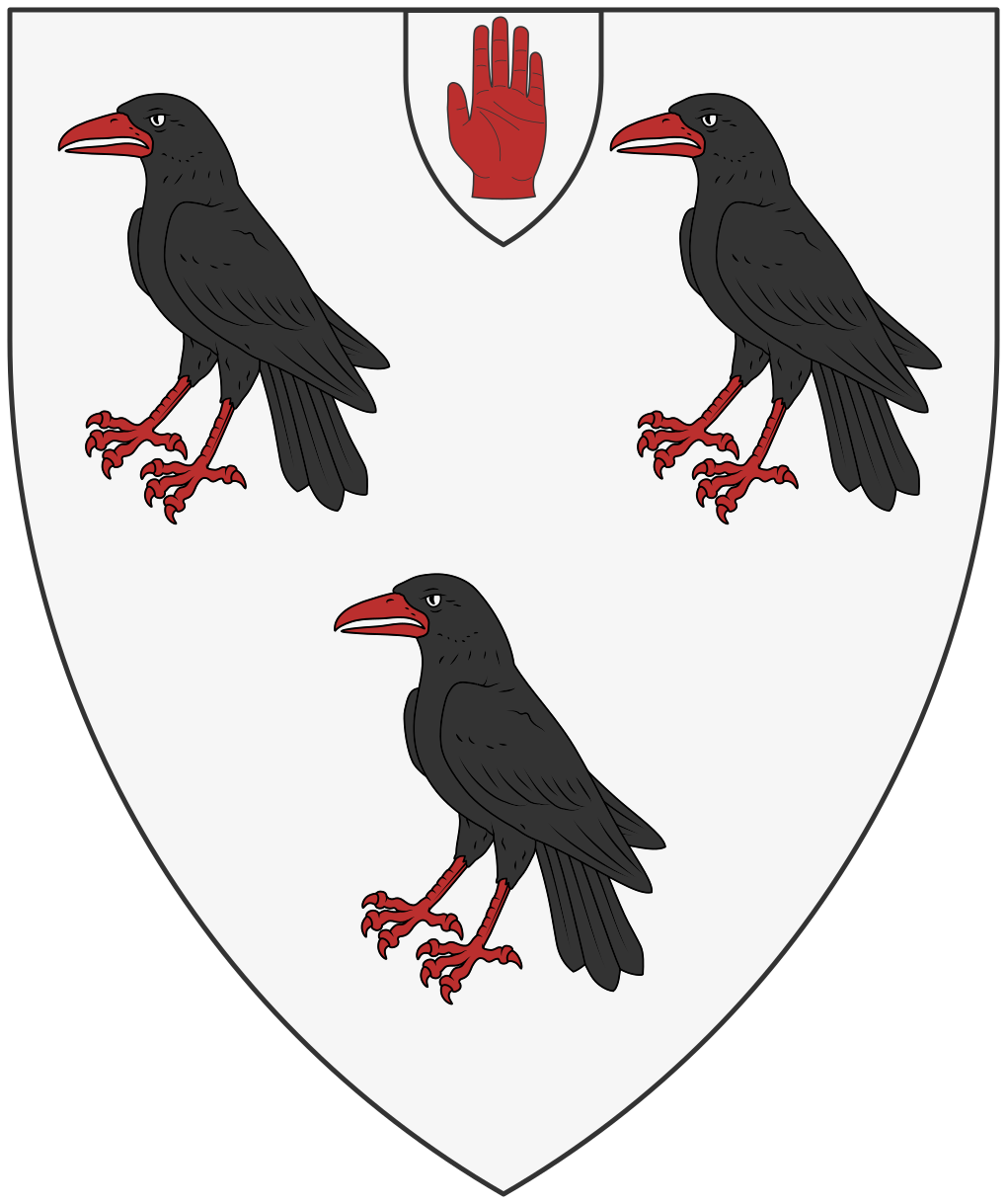
The coat of arms of the Penyston baronets.

The Penyston Baronetcy, of Leigh (in Iden in the county of Sussex), was a title in the Baronetage of England. It was created on 24 September 1611 for Thomas Penyston, subsequently High Sheriff of Oxfordshire and member of parliament for Westbury. Penyston was the son-in-law of Sir Thomas Temple who received his baronetcy on the same day. The title became extinct on the death of the fourth Baronet in 1705.

== Penyston baronets, of Leigh (1611) ==
- Sir Thomas Penyston, 1st Baronet (c. 1592–1642)
- Sir Thomas Penyston, 2nd Baronet (died 1674)
- Sir Thomas Penyston, 3rd Baronet (c. 1648– c. 1679)
- Sir Fairmedow Penyston, 4th Baronet (1656–1705)

Baronetage of England
Preceded by Temple baronets	Penyston baronets 24 September 1611	Succeeded by Devereux baronets
