= Matthew Lister =

Matthew Lister may refer to:

- Matthew Lister (canoeist)
- Matthew Lister (physician)
