= Martin Lister =

English naturalist and physician (1639–1712)

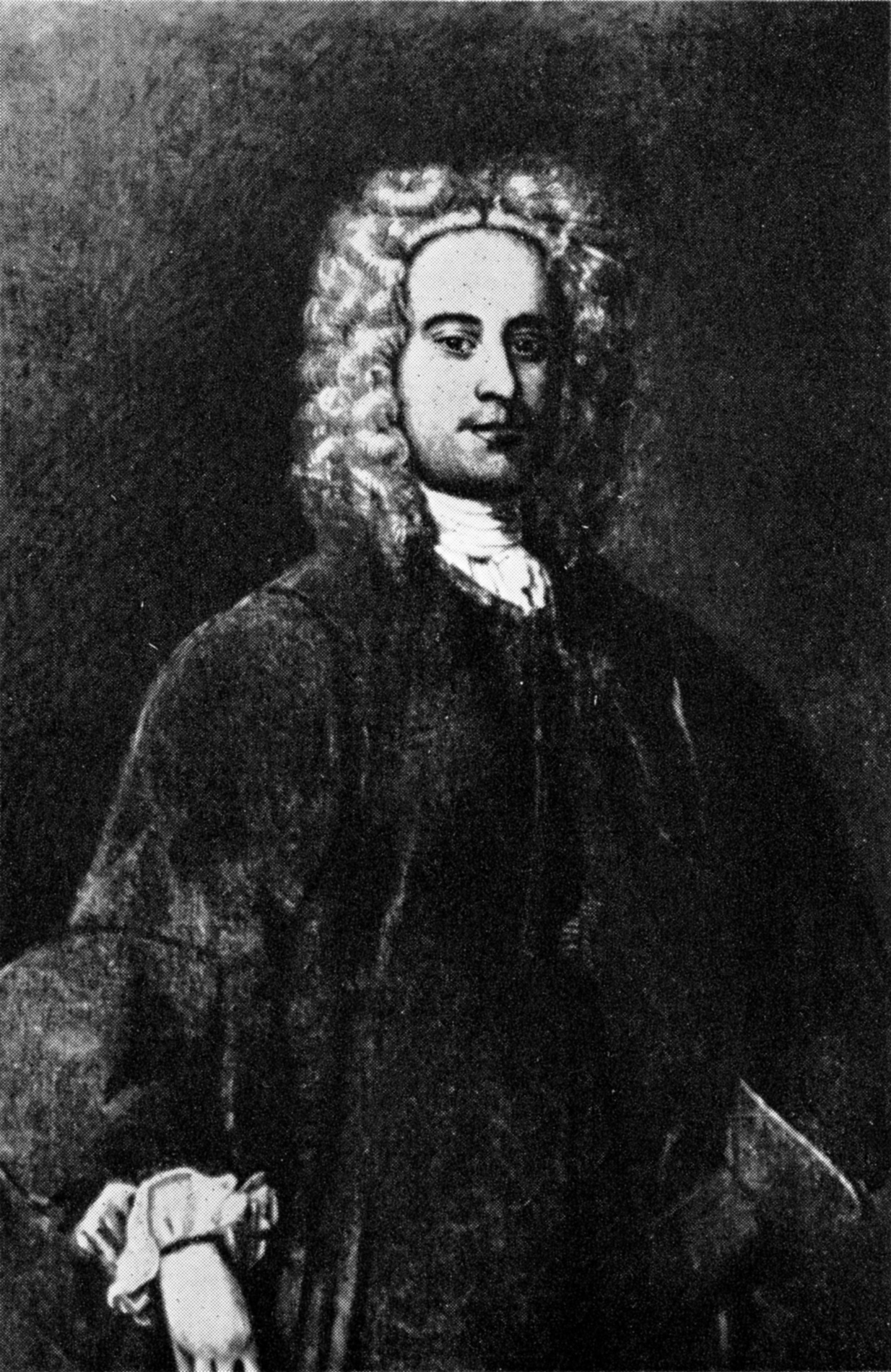
- Born: 12 April 1639; Radcliffe, Buckinghamshire
- Died: 2 February 1712 (aged 72); Epsom, Surrey
- Resting place: Clapham Church
- Citizenship: British
- Education: St John's, Cambridge
- Scientific career
- Fields: Physician and naturalist

Martin Lister FRS (12 April 1639 – 2 February 1712) was an English naturalist and physician. His daughters Anne and Susanna were two of his illustrators and engravers.

== Life ==
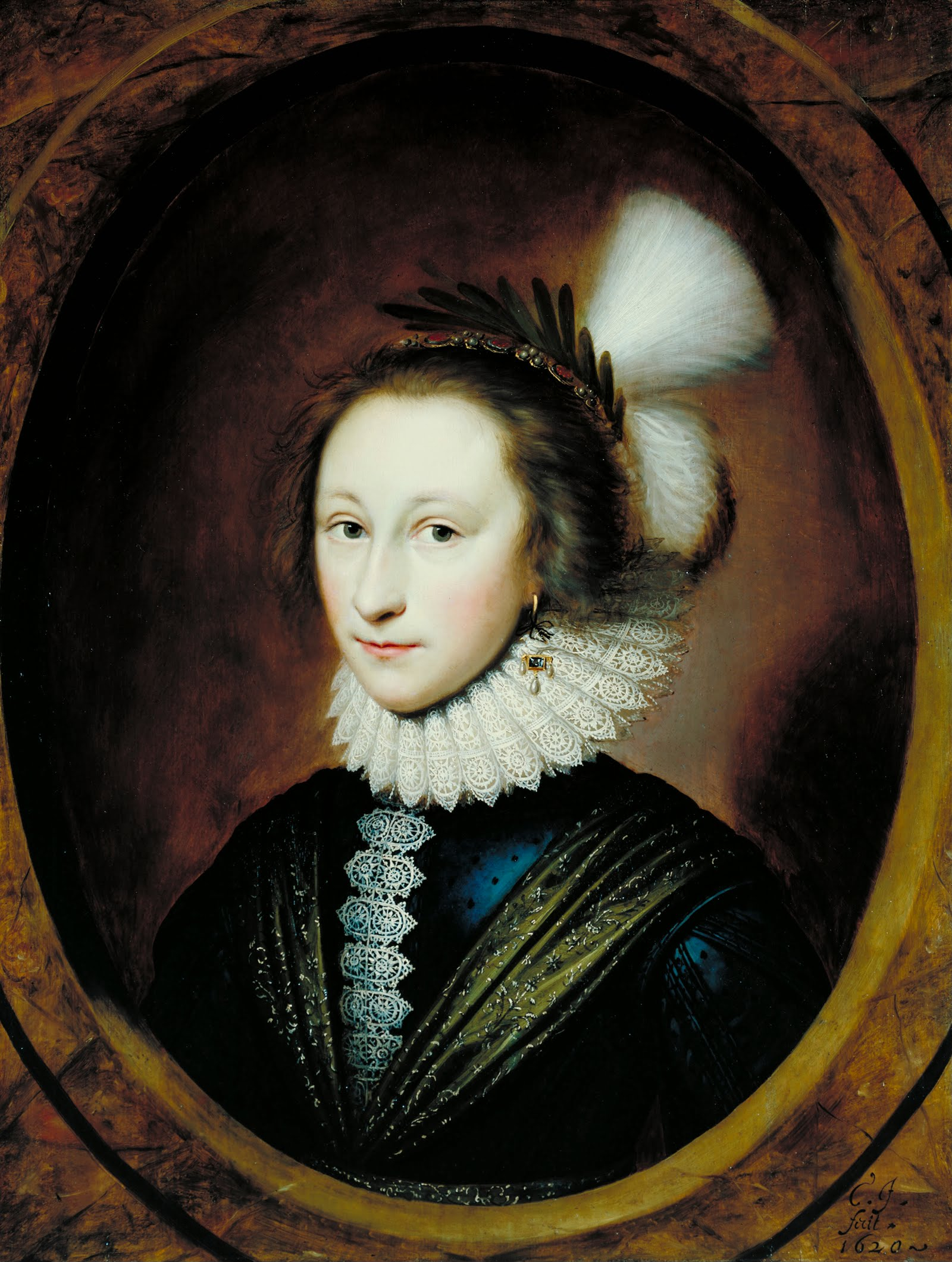
Lister's mother, Susan (or Susanna) Temple, later Lady Lister (1620), by Cornelius Johnson.

Lister was born at Radcliffe, near Buckingham, the son of Sir Martin Lister MP for Brackley in the Long Parliament and his wife Susanna Temple, a daughter of Sir Alexander Temple. Lister was connected to a number of well known individuals. He was the nephew of both James Temple and also of Matthew Lister, physician to Anne, queen of James I, and to Charles I. He was also the uncle of Sarah Churchill, Duchess of Marlborough who corresponded with him throughout her life.

Lister was educated at Melton Mowbray, Leicestershire under Mr Barwick and matriculated at St John's College, Cambridge in 1658. He graduated in 1658/9, and was elected a fellow in 1660. In 1668 he travelled to France to study as a physician and settled at York in 1670 to practice medicine. He became Fellow of the Royal Society on 2 November 1671. He practised medicine at York until 1683, when he moved to London. In 1684 he received the degree of M.D. at Oxford on the recommendation of the Chancellor. In 1687 became F.R.C.P.

Lister bought Carlton Hall in Craven in the West Riding of Yorkshire. He attended the Earl of Portland when he was ambassador to France in 1698.

He was physician to Queen Anne from 1709 until his death. He died at Epsom at the age of 72 and was buried at Clapham Church. He bequeathed his books and copper-plates to the University of Oxford.

Lister was a prolific correspondent. More than 2,000 letters written by and to him survive in the Bodleian Library, Oxford and other repositories. They are to and from a variety of people including family, friends and other scientists. Abstracts of these letters have been published online.

== Memorial inscription ==
The memorial inscription for Lister in Clapham church is now lost. It read:

Near this place is buried the body of
MARTIN LISTER,
Doctor of Physick, a Member of the
Royal Society, and one of
Queen Ann's Physicians,
who departed this life,
the second day of
February 1711–12.

== Scientific work ==
Lister contributed numerous articles on natural history, medicine and antiquities to the Philosophical Transactions. He was the first arachnologist and conchologist, and provided an unprecedented picture of a seventeenth-century virtuoso. Lister is recognized for his discovery of ballooning spiders and as the father of conchology, but it is less well known that he invented the histogram, provided Newton with alloys, and donated the first significant natural history collections to the Ashmolean Museum in Oxford. Just as Lister was the first to make a systematic study of spiders and their webs, this biography is the first to analyze the significant webs of knowledge, patronage, and familial and gender relationships that governed his life as a scientist and physician. His principal works were Historiae animalium Angliae tres tractatus (1678) which was the first organised, systematic publication on shells; Historiae Conchyliorum (1685 1692), and Conchyliorum Bivalvium (1696). As a conchologist he was held in high esteem, but while he recognised the similarity of fossil mollusca to living forms, he regarded them as inorganic imitations produced in the rocks. Lister employed his daughters from an early age. His daughters, Anne Lister, and Susanna Lister were both credited as his illustrators and engravers.

In 1683 he communicated to the Royal Society (1684), an ingenious proposal for a new sort of maps of countries; together with tables of sands and clays, such as are chiefly found in the north parts of England. In this essay he suggested the preparation of a soil or mineral map of the country, and thereby is justly credited with being the first to realise the importance of a geological survey.

Charles Lyell speaks of Lister in his Principles of Geology as follows:

Dr. Plot, in his 'Natural History of Oxfordshire.' (1677) attributed to a 'plastic virtue latent in the earth' the origin of fossil shells and fishes; and Lister, to his accurate account of British shells, in 1678, added the fossil species, under the appellation of turbinated and bivalve stones. 'Either,' said he, 'these were terriginous, or if otherwise, the animals they so exactly represent have become extinct. This writer appears to have been the first who was aware of the continuity over large districts of the principal groups of strata in the British series, and who proposed the construction of regular geological maps.

He was a benefactor of the Ashmolean Museum in Oxford. The ridge Dorsa Lister in the Sea of Serenity on the Moon was named after him.

== Collections ==
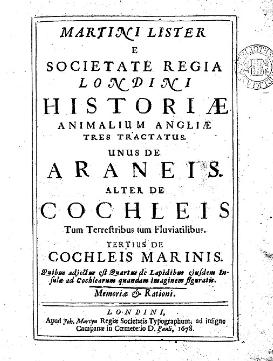
Title Page of Martin Lister's Historiae Animalium Angliae (1678), from Digital Bodleian

Before he died in 1712, Lister donated over a thousand books and manuscripts to the Ashmolean Museum, most of which were medical and scientific works. In 1769 John Fothergill gifted the Ashmolean several volumes of Lister's letters and around 40 of his notebooks, which he had bought at auction.

In 1858 the Trustees of the Museum offered a transfer of their written artefacts to the Bodleian, and in 1860 more than 3700 volumes were received by the Library. Lister's books and manuscripts form almost a third of this initial collection, making him its second-most represented donor next to Elias Ashmole. His series consists of c. 1260 volumes dating from the 16th to 18th centuries, their topics ranging through medicine, anatomy, natural philosophy, and botany, as well as into voyages and travel.

== Publications ==
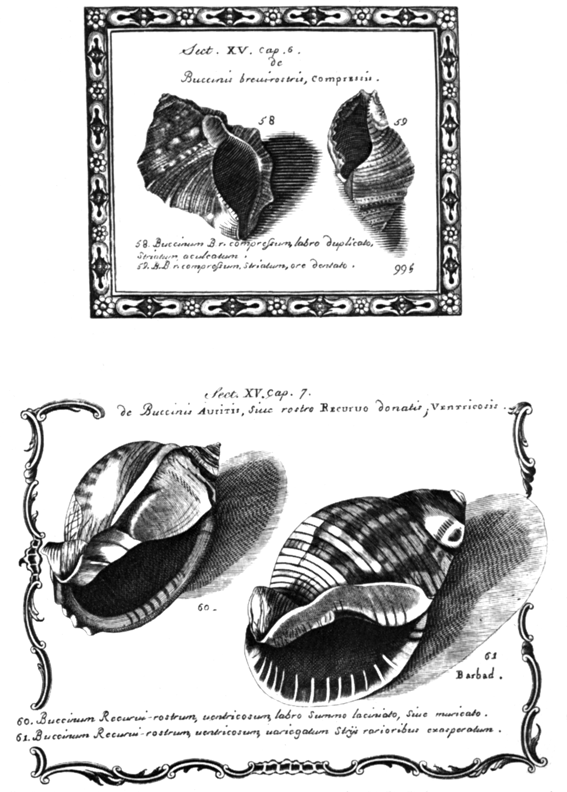
Plate from Historiae Conchyliorum (1691).

- Histories Animalium Angliae tres tractatus, &ct,, 1678.
- Goedartii Historia Insectorum cum notis, 1682.
- De Fontibus medicinalibus Angliae,,, 1682.
- Historiae Conchyliorum, 1685
- Exercitatio Anatomica, in qua de Cochlcis agitur, 1694.
- Exercitatio anatomica, in qua de cochleis, maxime terrestribus et limacibus, agitur (in Latin). London: Samuel Smith & Benjamin Walford. 1694.
- Cochlearum ct Linacum exercitatio Anatomica,,, 1695.
- Conchyliorum bivalvium utriusque aquae exercitatio anatomica tertia (in Latin). London. 1696.
- Exercitationes Medicinales, &tc,,. 1697.
- Journey to Paris, c. 1699

== See also ==
- Susanna Lister, Anne Lister
- Historia animalium by Conrad Gessner

== Sources ==
- Dr. Martin Lister: A bibliography by Geoffrey Keynes. (Includes illustrations by Lister's wife and daughter). Published by St Paul's Bibliographies (UK) with an ISBN 0-906795-04-4
