= Edward Eversfield =

Member of the Parliament of England

Edward Eversfield (c. 1618 – c. 1676) was an English courtier and politician who sat in the House of Commons from 1660 to 1661.

Eversfield was the son of Nicholas Eversfield of The Grove, Hollington.

Eversfield was Member of Parliament (MP) for Bramber from 1660 to 1661. In 1660 he became a Gentleman of the Privy Chamber and a J.P. He was commissioner for assessment in Sussex from 1660 to 1663, for Surrey from 1664 to 1669 and for Sussex again from 1673 to 1674. In 1672 he became a freeman of Portsmouth.

Eversfield first married (in 1644) Mary Muschamp daughter of Francis Muschamp of Bredinghurst, Camberwell and secondly (in 1666) Frances Roberts, widow of Richard Roberts of Thorpe Langton, Leicestershire and daughter of Thomas Carleton of Carshalton. His third wife (1670) was Cecily Warmestry, a stepdaughter of Sir John Covert, 1st Baronet (MP for Horsham), and sister-in-law of John Machell (MP for Horsham). His brother John Eversfield was MP for Steyning, Anthony Eversfield was MP for Horsham and Sir Thomas Eversfield was also an MP.

Parliament of England
Preceded by James Temple	Member of Parliament for Bramber; 1660–1661; With: John Byne	Succeeded by John Byne; Percy Goring
