= Jolliffe Lownes =

English apothecary (died 1627)

Jolliffe or Joliffe Lownes (died 1627) was an English apothecary who served the royal family.

== Career ==
Lownes married Maria Peyton in 1612, a daughter of a London merchant Henry Peyton. She was a sister of Sir Walter Peyton of Sutton Coldfield, an adventurer with the English East India Company who served as factor (in 1614) and subsequently captain or commander (1616) of the Expedition, sailing to Bantam (Banten) and Tecoe on Java. Peyton wrote a report on the prospects for setting up a trading on post on the "river Sindus" (Indus).

Lownes was apothecary to Prince Charles. Lownes had professional difficulties in February 1616 when a supplier, Michael Eason, was found to be supplying inferior materials. Eason had sold Lownes "defective Apothecarie wares" which were "unwholesome for a man's body".

A bill from 1619 details perfumes, rose water, lemon pill, sweet powder and damask powder, supplied to Prince Charles' servants, barber, and barge men. The bills were checked and certified by the Prince's chamberlain Robert Cary and the physician John Craig, and another bill presented in 1619 was countersigned by Matthew Lister a physician who served Anne of Denmark.

A bill presented in 1622 includes the perfuming of rooms at Nonsuch Palace and Denmark House, now known as Somerset House. This bill is also for Prince Charles, not King James. Lownes also received an allowance for travel and lodging in the Prince's service, of £5 annually, paid by Adam Newton.

As apothecary to Prince Charles, Lownes sailed to Spain in 1623 during the visit known as the Spanish Match. He was appointed apothecary to Charles as King on 4 June 1625.

After Lownes died in 1627 his post was given to John Wolfgang Rumler. His daughter Martha Lownes married William Weeley of Weeley.
