= Martin Lister (MP) =

English politician (d. 1670)

Sir Martin Lister (1602/03, Midhope, Yorkshire – 1670, Burwell, Lincolnshire) was an English farmer and politician who sat in the House of Commons from 1640 to 1648.

== Biography ==
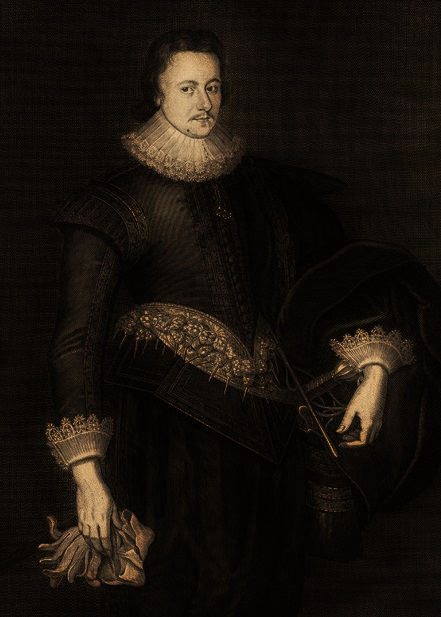
Portrait of Sir Martin Lister, Knight, 1626, by Robert Whight

Lister was born in the family of Michael and Mary Lister in Midhope, a small village to the north-west of Sheffield in South Yorkshire.

Lister was a landowner of Radcliffe, Buckinghamshire, Thorpe Arnold, Leicestershire, and Burwell, Lincolnshire.

In April 1640, he was elected Member of Parliament in the Short Parliament for Brackley with sir Thomas Wenman, 2nd Viscount Wenman. In November 1640, together with John Crew, 1st Baron Crew M. Lister was re-elected MP for Brackley for the Long Parliament, where both of them sat until they were excluded under Pride's Purge in 1648.

Lister died in Burwell, small village in the East Lindsey district in Lincolnshire.

== Family ==
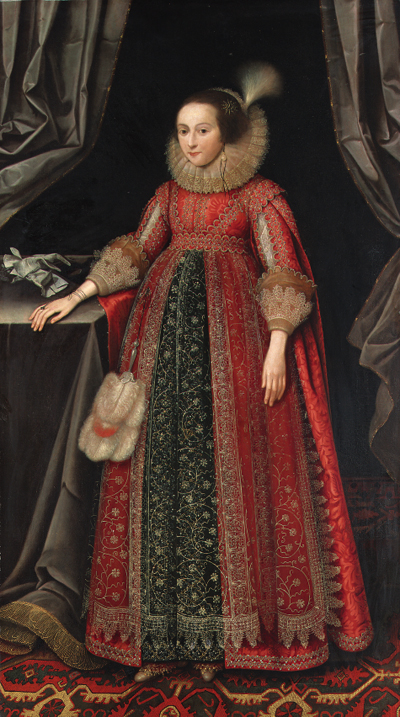
Portrait of Susanna Thornhurst (née Temple, later lady Lister), 1621, by Marcus Gheeraerts the Younger

Lister married firstly Mary Wenman, daughter of Richard Wenman, 1st Viscount Wenman of Oxfordshire.

After her death, he married secondly in 1633 Susan(na) Thornhurst (1600–1669), widow of Sir Gifford Thornhurst, 1st Baronet, daughter of Sir Alexander Temple of St. Margaret's, Rochester, Kent and sister of the regicide, James Temple. Her trustee for the marriage settlement was her half brother Sir Thomas Peniston.

By his first wife Mary Wenman, Lister had his eldest daughter Agnes Lister (Hartopp) who was born in January 1629, in small village of Thorp Arnold.

By his second wife Susan Thornhurst, Lister had sons Dr. Martin Lister (1639–1712), the physician and scientist, Richard Lister of Thorpe Arnold (1651–1704), esq, heir apparent of father, and Michael Lister of South Carlton, esq.

His stepdaughter Frances Agnes Thornhurst was the mother of Sarah Churchill, Duchess of Marlborough and of Frances Talbot, Countess of Tyrconnell.

== Notes ==
Parliament of England
Vacant Parliament suspended since 1629	Member of Parliament for Brackley; 1640–1648; With: Sir Thomas Wenman 1640; John Crew 1640–1648	Not represented in the Rump Parliament
