= Dorsa Lister =

Wrinkle ridge system on the Moon

Coordinates: 20.3°N 23.8°E

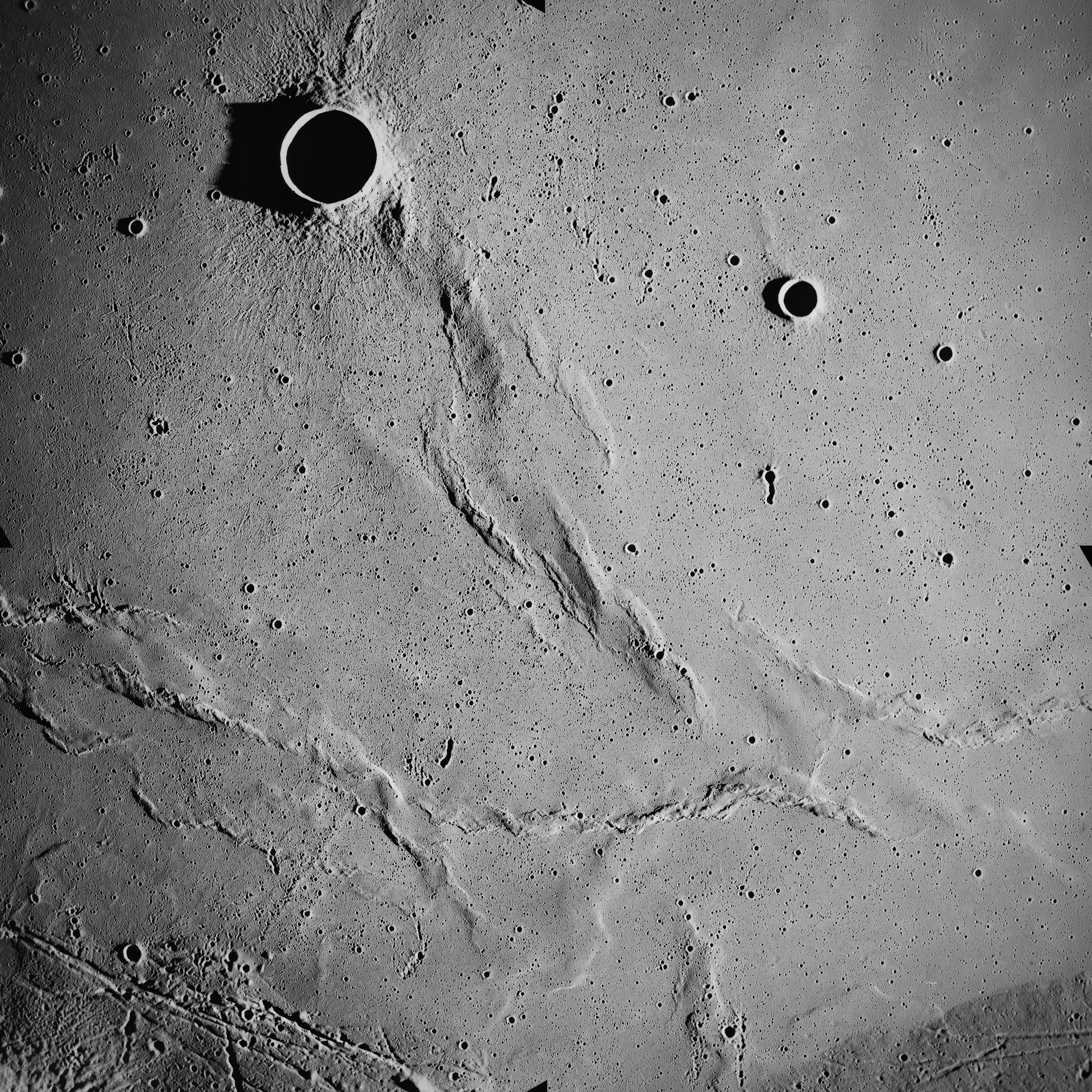
Southern Dorsa Lister at center, with Bessel in upper left, from Apollo 17

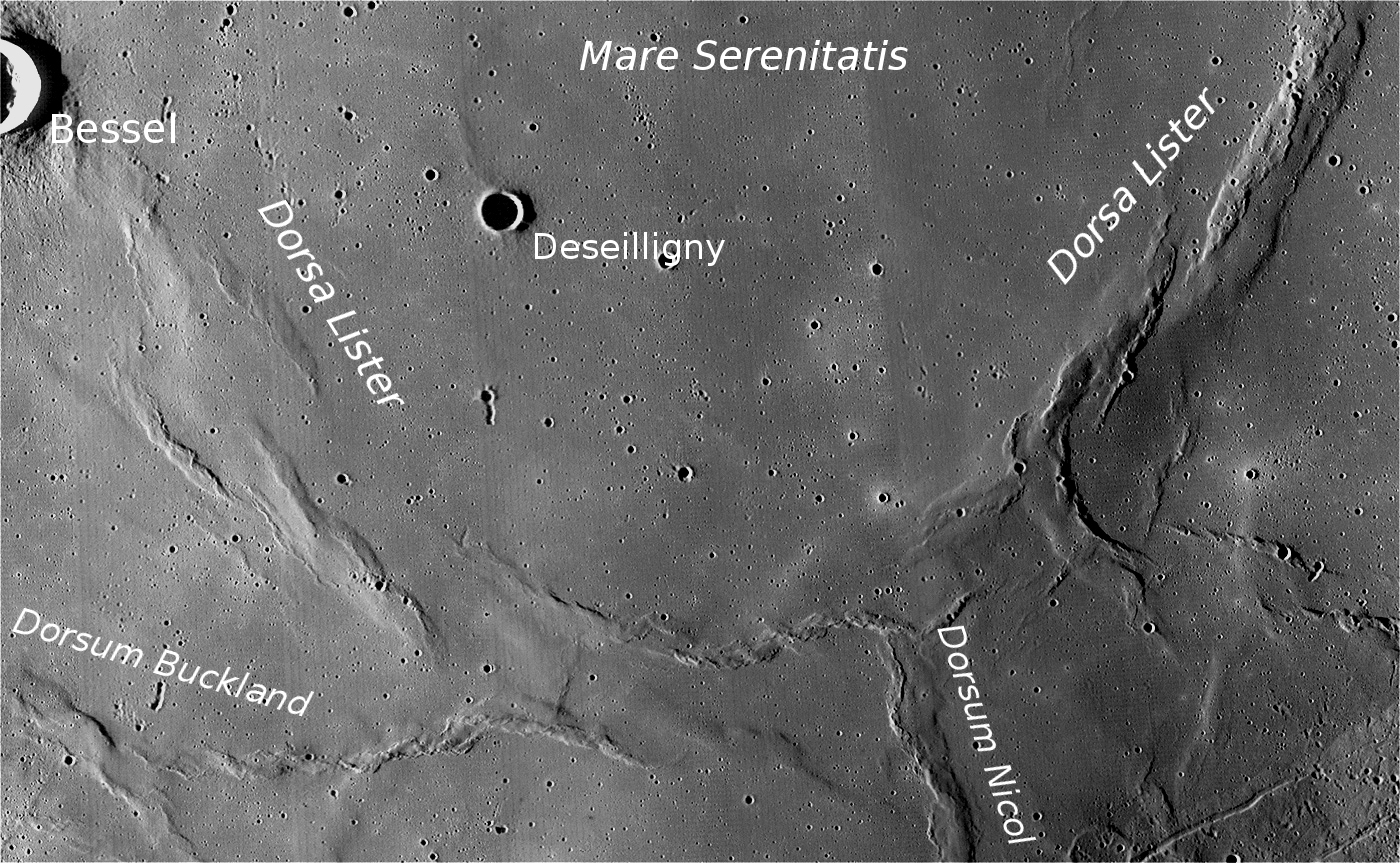
Dorsa Lister with Dorsa Nicol

Dorsa Lister is a wrinkle ridge system on the Moon, in southern Mare Serenitatis. It is 180 km in diameter and was named after English naturalist and physician Martin Lister in 1976.
