= Manor of Agney, Kent =

Historical estate in Old Romney, Kent

The manor of Agney was an estate in Old Romney, Kent owned by the Dean and Chapter of Canterbury Cathedral. The estate may have originated in the eighth century and for hundreds of years was leased to members of the same family, including Sarah, Duchess of Marlborough. It is frequently referred to as Agney Court, Agne Court, Agnes Court or even Aghne Court.

== History ==
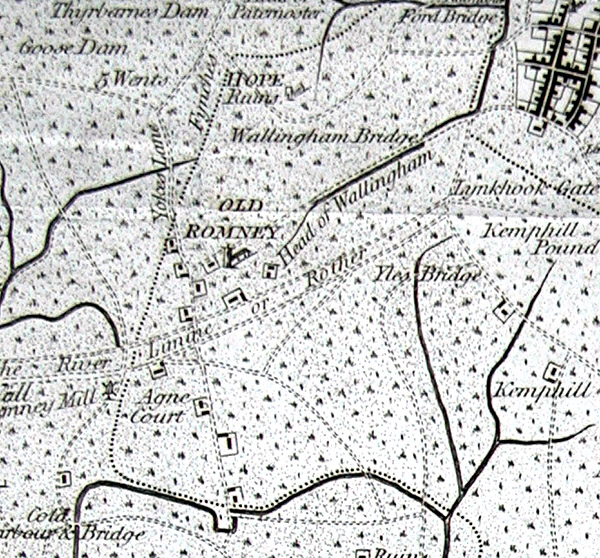
Agne Court, as shown in volume 8 of Edward Hasted's History and Topographical Survey of Kent. Note: North is towards the top left hand corner

The manor of Agney may have been the estate granted by King Offa to Ealdbeorht and Selethryth in 785. It is not mentioned by name in Domesday, but a number of unnamed properties in Old Romney belonging to the Archbishop of Canterbury are mentioned. Aghne Court, alias Old Romney court was described as the main manor of Old Romney. It was owned by the priory of Christchurch, Canterbury until the dissolution of the monasteries. Henry VIII then gave it to the Dean and Chapter of Canterbury Cathedral. The manor was let by them to tenants in a series of leases for lives.

In the middle of the 16th century the property was leased to Sir Stephen Thornhurst and passed to his son, Sir William Thornhurst and then to his son, Sir Giffard Thornhurst - the first (and only) baronet of Agnes Court. Sir Giffard married Susan Temple (sister of the regicide, James Temple). Their only male child died shortly after birth and on Sir Giffard's death in 1627, the manor passed to their daughter Frances, although it was held by Susan until Frances came of age and a new lease was prepared for her. Frances married Richard Jennings and in due course the property passed to their daughter Sarah, Duchess of Marlborough. In her will, she left it to George Spencer, 4th Duke of Marlborough and it remained in the Spencer family for some years thereafter.

The manor house, located about a mile south west of Old Romney parish church was called Agney Court (sometimes Agney Court Lodge) and the manor itself was frequently referred to by the name of the manor house - Agne Court, Agnes Court, Agney Court or even Aghne Court. The earlier manor house may have been destroyed in 1287/8 by a breach in the sea wall and then rebuilt following the repair of the breach.
