= Alexander Temple =

English politician (d. 1629)

Sir Alexander Temple
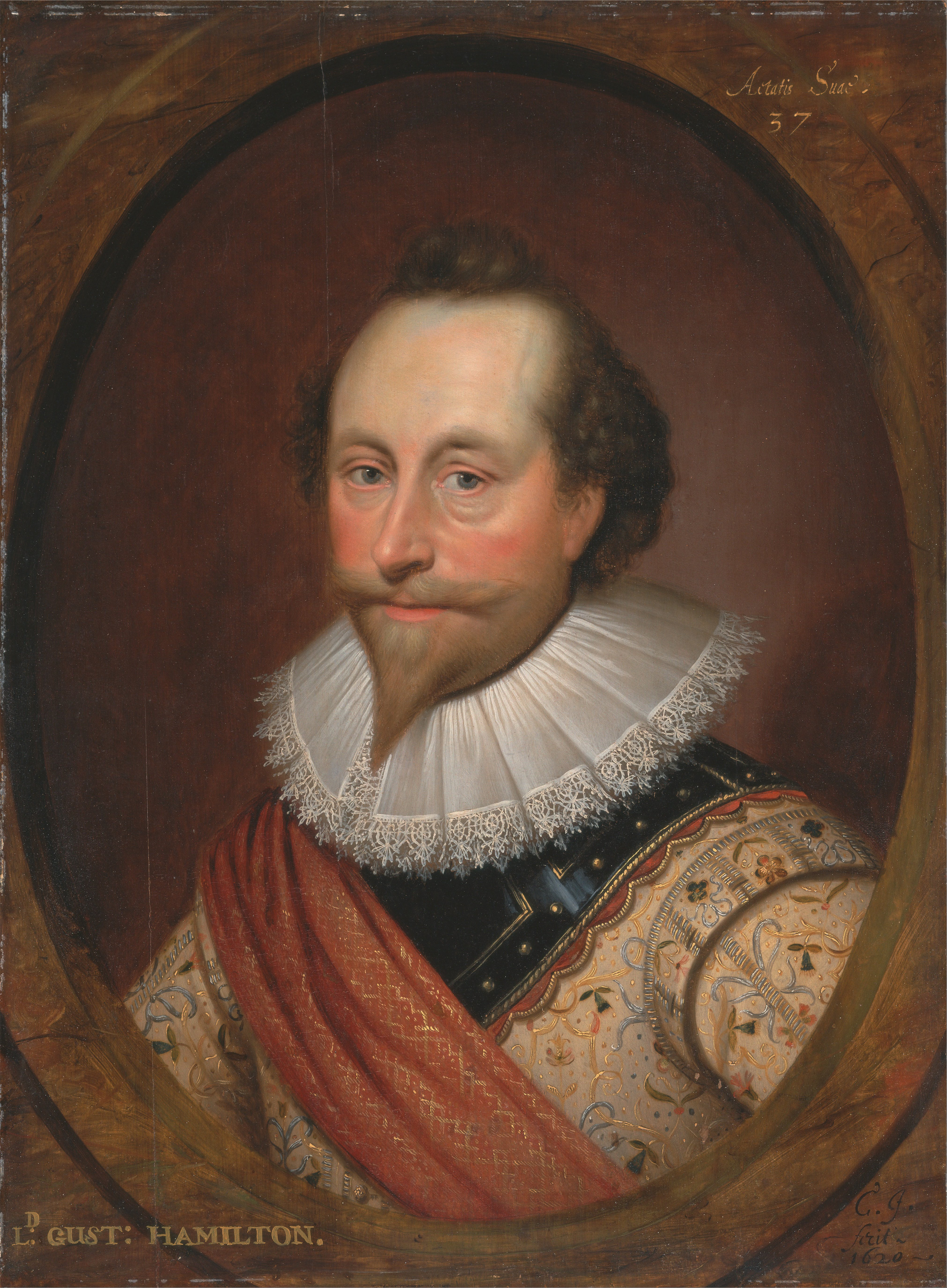
- Sir Alexander Temple by Cornelius Johnson
- Born: 1583; Stowe House, Buckinghamshire
- Died: 1629 (aged 45–46)
- Occupation: Landowner
- Spouse(s): (1) Mary Penistone (nee Sommer); (2) Margaret Griffin; (3) Mary Bankworth (formerly Busbridge nee Reve)
- Children: 3
- Parent(s): John Temple, Susan (nee Spencer)

Sir Alexander Temple (bapt. 9 February 1582 OS (1583 NS) – 1629) was an English landowner and Member of Parliament. He was born at Stowe House in 1583 and knighted in 1603. During his life he held many public offices, including justice of the peace and MP for Sussex. He was buried in Rochester Cathedral where there was a memorial to him which is now lost.

== Family ==
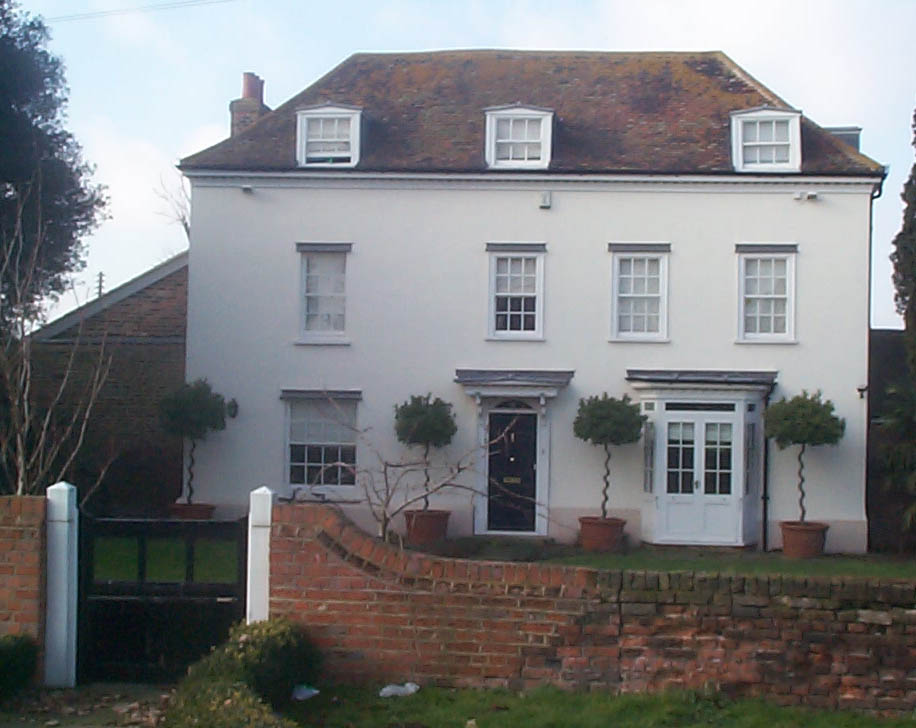
Longhouse Place (now known as Chadwell Place), the home of Sir Alexander Temple from 1607

Temple was born at Stowe House, the fourth son of John Temple and Susan Spencer) and was baptised on 9 February 1582 OS. He was the brother of Sir Thomas Temple and the brother-in-law of Viscount Saye and Sele.

In 1602 he married Mary Penistone (née Sommer or Somers, a daughter of John Somers), of Rochester Kent. They had three children:

- John, killed at the Isle of Rhe;
- James Temple, the regicide;
- Susan or Susanna Temple who is often said to have been maid of honour to Anne of Denmark although she is not known to be named in any records of the court. She married (1) Sir Gifford Thornhurst of Agney Court, Kent, and (2) Sir Martin Lister. Through her first marriage, Susan was grandmother of Sarah Jennings, Duchess of Marlborough. Her portrait was painted by Cornelius Johnson.

As a result of this marriage, Temple gained four step children including Sir Thomas Penistone

Temple was knighted at the Tower of London by James I following the King's accession to the English throne – one of many members of the gentry who were knighted during the first years of the King's reign.

Following the death of his first wife, Sir Alexander moved to Chadwell St Mary in Essex where he established a deer park. At this time, his portrait was painted by Cornelius Johnson - one of a number of Temple family portraits in the Lenthall picture collection.

In the early 1620s, he married Mary Bankworth (who was previously married to John Busbridge), and moved to Haremere Hall in Etchingham, Sussex.

Temple died in 1629 and was buried in Rochester Cathedral.

== Education ==
Temple was probably admitted to New College, Oxford in 1599. He was admitted to Lincoln's Inn in April 1600.

== Public Offices ==
Temple became a Sussex JP in 1622. In 1604, Temple was elected as an assistant warden of the Rochester Bridge Trust. He continued to serve on the court in various roles for the following eleven years. Temple was chosen as the senior warden in 1606 and the junior warden in 1612.

Temple was nominated as MP for Boston in 1621 by the Earl of Lincoln, but lost out to Sir Thomas Cheeke. In 1624, Temple tried to take the Winchelsea parliamentary seat from the control of the Finch family and succeeded in having John Finch's return invalidated. However Temple was defeated in the subsequent by-election.

In 1626, Temple was elected to the 2nd Parliament of King Charles I as MP for Sussex. Temple made six recorded speeches during this parliament. He was also appointed to 39 committees.

Parliament of England
Preceded by Sir Thomas Pelham, 2nd Baronet; Sir John Shurley	Member of Parliament for Sussex; 1626; With: Walter Covert	Succeeded by Sir William Goring, 1st Baronet; Richard Lewknor
