= William Thornhurst =

English landowner (1575–1606)

William Thornhurst (1575–1606) was an English landowner, the son of Stephen Thornhurst, keeper of Ford Park (died 1616) and his first wife. His second wife, Dorothy (1565–1620), was a daughter of Roger Drew of Denchworth. Her first husband was Dr Hippocrates d'Otthen of Holstein (died 1611).

Their lands were at Romney and Agney. Stephen Thornhurst sold Bramshill House to Edward la Zouche, 11th Baron Zouche. A brother, Thomas Thornhurst was killed at the siege of Saint-Martin-de-Ré in 1627. His monument is at Canterbury Cathedral.

William Thornhurst married Anne Howard (died 1633), a daughter of Thomas Howard, 1st Viscount Howard of Bindon. She was a half-sister of Frances Howard, who, as Lady Hertford, became a lady in waiting to Anne of Denmark.

Their children included:

- Gifford Thornhurst (died 1627), knighted in 1622, who married Susanna Temple. He was buried at Allington.
- Grace Thornhurst, who married the poet Mildmay Fane, 2nd Earl of Westmorland in 1620
- Frances Thornhurst, who married Robert Napier of Luton Hoo

He died on 24 July 1606 and was buried at Herne. A wall monument shows him kneeling at a desk. Above is a helmet and a heraldic carving of a stag hound. A local legend says the tomb was that of a hunter killed by his own dogs for Sabbath breaking.

== Anne Turberville ==
After William Thornhurst's death, his widow Anne married John Turberville of Woolbridge and Bere Regis. Woolbridge is near to Bindon Abbey and Lulworth Castle, a house built by her elder brother, Thomas Howard, 3rd Viscount Howard of Bindon.

Robert Napier's son, also called Robert, was born at Woolbridge in 1625, and John Turberville and Alice Fanshawe, Lady Hatton, were godparents. A legend of a phantom coach is attached to Woolbridge Manor, along with a story of Anne Howard and John Turberville's elopement. A "legend of the d'Urberville Coach" is mentioned by the character Angel Clare in Thomas Hardy's, Tess of the d'Urbervilles.
