= John Byne =

English politician

John Byne (1635–1661) was an English landowner and politician who sat in the House of Commons from 1659 to 1661.

Byne was the eldest son of Edmund Byne of Rowdell (near Washington, West Sussex) and his wife Elizabeth Goring, daughter of Henry Goring of Highden (also near Washington, West Sussex). He was baptised on 8 October 1635. In 1646 he succeeded to the estate of Rowdell on the death of his father. In 1659, he was elected Member of Parliament for Bramber in the Third Protectorate Parliament. He was also commissioner for militia for Sussex in 1659. He was commissioner for assessment from January 1660 until his death and captain of militia horse from April 1660 to his death. In April 1660 he was re-elected MP for Bramber in the Convention Parliament. He was commissioner for sewers for West Sussex from October 1660. In 1661 he was re-elected MP for Bramber in the Cavalier Parliament and was seated after a double return.

Byne died at the age of 26 and was buried at Washington on 31 December 1661.

Byne married Susanna Hodgson, daughter of Goldsmith Hodgson of Framfield, Sussex on 14 June 1657 and had four daughters. His widow married Sir Francis Guybon, MP for Thetford.

Parliament of England
Preceded by Not represented in Second Protectorate Parliament	Member of Parliament for Bramber; 1659; With: Sir John Fagg, 1st Baronet	Succeeded by James Temple
