= Sir Thomas Temple, 1st Baronet, of Stowe =

English landowner and politician (1567–1637)

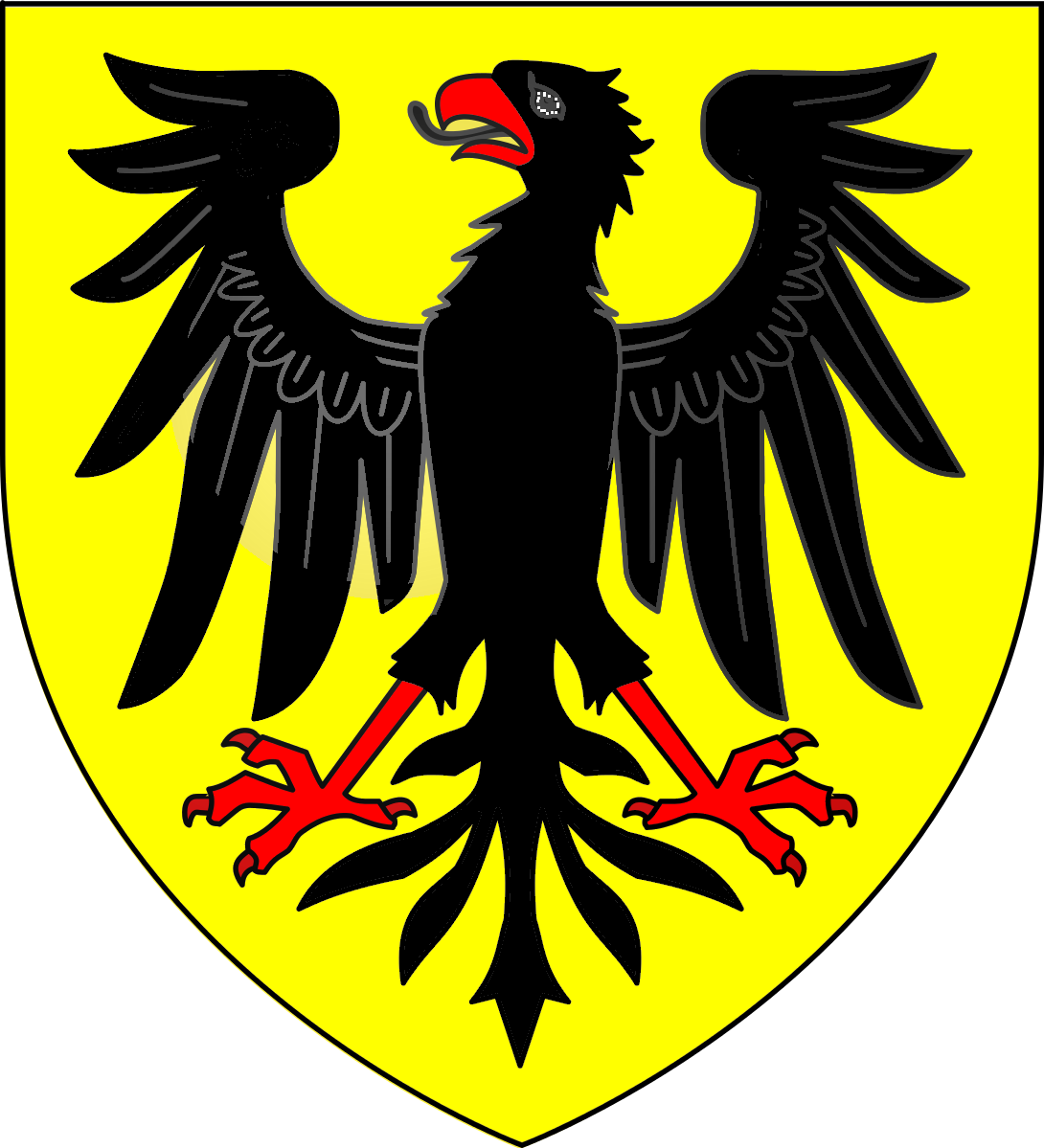
Arms of Temple of Stowe: Or, an eagle displayed sable

Sir Thomas Temple, 1st Baronet (9 January 1567 – 10 February 1637) was an English landowner and Member of Parliament.

== Early life ==
Thomas Temple was the eldest son of John Temple and his wife, Susan Spencer. Although he is said to have been born at Burton Dassett in Warwickshire, this seems improbable as his baptism on 9 January 1566/7 is recorded at Everton, Northamptonshire, the childhood home of his mother. As a child he moved with his father to Stowe House in Buckinghamshire. He grew up in a well connected, Puritan family - two of his brothers-in-law were William Fiennes, 1st Viscount Saye and Sele and Sir Nicholas Parker, while his nephew was James Temple, the regicide.

In 1582, he matriculated at University College, Oxford at the age of 16. He was admitted to Lincoln's Inn in 1584.

== Marriage and children ==
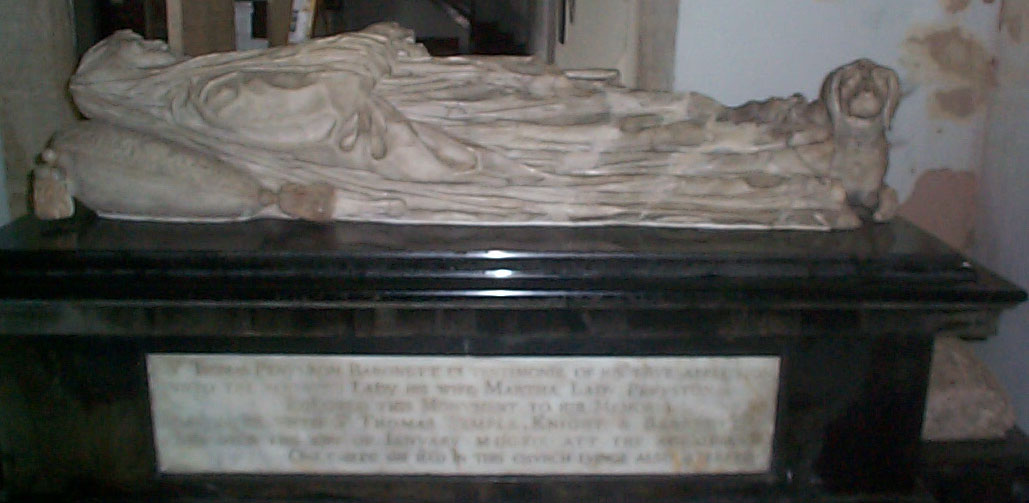
The memorial to Sir Thomas' daughter Martha, in Stowe church

Thomas Temple married Hester Sandys, daughter of Miles Sandys in about 1585 or 1586. Thomas and Hester had fifteen recorded children, 2 of whom died in infancy; of the remainder, 4 were sons and 9 were daughters. Their first child, Susan, was born on 5 September 1587, as Hester Sandys recorded herself. Their children included:

- Susan (b. 1587), who married Edward Clark by 1606
- Hester (b. 1589), who married Sir John Rous in 1605.
- Bridget (b. 1591), who married to Sir John Lenthall by 1606. He was the brother of Speaker Lenthall
- Peter (b. 1592) - eldest son and heir.
- John (1593 – 1594)
- Martha (b. 1595), who married Thomas Penistone in 1611
- Elizabeth (b. 1596), who married Sir Henry Gibbs of Honington by 1614
- John (b. 1598), who married Dorothy Lee by 1613
- Catherine (b. 1599), who married Sir William Ashcoombe in 1613
- Ann (b. 1601), who married Sir William Andrews in 1617
- Jane Sibilla (b. 1602 – d. 1602)
- Thomas (b. 1604)
- Margaret (b. 1606), who married Edward Longueville c. 1627.
- Miles (b. 1608)
- Millicent (b. 1611) m. Thomas Ogle c. 1629.

Through his son, John, Temple's grandson, Colonel Thomas Temple, was a proprietor and governor of the English colony of Nova Scotia from 1656 to 1670. His daughter Martha's husband was the step-son and ward of Sir Thomas' younger brother, Sir Alexander Temple. Martha was described by John Chamberlain as "a dainte fine lady".

Around 1619, Martha Penistone became the mistress of Richard Sackville, 3rd Earl of Dorset. She died of smallpox in January 1620, her father built a magnificent marble monument to her that can be seen in the "Penyston chapel" in Stowe church.

== Honours and offices ==
He was elected MP for Andover, Hampshire in 1589 as a result of the influence of his father in law - the first member of his family to serve in Parliament. He was knighted by James I in 1603 and purchased a baronetcy in 1611. In 1604, Temple purchased the Borough of Buckingham. This was a rotten borough and several generations of the Temple family served in parliament for this seat. In 1606, Thomas served as sheriff of Oxfordshire; he was sheriff of Buckinghamshire in 1616 and of Warwickshire in 1620.

== Financial difficulties ==
The wool industry on which the Temple family fortune had been founded had been suffering since the beginning of the seventeenth century. Sir Thomas also had other drains on his wealth. With such a large family, he had to meet significant expenses whenever his children got married - particularly dowries for his 9 daughters. In the 1620s, Sir Thomas was planning to sell some land to reduce his debts. His son, Peter, claimed that the land could not be sold because it was entailed to him. He took his Sir Thomas to court to prevent the sale. Eventually, the legal case between father and son was settled by an arbitrator. Sir Thomas was allowed to sell the land, but he had to make a payment to Sir Peter.

== Family correspondence ==
In the early 17th century, the Temple family wrote and received many letters - both official and personal. In the Stowe papers at the Huntington Library there are a large number of letters written to Sir Thomas and a small number of letters written by him to other family members.

== Notes ==
Parliament of England
Preceded by Edwin Sandys; James Hawley	Member of Parliament for Andover; 1589; With: Henry Reade	Succeeded by Miles Sandys; Edward Barker
Political offices
Preceded by Sir Edmund Wheler	High Sheriff of Buckinghamshire; 1616–1617	Succeeded by Sir William Fortescue
Baronetage of England
New creation	Baronet (of Stowe); 1611–1637	Succeeded by Peter Temple
