= Susanna Temple =

English courtier (1600–1669)

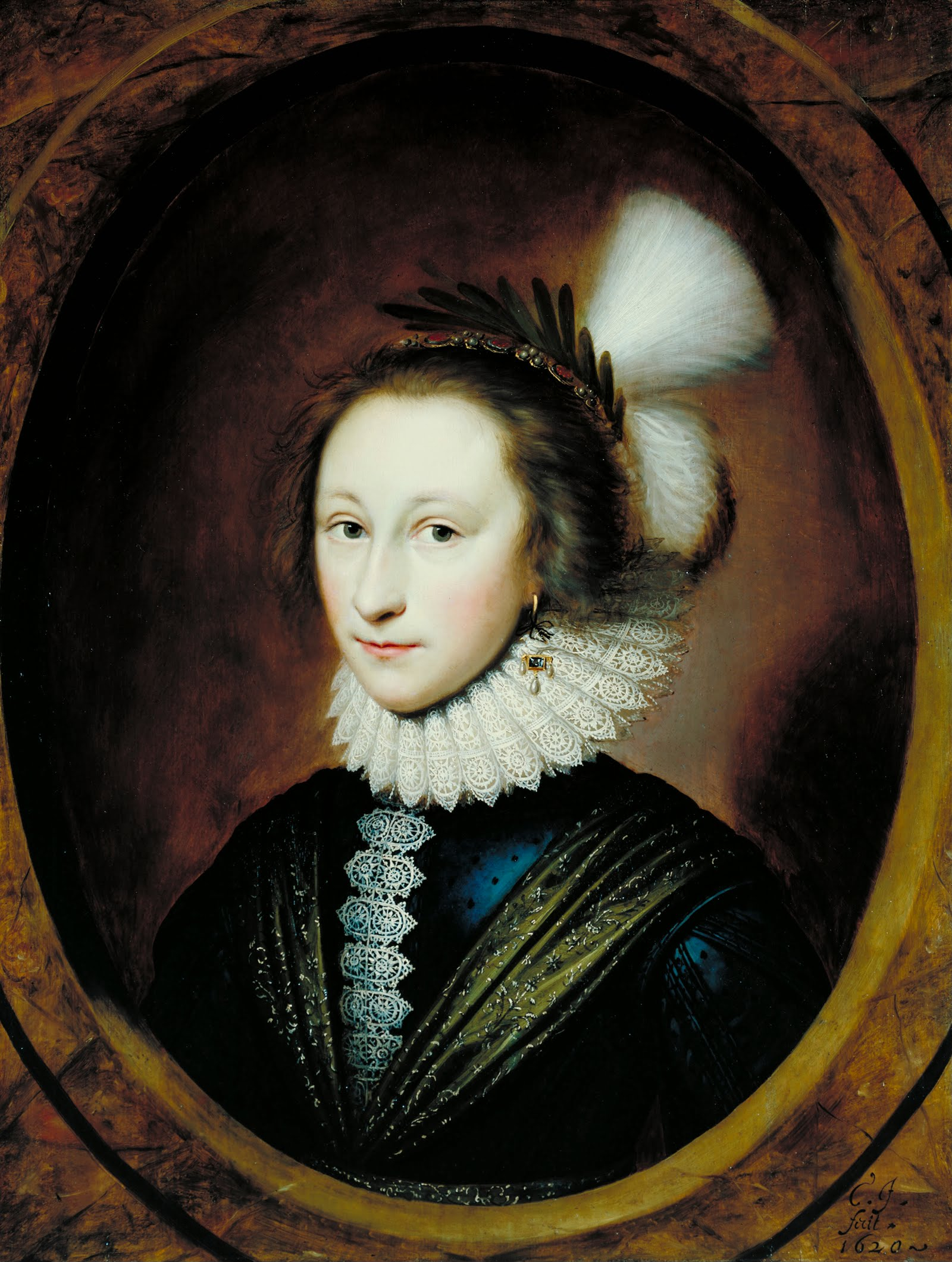
Portrait of Susanna Temple, later Lady Lister (1620), by Cornelius Johnson

Susanna Temple, Lady Lister (formerly Thornhurst; 1600–1669) was an English courtier.

She was a daughter of Alexander Temple of Etchingham and Mary Penistone, née Mary Sommer or Somers (a daughter of John Somers). She is said to have been a maid of honour to Anne of Denmark, although she is not known to be named in any records of the court.

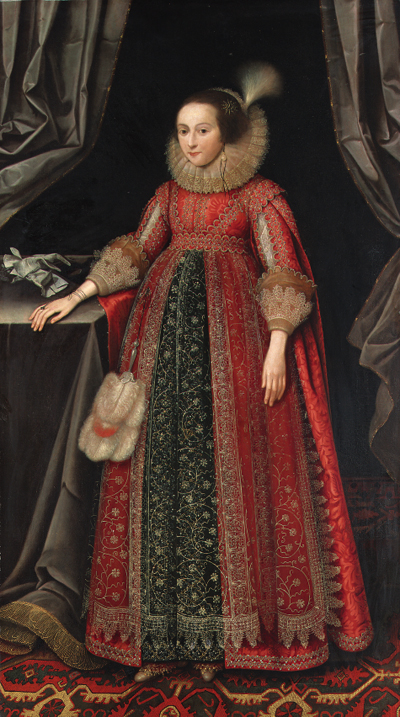
Susanna Temple, Lady Lister (1621)

Her portrait was painted by Cornelius Johnson in 1620. She is depicted wearing a drop earring, including a martlet, the bird is part of the Temple coat of arms.

Another portrait was painted in 1621 by an artist working in the manner of Marcus Gheeraerts the Younger. There is also a miniature in the manner of Nicholas Hilliard, with her hair down.

She married Sir Gifford Thornhurst of Agney Court, Kent (d. 1627), the son of William Thornhurst (d. 1606) and Anne Howard, a daughter of Thomas Howard, Viscount Bindon. Their daughter Frances, born after the death of Gifford in 1627, and named after one of his sisters, was the mother of Sarah Jennings, Duchess of Marlborough.

In 1626 her sister-in-law Grace Thornhurst (d. 1636) married the poet Mildmay Fane. Her brother-in-law, Thomas Thornhurst wrote a description of Lanzarote.

As a widow she was involved in litigation over a debt to Sir John Lambe.

Her second husband was Sir Martin Lister of Thorpe Arnold, nephew of Matthew Lister, one of Anne of Denmark's physicians, and friend of Mary Sidney. Their son Martin Lister became physician to Queen Anne. Some of her letters to Martin at college in Oxford survive.

She died in 1669.
