= Andrews baronets of Doddington (1641) =

Extinct baronetcy in Doddington, England

Escutcheon of the Andrews Baronets of Doddington

The Andrews baronetcy, of Doddington in the County of Northampton, was created in the Baronetage of England on 11 December 1641 for William Andrews, a Royalist of De(i)nton (Little Doddington). The title became extinct on the death of the 5th Baronet in 1804.

== Andrews baronets, of Doddington (1641) ==
- Sir William Andrews, 1st Baronet (died c. 1649)
- Sir John Andrews, 2nd Baronet (died c. 1665)
- Sir William Andrews, 3rd Baronet (died 1684)
- Sir Francis Andrews, 4th Baronet (died 1759)
- Sir Williams Andrews, 5th Baronet (died 1804)
