= Old Romney =

Village in Kent, England

Coordinates: 50.99°N 0.895°E

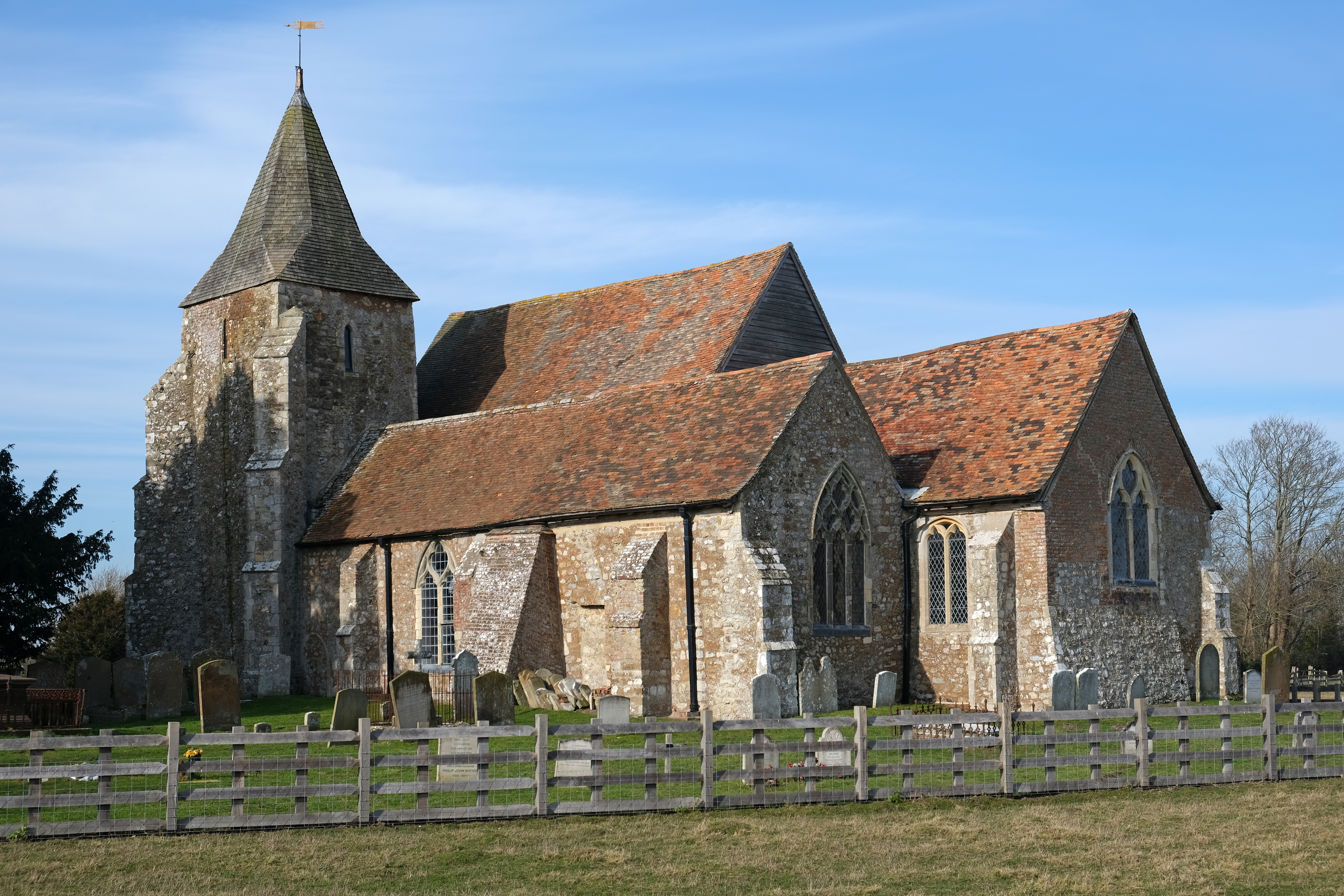
- St Clement's Church, Old Romney

- Location within Kent
- Population: 215 (2011)
- District: Folkestone and Hythe
- Shire county: Kent
- Region: South East
- Country: England
- Sovereign state: United Kingdom
- Post town: ROMNEY MARSH
- Postcode district: TN29
- Police: Kent
- Fire: Kent
- Ambulance: South East Coast
- UK Parliament: Folkestone and Hythe

Old Romney is a village and civil parish in the Folkestone and Hythe district of Kent, England.

The village, as its name suggests, is the original site of the settlement, and is situated two miles (3.2 km) inland from New Romney. It lies on what was once an island in the former estuary of the River Rother.

It was noted in Roman times as Vetus Rumellenum. By the time of the Domesday Book in the 11th century, New Romney had been established.

== Parish history ==
Old Romney is a village and civil parish located in the Folkestone and Hythe district of Kent.

Old Romney St. Clement is a parish dating back to ancient times and, as the name hints out, commenced the primitive settlement of Romney Marsh. It was, thus, the initial port of Romney which over time, stretched out along the Rother toward the sea with either half being labelled "Old" and "New" Romney. As the port let go the importance of the village of Old Romney dwindled and not long after that, only St. Clement and the settlement were left untouched by the 1600s.

The location of the village and civil parish is on an island in the River Rother.

== St Clement's Church ==
St Clement's Church in Old Romney, Romney Marsh, is a Church of England parish church and one of the oldest churches in Kent. It was originally constructed in the 12th century although there is some evidence of an original structure on the site dating back to the 8th century.

The church with the Georgian minstrels' gallery and box pews retaining their rose pink colour was featured in the 1962 film The Scarecrow of Romney Marsh. Disney and the Rank Film Organisation repainted them in for the filming.

== Notable people ==
- Sarah Churchill, Duchess of Marlborough who owned Agney Court in this parish.
- Derek Jarman, film-maker and AIDS activist, who is buried in the churchyard of St Clement's church
