= Andrews baronets of Lathbury (1661) =

Escutcheon of the Andrews Baronets of Lathbury

The Andrews baronetcy, of Lathbury in the County of Buckingham, was created in the Baronetage of England on 27 May 1661 for Harry Andrews. He was the son of Sir William Andrews, High Sheriff of Buckinghamshire in 1629, and his wife Anne Temple, daughter of Sir Thomas Temple, 1st Baronet, of Stowe.

The title became extinct on his death in 1696. The Lathbury estate went to his nephew Henry Andrews, High Sheriff of Buckinghamshire in 1704.

== Andrews baronets, of Lathbury (1661) ==
- Sir Harry Andrews, 1st Baronet (c.1629–1696)
