= Matthew Lister (physician) =

English physician (d. 1657)

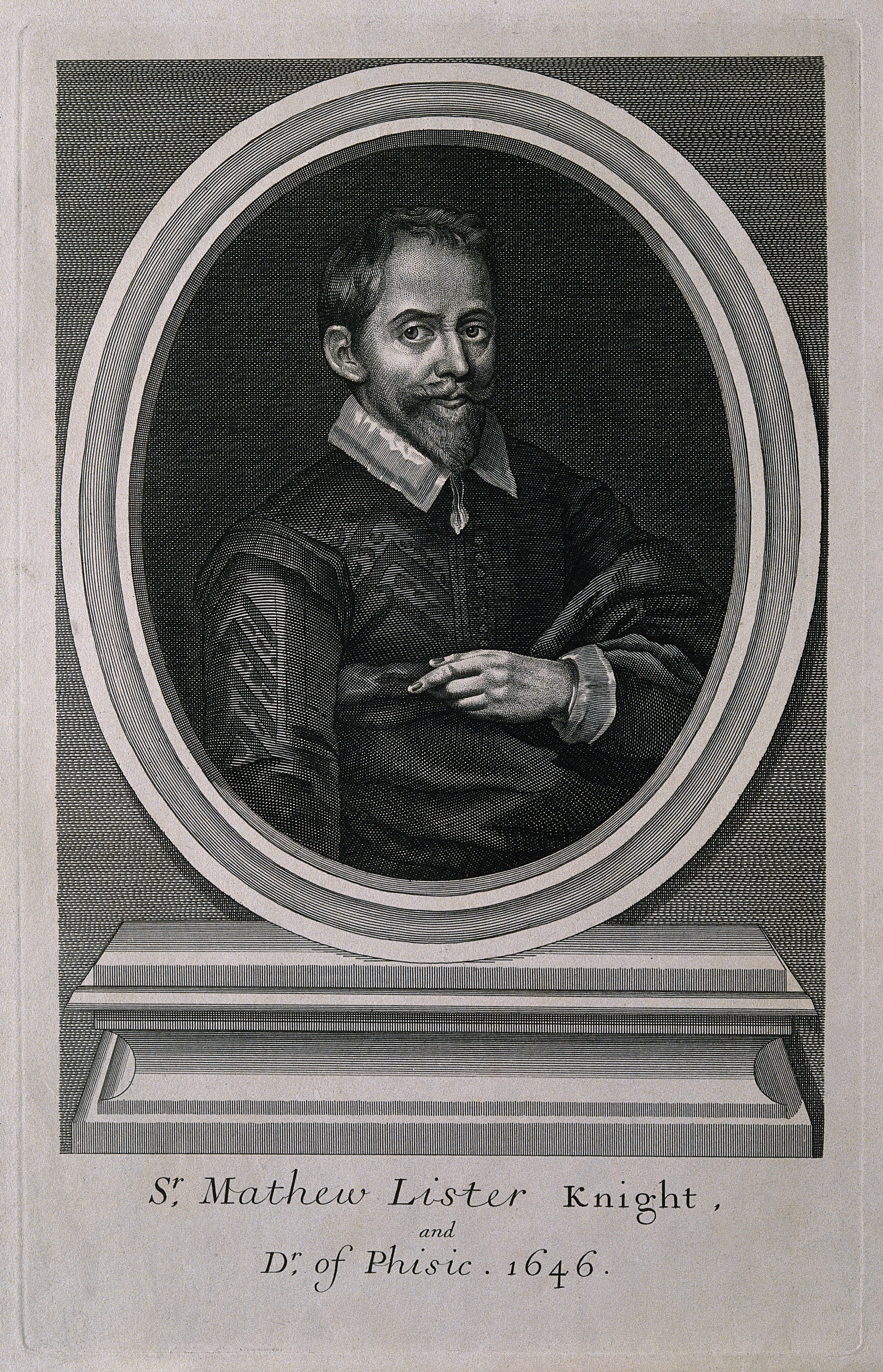
Engraving of a portrait of Matthew Lister

Matthew Lister (died 1657) was a physician to the English royal family and is known for his relationship with the Countess of Pembroke.

== Background and early career ==
Lister was a son of William Lister of Thornton in Craven in Yorkshire and Anne Mydhope of Skipton. As a younger son, he studied at Oriel College, Oxford and learnt the practice of physic at Basel. Edward Wilmot (died 1786) reported that Lister had made some advances in medicine, and his recipes were widely used, where applicable without modification. Some of his prescriptions were collected by Hans Sloane and survive today at the British Library. The manuscript recipes are mostly in Latin and employ a simple code for some terms.

In 1604, his academic colleagues at Oriel provided a testimonial of his good character. From 1607, he was a fellow of the College of Physicians in London. Correspondence indicates that Lister's medical opinions were eagerly sought by landowners by letter and in person when he visited Yorkshire.

== France and Italy ==
Lister and John Finet were employed to take Lord Cranborne, the son of Sir Robert Cecil on a Grand Tour to France and Italy in 1610 and 1611. Lister looked after Cranborne when he was sick at Padua. He seems to have had a fever and depression and wished to return to England. The party had permission to travel through the Papal States and Bologna to Florence. Protestants were not always allowed to travel by this route. Cosimo II de' Medici, Grand Duke of Tuscany may have obtained this permission because negotiations for the marriage of Prince Henry and his sister Caterina de' Medici were then underway. Cranborne could not be persuaded to continue to Tuscany, and after a visit to Dudley Carleton and the Venice Carnival, the party returned via a journey on the Rhine, seeing Amsterdam, The Hague, Vlissingen, and sailing from Calais to England in April 1611.

During the trip, Lister probably met Mark Belford, an English diplomat, who later bequeathed him an anatomy book by Andreas Vesalius. Lister and Théodore de Mayerne treated Robert Cecil during his final illness in 1612.

== Lister and the Sidney circle ==
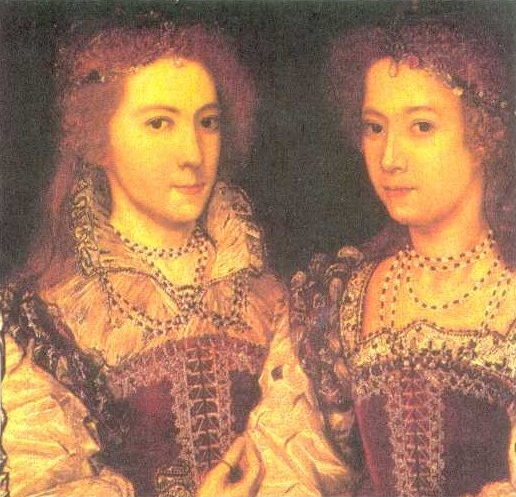
Dorothy and Penelope Devereux were identified as Philoclea and Pamela in Philip Sidney's Arcadia.

Lister was employed by Mary Sidney, Countess of Pembroke, (died 1621). She travelled with him to Spa, Belgium. They were in Antwerp in September 1614, with Bridget Parham (a daughter of Thomas Tresham), and considered going to Breda or staying with William Trumbull in Brussels. Lister wrote that the countess continued her "spa diet". They were at Amiens in November 1614. Letters for the countess were to be addressed to Lister and he made arrangements for finance and letters of credit through the network of English diplomats.

In 1616, Dudley Carleton met her at Spa in the company of Helene de Melun, "Countess of Berlaymont", wife of Florent de Berlaymont the governor of Luxembourg. The two women amused themselves with pistol shooting. There were rumours that Sidney had married Lister, in her widowhood when she was building a lodge at Houghton. Lister and Leonard Welstead were trustees of Lady Pembroke, and had obtained Houghton from Sir Edward Conquest in 1615.

John Chamberlain wrote in April 1617 that there was "a suspicion that the olde countesse of Pembroke is married to Doctor Lister that was with her at the Spa". Lady Mary Wroth may have dramatised the couple's relationship in her Love's Victory. When the Countess of Pembroke died in 1621, Chamberlain wrote that Lister received a pension from her estate and was "well worn in her service", which made him look old.

In 1640, a mutual acquaintance of Mary Sidney, Nathan Walworth, bequeathed to Lister £10, a picture of the town of Spa, and a painting of Philoclea and Pamela, the heroines of Philip Sidney's Arcadia.

== Physician in ordinary ==
Lister became of one the physicians serving Anne of Denmark. Mary Sidney's brother, Robert Sidney, 1st Earl of Leicester, was the Chamberlain of the Queen's Household. Lister also treated the actor Edward Alleyn. Lister countersigned a bill from the apothecary Jolliffe Lownes who chiefly worked for Prince Charles.

Lister was drawn into a controversy surrounding the death of King James at Theobalds in 1625. Charles I of England appointed him his "physician in ordinary".

He was probably the "Mr Doctor Litster" who attended Francis Manners, 6th Earl of Rutland in his final illness in 1632. In 1644 Lister and Mayerne went to Exeter to attend Henrietta Maria.

== Family ==
William Lister married Catherine Fairfax, his second wife was called Anne. He had no children. His nephew, Sir Martin Lister of Thorpe Arnold, who married Susanna Temple (1600–1669), was his heir.

He was knighted on 11 October 1636. He died in 1657 (or 1656) at his estate at Burwell in Lincolnshire. His portrait, attributed to Paul van Somer, was engraved.
