= James Temple =

English regicide

- Born: c. 1606; Rochester, Kent
- Died: 17 February 1680; Elizabeth Castle, Jersey, Channel Islands
- Spouse(s): Mary Busbridge (married 1627); Joanna van Tromp
- Children: John (bef 1629); Alexander (1629); James (1630); Thomas (1631); Mary (1632); Peter (1633)
- Parent(s): Sir Alexander Temple; Mary Sommer

James Temple (c. 1606–1680) was a puritan and English Civil War soldier who was convicted of the regicide of Charles I. Born in Rochester, Kent, to a well-connected gentry family, he was the second of two sons of Sir Alexander Temple, although his elder brother died in 1627. As a child, Temple moved with his father from Rochester to Chadwell St Mary in Essex and then to Etchingham in Sussex, where he settled.

Temple gained military experience as a member of the Duke of Buckingham's expedition to the Isle of Ré in 1627. As a puritan, he joined the Parliamentary army at the outbreak of the Civil War and fought at the Battle of Edgehill. He rose to become a colonel and commanded Tilbury Fort, an important defensive position on the approach to London by river. He was elected as a Member of Parliament (MP) for Bramber in September 1645 to replace an ejected Royalist. He sided with the army in opposing any compromise with the King, and survived Pride's purge. He was appointed as a judge at the trial of King Charles I of England. Temple attended most of the court sessions and was the 28th (of 59) to sign the King's death warrant. After the restoration of Charles II, he was convicted of regicide, but avoided execution and was imprisoned in Jersey, where he died.

== Early life ==
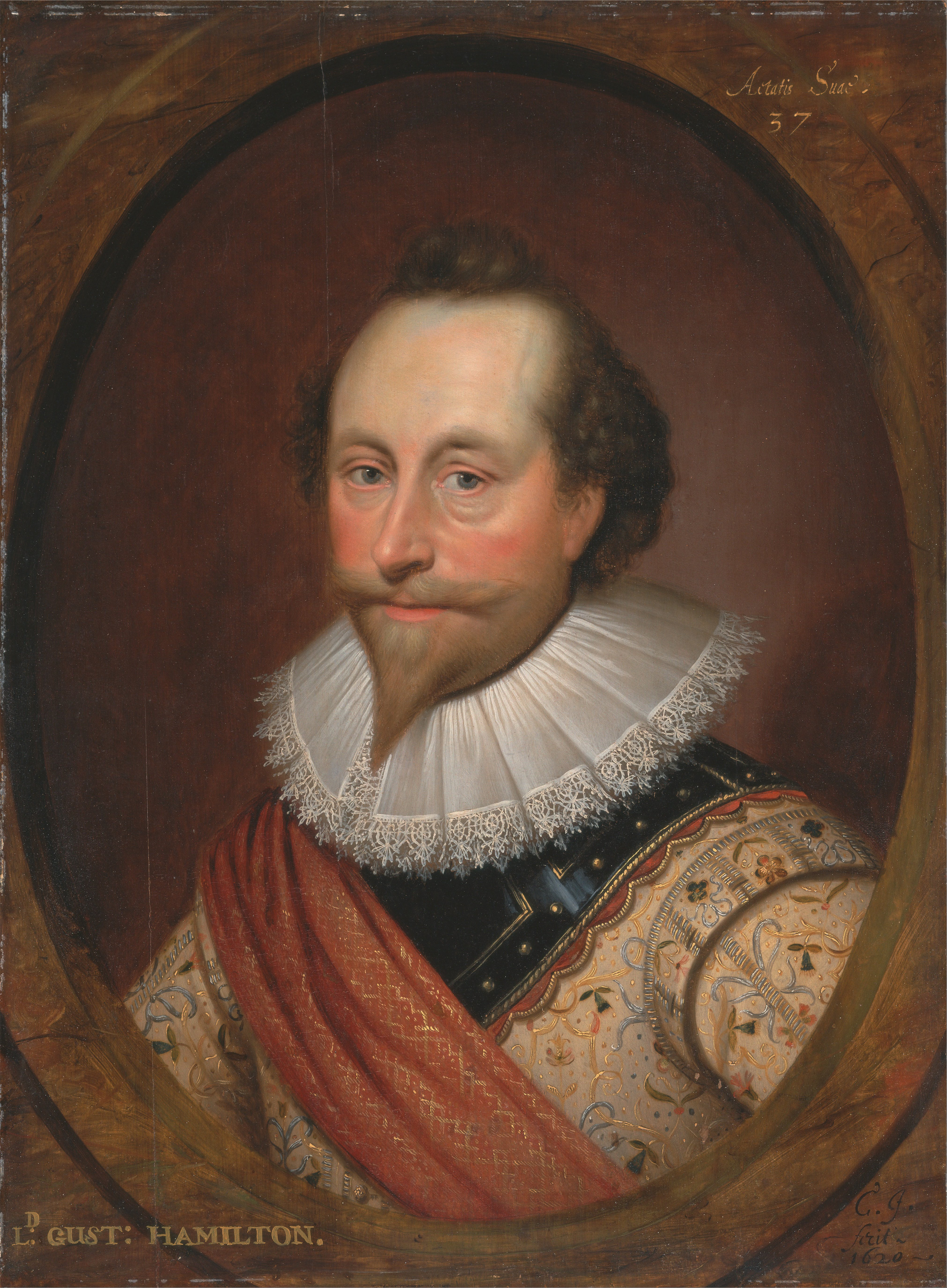
Sir Alexander Temple, father of James Temple, by Cornelius Johnson. This version, which was among the Lenthall pictures, is incorrectly inscribed Ld Gust Hamilton.

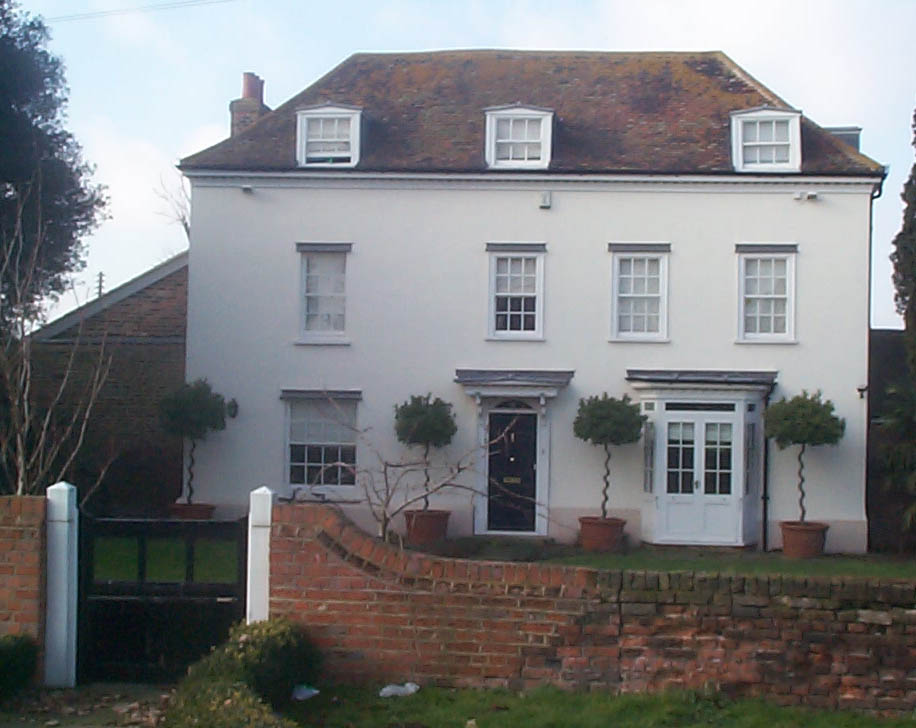
Longhouse Place (now known as Chadwell Place), the childhood home of James Temple

Temple was born to Sir Alexander Temple and Mary Sommer while his parents were living in the parish of St. Margaret's in Rochester, Kent in the house previously owned by his mother's first husband. His family was closely related to the Temple family of Stowe House. The family belonged to the gentry, having a reasonable income, without being members of the aristocracy. His father had been knighted at the Tower of London by James I following the King's accession to the English throne – one of many members of the gentry who were knighted during the first years of the King's reign.

Temple had an older brother (John) and a sister (Susan). As a result of his mother's first marriage, he had two half-brothers (including Sir Thomas Peniston) and two half-sisters. He was born into a well connected family. His uncles included Sir Thomas Temple, 1st Baronet, of Stowe and William Fiennes, 1st Viscount Saye and Sele. His sister, Susan Temple, Lady Lister, was the mother of Martin Lister and the grandmother of Sarah Churchill, Duchess of Marlborough.

In 1607, following his mother's death, he moved to Longhouse Place (now known as Chadwell Place) in Chadwell St Mary, Essex. Both he and his older brother John, were admitted to Lincoln's Inn in 1622. In the same year, Temple was given permission by the privy council to travel abroad for up to three years. He was allowed to take a servant with him, but he was strictly forbidden to visit Rome.

While Temple was living in Chadwell St Mary, a number of Temple family portraits were painted by Cornelius Johnson. These may have been part of a family commission. They include Temple's father (which hangs in Hagley Hall) and his sister (which is in the Tate Gallery). These family portraits may have included Temple himself, but no portrait is known to have survived.

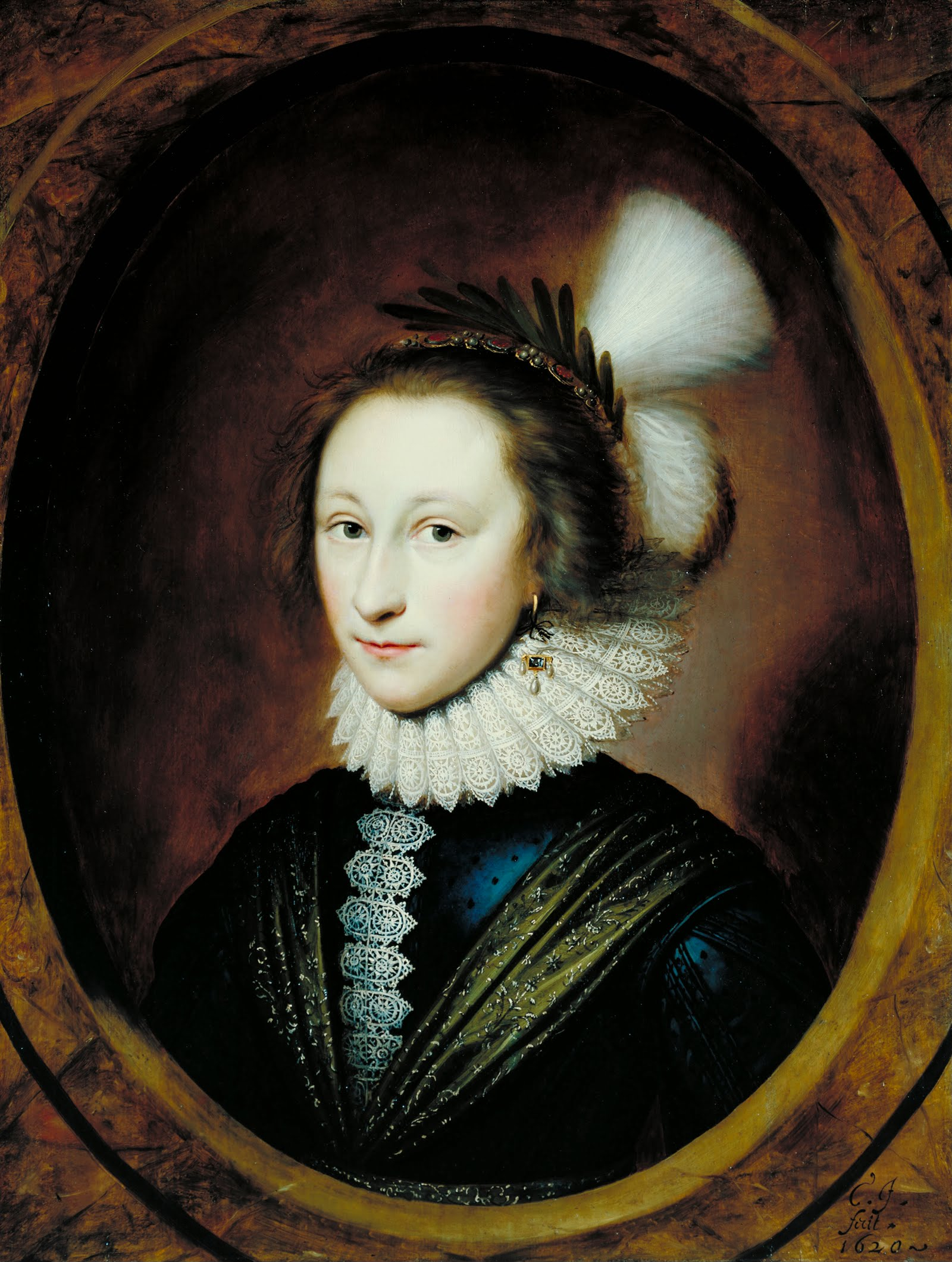
Temple's sister, Susan (or Susanna) Temple, later Lady Lister (1620), by Cornelius Johnson.

In the early 1620s, as a result of his father's marriage to Mary Bankworth (who was previously married to John Busbridge), he moved, this time to Haremere Hall in Etchingham, Sussex. His father's third marriage gave him step siblings, including his stepsister, Mary Busbridge to whom Temple was married in March 1627. Over the next few years, they had six children. They initially lived in Etchingham where five of their children were baptised.

=== Isle of Ré expedition ===
In June 1627, George Villiers, 1st Duke of Buckingham led an expedition to the island of Île de Ré to support the Huguenots besieged in La Rochelle by King Louis XIII of France. With no standing army, Buckingham's forces were largely volunteers and mercenaries. Since public opinion in England (particularly among extreme Protestants) supported the Huguenots, a number of well connected gentry came forward. The volunteers to join Buckingham included Temple, his elder brother John and other members of his family. The expedition to the Isle of Ré, was a disaster and altogether, Buckingham lost more than 5,000 men in the campaign out of a force of 7,000. Among those who died was Temple's brother.

=== Life in Sussex ===
When his father died in 1629, Temple was the main beneficiary of his father's estate. However, much of his father's property was held via his wife, mortgaged or being used to meet other commitments. Temple had a relatively meagre inheritance – no grand country house, no great estate and certainly no large fortune. His financial affairs were not in good order and were discussed by other members of the family. Margaret Longville, Temple's cousin, wrote to her mother, "my cousin Cary Saunders is broke for forty thousand pounds and is not able to pay five shillings in the pound and James Temple is in too much". (Cary was the family name for Carew Saunders.) During Charles I's Personal Rule (1629–1640), he was part of a network of Puritan gentry in Sussex and in due course became a Sussex justice of the peace (JP).

== Civil War ==
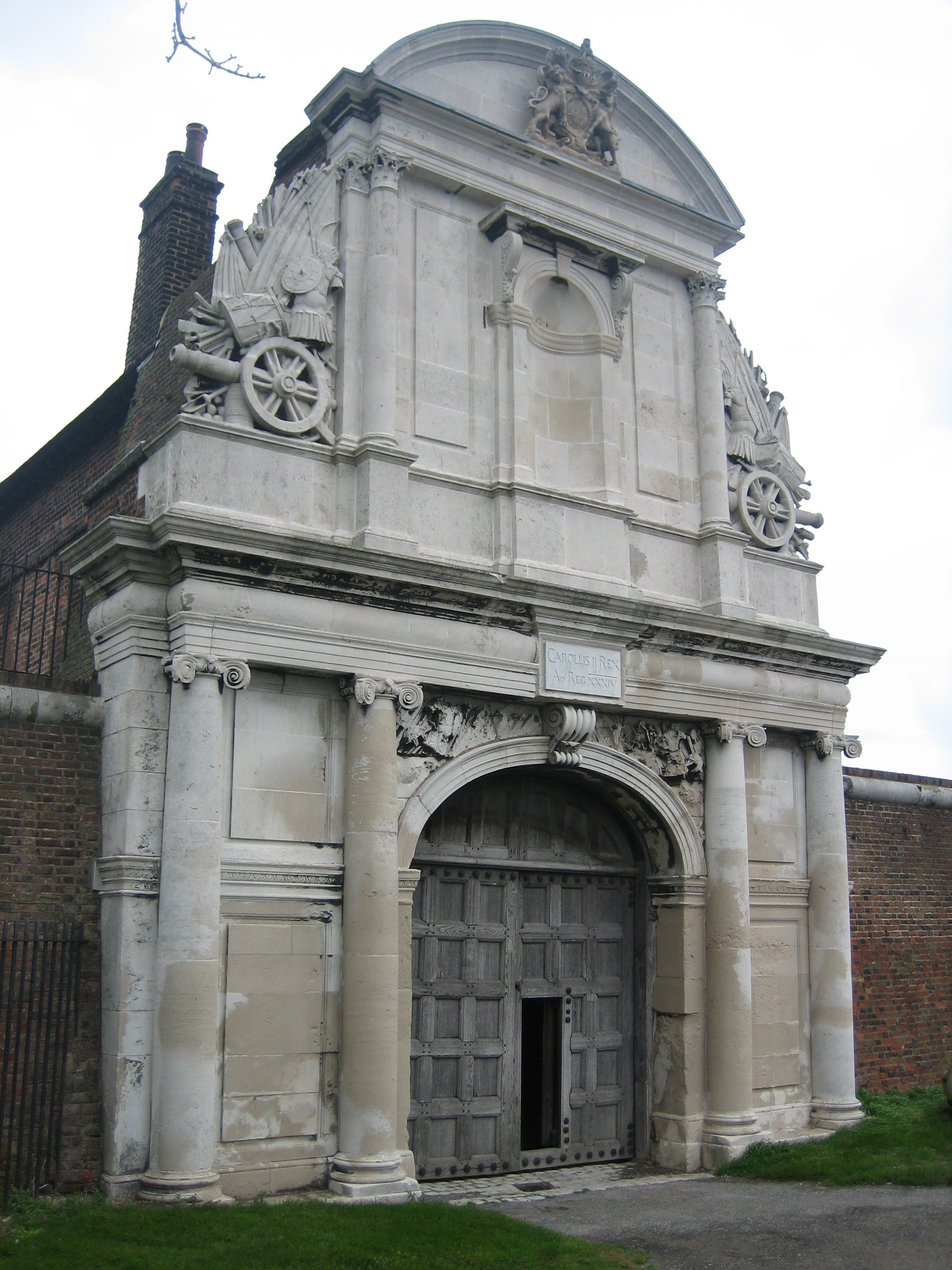
The Water Gate of Tilbury fort. Temple was captain of the earlier, "blockhouse" fort.

Temple, like most members of his family, was a puritan and supported Parliament against the King. His uncle Lord Saye and Sele was one of the King's principal opponents. Temple's military experience became useful when the First English Civil War broke out in August, 1642. He was appointed captain of a troop of horse raised by Lord Saye and Sele and commanded by Temple's cousin, John Fiennes. Temple was related to Oliver Cromwell via his kinsman Edward Whalley and was able to secure a commission for Whalley in his uncle's unit. He saw action close to the Temple family home at Stowe where both Temple and Whalley fought at the Battle of Edgehill in October 1642. In March 1643, he had returned to Sussex, and along with his stepbrother, John Busbridge, he was appointed by Parliament to the Sussex committee set for the sequestration (i.e. seizure and administration) of the assets of prominent Royalists. During the Battle of Bramber Bridge in December 1643, Temple was prominent in the defence of the crossing of the River Adur at Bramber Castle against a Royalist attack during Lord Hopton's attempt to obtain control of Sussex for the King. His actions were described by Dr Cheynell:

"Upon the 12th of December I visited a brave soldier of my acquaintance, Captn Jas Temple, who did that day defend the fort of Bramber against a bold and daring enemy to the wonder of all the country; and I did not marvel at it, for he is a man that hath his head full of stratagems, his heart full of piety and valour, and his hand as full of success as it is of dexterity."

As the war progressed, Temple was promoted to colonel and became governor of Tilbury Fort in Essex, a post that had previously been held by his father. The fort was close to Temple's childhood home at Longhouse Place and was of strategic importance because it controlled the approach to London by river. During the Second Civil War, there were Royalist uprisings in Kent and Essex. Temple's control of Tilbury Fort for Parliament enabled Lord Fairfax's troops to cross from Gravesend to Tilbury en route to Colchester for the siege of royalists in that town.

== Trial of Charles I and Commonwealth ==
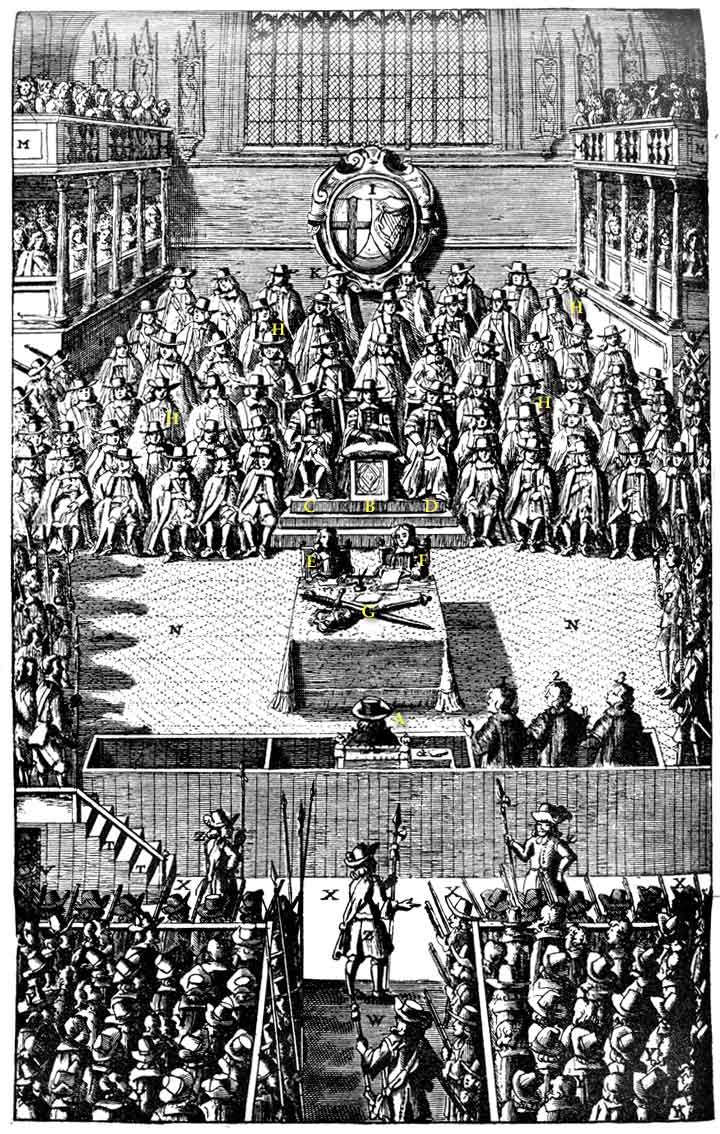
The Trial of Charles I on 4 January 1649, from John Nalson's "Record of the Trial of Charles I, 1688" in the British Museum.

In September 1645, Temple was elected Member of Parliament (MP) for Bramber to replace Sir Thomas Bowyer, the royalist member who had been ejected. He belonged to the political and religious group known as Independents who were opposed to any compromise in Parliament's negotiations with the King. As a result, he was one of the MPs allowed to remain after Pride's Purge – a military coup that excluded from Parliament roughly three quarters of the MPs, particularly those who were believed to be unsympathetic to the Army. In January 1649, the army and the Independents decided to bring Charles I to trial. Temple was one of the judges named to the High Court of Justice that conducted the trial. He attended nine sessions of the court in both the Painted Chamber and Westminster Hall. He approved the guilty verdict and signed the King's death warrant – the 28th of the 59 judges to do so.

During the early part of the Commonwealth period, he continued to serve on Parliamentary committees. However, he attracted accusations of corruption. In September 1650, these accusations led to him giving up his post at Tilbury Fort. It was probably around this time that he married his second wife, Joanna van Tromp.

Temple attracted a number of other accusations of financial impropriety, although apparently nothing was proved. In 1648, he was ordered by the House of Commons to respond to the legal action of one Elizabeth Willan who had attempted to serve him with two writs in connection with a bond for £400. He "threw them on the ground and spurned them with his foot". In 1649, Temple became the guardian of the daughter of one Mrs Eyre. He apparently "inveigled" her to marry his son, Alexander. As a result, Temple acquired the deeds to property in Ireland which he subsequently refused to return. A few years later, he was accused of improperly benefiting from administering the estate of a prominent Sussex catholic – Sir John Shelley – whose heir was a minor.

Following Temple's marriage, his father had invested in a farming venture by Edward Whalley who was the brother-in-law of Temple's stepsister – Mary Penistone. Sir Alexander apparently intended this to provide an inheritance for his grandchildren (the children of James Temple). As a younger son himself, Sir Alexander wanted to ensure suitable provision for his own younger son. This investment made by Temple's father for the benefit of his children had apparently become valueless when Edward Whalley fled to Scotland in the late 1630s. However, in the 1650s, Whalley had become a prominent and successful member of the Puritan establishment and there was a possibility of recovering some money. In the late 1650s, Temple and Whalley went to the Court of Chancery to determine what was due to Temple and his children. However, with the death of Oliver Cromwell and the subsequent restoration of Charles II, both regicides were faced with the possibility of execution and the case appears to have been unresolved.

== Restoration ==
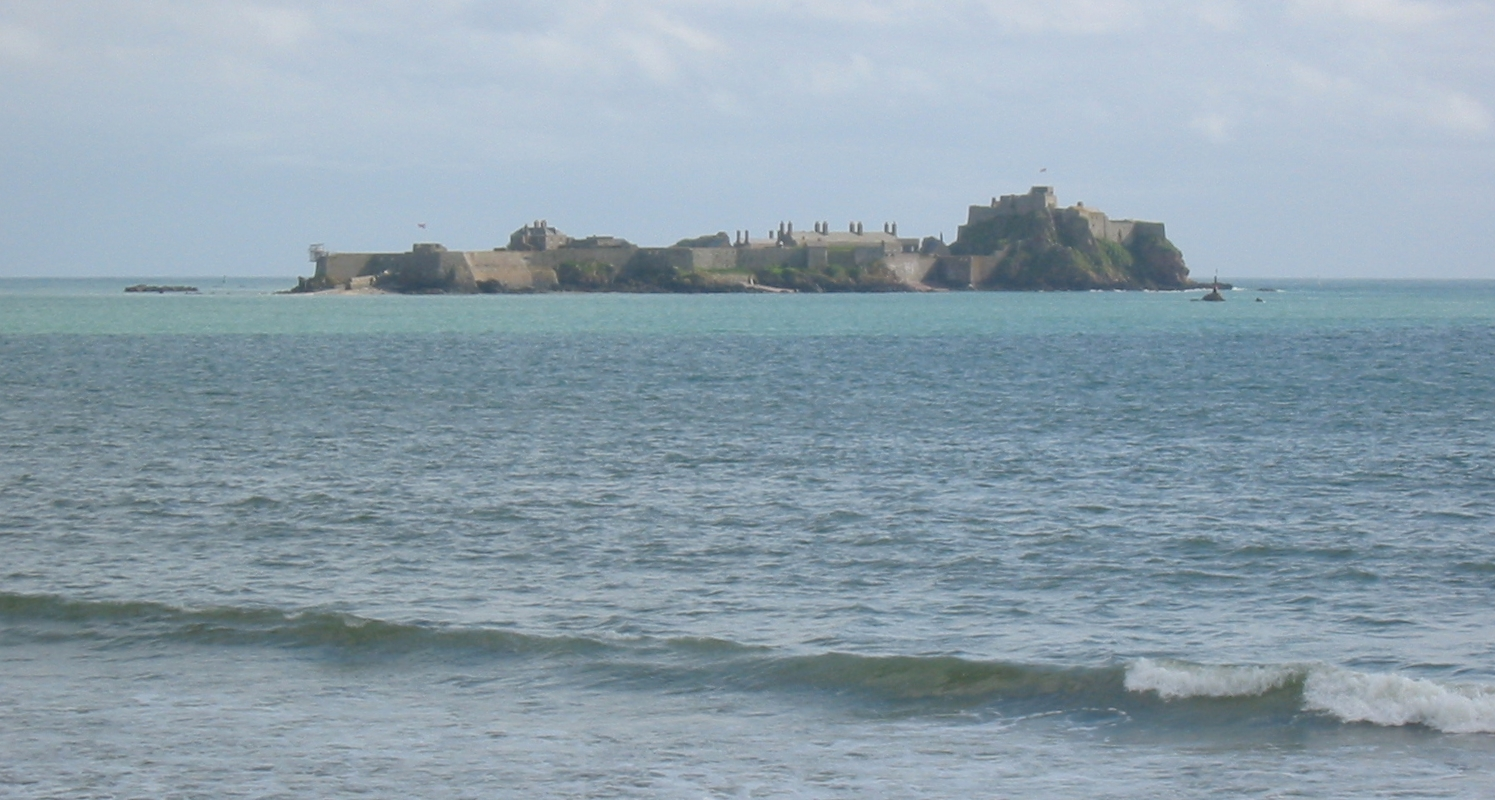
Elizabeth Castle, Jersey, where Temple died in 1680

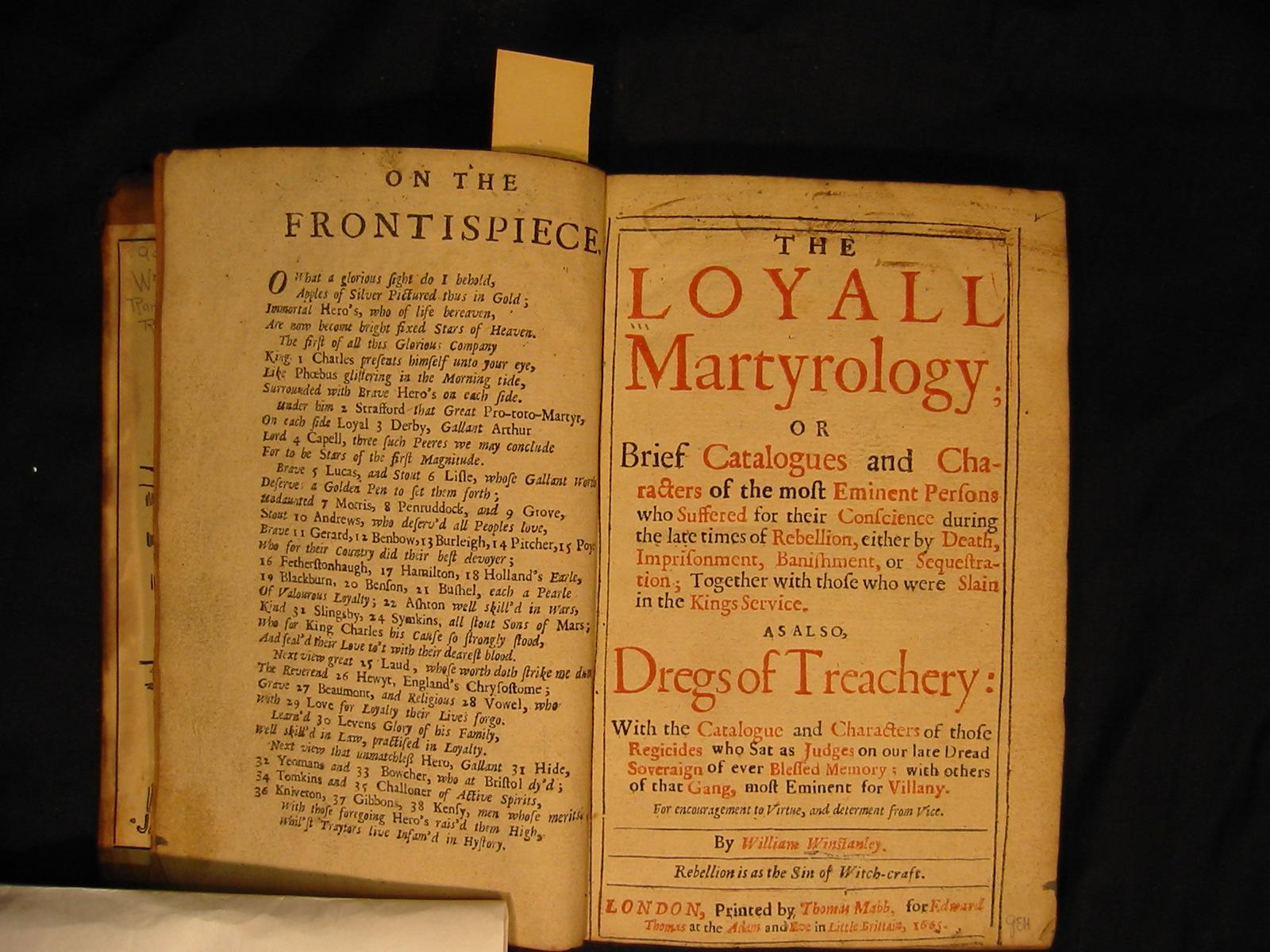
Winstanley's Martyrology, where Temple is described in unflattering terms

Temple returned to Parliament with the recall of the Rump and Long Parliaments by General Monck, but following the Restoration in 1660, he was excluded from the Indemnity and Oblivion Act, because of his role in the trial and execution of Charles I. He was captured in Warwickshire while trying to travel to Ireland, under his first wife's maiden name of Busbridge. He was held in the Tower of London before being tried as a regicide. He tried to avoid the death penalty by saying that he had only acted as a judge in Charles I's trial in order to give information to the Royalists. He went on to claim that he had tried to prevent the King's execution, begging Oliver Cromwell to spare him. He did avoid execution and was sentenced to life imprisonment. As a result of security concerns, a number of regicides, including Temple were sent to Jersey in the Channel Islands. Initially he was imprisoned in Mont Orgueil, and subsequently in Elizabeth Castle, where he is reported to have died on 17 February 1680.

William Winstanley described him as "not so much famous for his valour as his villainy, being remarkable for nothing but this horrible business of the king's murther, for which he came into the pack to have a share in the spoyle."

Parliament of England
Preceded by Arthur Onslow	Member of Parliament for Bramber; 1640–1642; With: Arthur Onslow	Succeeded by Bramber was unrepresented in the Barebones Parliament and the First and Second Parliaments of the Protectorate
Preceded by John Byne; John Fagg	Member of Parliament for Bramber; 1649–1650; With: One seat vacant	Succeeded by John Byne; Edward Eversfield
