= Anna Marie Roos =

Historian of early modern English science

Anna Marie Roos is a historian of early modern English science, noted for her research on the early Royal Society. She is an emeritus professor in the School of Humanities and Heritage at the University of Lincoln, a Fellow of the Society of Antiquaries, a Fellow of the Linnean Society, a fellow of the Royal Historical Society, and the former Editor-in-Chief of Notes and Records. She is also an affiliate of the History and Philosophy of Science Department at the University of Cambridge.

== Career ==
Anna Marie Roos obtained a PhD in history from the University of Colorado Boulder in 1997. She was an assistant and then associate professor at the University of Minnesota Duluth from 1999 to 2006, The Lister Research Fellow at the University of Oxford from 2009 to 2012, and a research associate at the Museum for the History of Science in Oxford from 2009 to 2013. Roos was a visiting fellow at All Souls College, Oxford, Huntington Fellow and Beinecke Fellow (declined) in 2017.

In 2013, Roos joined the University of Lincoln, where she remained until her retirement in July 2024. She served as editor-in-chief of Notes and Records from 2018 to 2024.

Roos was elected a fellow of the Society of Antiquaries in 2013. She is also a fellow of the Linnean Society of London and the Royal Historical Society.

She serves on the editorial board of The British Journal for the History of Science and the Journal of the History of Collections. She delivered the Gideon de Laune Lecture at the Worshipful Society of Apothecaries in 2023, and the Bynum Lecture at the Royal Society of Medicine in 2024. She is a visiting fellow at Clare Hall, Cambridge during the 2025-2026 academic year.

== Research and scholarly contributions ==
=== Salt chemistry and the discovery of oxygen ===
Roos is noted for her work in Salt of the Earth demonstrating that the late 18th-century discovery of oxygen emerged from a 150-year English tradition of salt chemistry and iatrochemistry, reframing conventional narratives of the Chemical Revolution. In The Salt of the Earth: Natural Philosophy, Medicine, and Chymistry in England, 1650–1750(Brill, 2007), she traced how English natural philosophers and physicians gradually shifted their focus from salts as fundamental principles of matter to acids as active chemical agents.

Her research demonstrated that 17th-century figures including William Simpson, Isaac Newton, Bryan Robinson, and Stephen Hales developed theories about atmospheric acids and "saline spirits" as vital principles responsible for respiration, combustion, and material transformation. Roos argued that this intellectual tradition provided the conceptual framework for Antoine Lavoisier's identification of oxygen as the "acidifying principle" (principe acidifiant) in the 1770s–1780s.

This work challenged conventional narratives that treat the Chemical Revolution primarily as a French development centered on the phlogiston debate, instead revealing its roots in earlier English iatrochemistry, Helmontian medicine, and Newtonian natural philosophy. Her analysis showed how the concept of a vital "volatile salt" was gradually modified into an understanding of atmospheric acids, which Lavoisier then identified as oxygen—a term meaning "acid-maker" that reflects this earlier tradition even though the theory of universal acidification was later disproven.

Building on her work on salt chemistry, Roos has explored Isaac Newton's chemical investigations and their influence on 18th-century natural philosophy. She analyzed Newton's De Natura Acidorum (1710) and its impact on physicians and chemists who developed theories about acids, fermentation, and atmospheric chemistry. Her research on figures like Bryan Robinson demonstrated how Newtonian ideas about acidic particles and the aether were applied to respiratory physiology and medical practice.

=== Martin Lister and natural history ===
Roos has published extensively on the naturalist and physician Martin Lister (1639–1712), a fellow of the Royal Society. Her work includes the first comprehensive scholarly edition of Lister's correspondence, published in multiple volumes by Brill (2015–2025), for which she received the John C. Thackray Medal from the Society for the History of Natural History.

In Martin Lister and his Remarkable Daughters (Bodleian Library, 2018; Chinese translation 2024), Roos documented how Lister's daughters Anna and Susanna created the scientific illustrations for Historiae Conchyliorum, making them among the first women to use microscopes for scientific illustration. She showed that Lister employed his daughters because he considered professional illustrators insufficiently reliable for scientific precision. This work contributed to the emerging field of women's participation in early modern science and was featured in the Guardian.

Her Web of Nature: Martin Lister (1639–1712), the First Arachnologist (Brill, 2011) established Lister's foundational contributions to the study of spiders and other arachnids and to the history of molluscs.

=== Martin Folkes and the 18th-century Royal Society ===
Roos's Martin Folkes (1690–1754): Newtonian, Antiquary, Connoisseur (Oxford University Press, 2021) provided the first comprehensive biography of the only simultaneous president of the Royal Society and the Society of Antiquaries of London. The study examined Folkes's contributions to Newtonian science, numismatics, and antiquarianism, illuminating the intellectual culture of the early Georgian Royal Society in which antiquarianism and natural philosophy mutually influenced each other intellectually.

Her edition of Folkes's Grand Tour travel diary, Taking Newton On Tour (Boydell and Brewer with the Hakluyt Society, 2025), reveals how natural philosophical networks operated across Europe in the early eighteenth century, as well as the development of the ‘Scientific Grand Tour’ and scientific diplomacy.

=== Other Works ===
Roos's early book Luminaries in the Natural World: The Sun and Moon in England, 1400–1720 (Peter Lang, 2001) examined changing conceptions of celestial bodies from the late medieval through early modern periods.

She has also written for general audiences, including Goldfish (Reaktion Books, 2019), part of the publisher's Animal series exploring cultural and natural history. The book was the subject of an author interview for National Geographic

Roos has also made contributions to work on early taxonomy on the Asian Elephant which received press attention. She also was consulted to help resolve the protracted debates about the taxonomic naming of the Aldabra Tortoise.

During the COVID-19 pandemic, she was interviewed by National Geographic on historical plague outbreaks and quarantine practices in early modern Venice.

Roos has edited several scholarly volumes on early modern knowledge-making and collecting practices, including Collective Wisdom: Collecting in the Early Modern Academy (2022) and Archival Afterlives: Life, Death, and Knowledge-Making in Early Modern British Scientific and Medical Archives (2018).

== Recognition and Impact ==
Roos's work on Martin Lister's correspondence was awarded the John C. Thackray Medal as well as the Founders’ Medal by the Society for the History of Natural History. Her research has been reviewed in major journals including Isis, the British Journal for the History of Science, and the Bulletin of the History of Medicine. She has been a guest on In Our Time concerning the life and work of Robert Boyle. Roos also helped found the Lisa Jardine Grant Scheme in the Royal Society to provide support to early career researchers.

The Salt of the Earth has been recognized as an important contribution to understanding the conceptual genealogy of modern chemistry, with reviewers noting that it "meets a high scholarly standard" and that "Roos has identified an extremely important component of the history of early modern chymistry".

== Selected publications ==
- The Correspondence of Dr. Martin Lister: (1639—1712). Volume Two: 1678—1694, Brill, 2025.
- Taking Newton On Tour: The Grand Tour Travel Diary Of Martin Folkes (1690–1754). Boydell and Brewer with the Hakluyt Society, October 2025.
- Edited with Gideon Manning, Collecting Wisdom of the Early Modern Scholar: Essays in Honor of Mordechai Feingold. Springer, 2023.
- Edited with Vera Keller, Collective Wisdom: Collecting in the Early Modern Academy. Brepols, 2022.
- Martin Folkes (1690-1754): Newtonian, Antiquary, Connoisseur. Oxford University Press, 2021.
- Goldfish. Reaktion Books, Animal series, 2019.
- With Vera Keller and Elizabeth Yale, Archival afterlives: life, death, and knowledge-making in early modern British scientific and medical archives. Brill, 2018
- Martin Lister and His Remarkable Daughters: The Art of Science in the Seventeenth Century. Bodleian Publishing, 2018.
- The correspondence of Dr Martin Lister (1639-1712) [Volume one 1662-1677]. Brill, 2015. Winner of the John Thackray Medal, Society of the History of Natural History.
- Web of Nature: Martin Lister (1639-1712), the first arachnologist. Brill, 2011.
- The salt of the earth: natural philosophy, medicine and chymistry in England, 1650-1750. Brill, 2007.
- Luminaries in the natural world: the sun and moon in England, 1400-1720. Peter Lang, 2001.
