= William Pitt, 1st Earl of Chatham =

Prime Minister of Great Britain 1766–1768 (1708–1778)

The Right Honourable The Earl of Chatham PC FRS
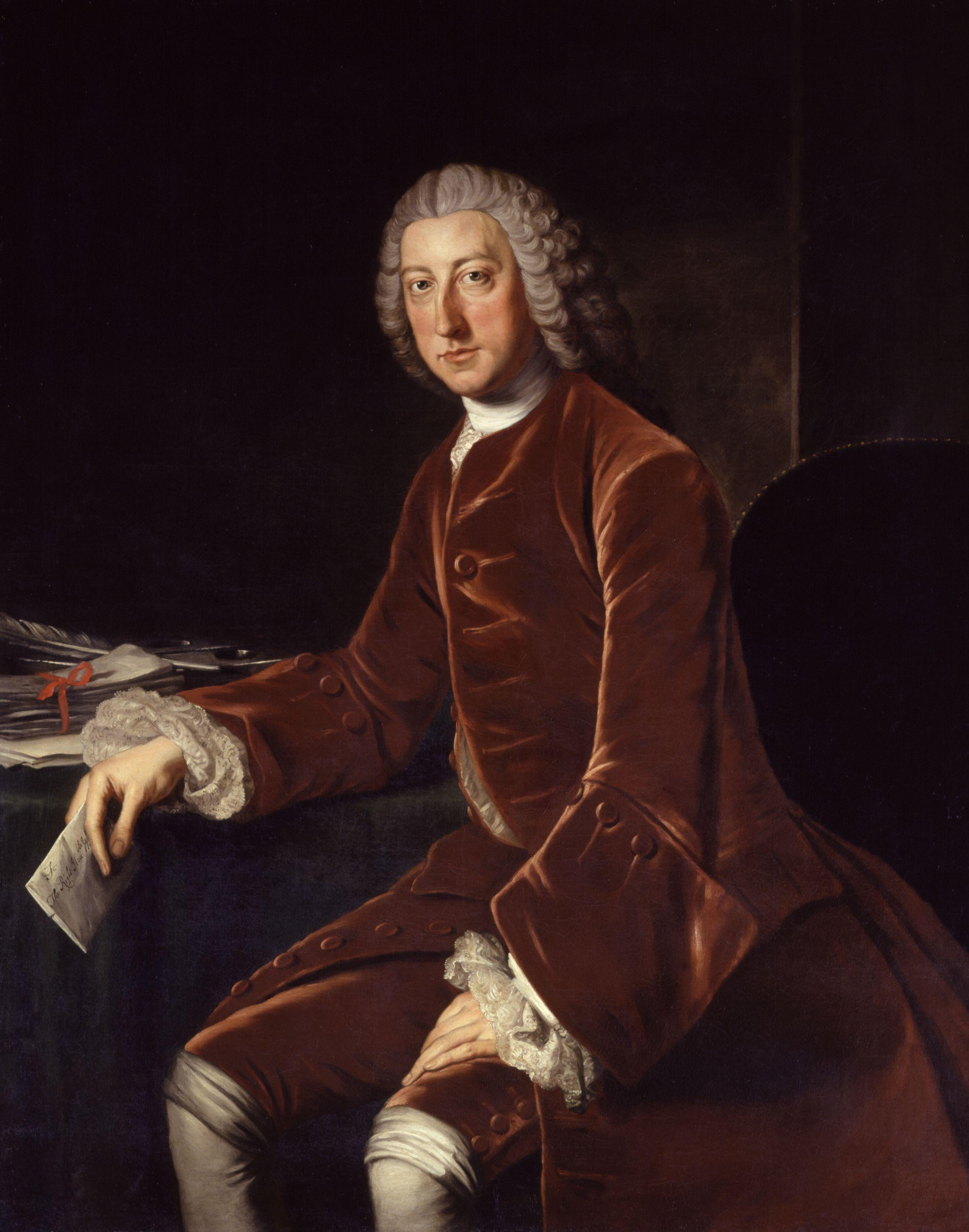
- Portrait by William Hoare, c. 1754

Prime Minister of Great Britain
- In office 30 July 1766 – 14 October 1768
- Monarch: George III
- Preceded by: The Marquess of Rockingham
- Succeeded by: The Duke of Grafton

Lord Privy Seal
- In office 30 July 1766 – 14 October 1768
- Preceded by: The Duke of Newcastle
- Succeeded by: The Earl of Bristol

Leader of the House of Commons
- In office 27 June 1757 – 6 October 1761
- Preceded by: Himself
- Succeeded by: George Grenville
- In office 4 December 1756 – 6 April 1757
- Preceded by: Henry Fox
- Succeeded by: Himself

Secretary of State for the Southern Department
- In office 27 June 1757 – 5 October 1761
- Preceded by: The Earl of Holderness
- Succeeded by: The Earl of Egremont
- In office 4 December 1756 – 6 April 1757
- Preceded by: Henry Fox
- Succeeded by: The Earl of Holderness

Paymaster of the Forces
- In office 29 October 1746 – 25 November 1755
- Preceded by: Thomas Winnington
- Succeeded by: The Earl of Darlington; The Earl of Kinnoull

Member of Parliament
- In office 18 February 1735 – 4 August 1766
- Preceded by: Thomas Pitt
- Succeeded by: John Smith
- Constituency: Old Sarum (1735–1747); Seaford (1747–1754); Aldborough (1754–1756); Okehampton (1756–1757); Bath (1757–1766)

Personal details
- Born: William Pitt; 15 November 1708 Westminster, London, England
- Died: 11 May 1778 (aged 69) Hayes, Kent (now in the London Borough of Bromley), England
- Resting place: Westminster Abbey, England
- Party: Whig
- Spouse: Hester Grenville (m. 1754)
- Children: 5; including Hester, John, and William
- Parent(s): Robert Pitt (father); Harriet Villiers (mother)
- Relatives: Pitt family
- Education: Eton College
- Alma mater: Trinity College, Oxford; Utrecht University

Military service
- Allegiance: Kingdom of Great Britain
- Branch/service: British Army
- Unit: King's Own Regiment of Horse

William Pitt, 1st Earl of Chatham (15 November 1708 – 11 May 1778) was a British Whig statesman who served as Prime Minister of Great Britain from 1766 to 1768. Historians call him "Chatham" or "Pitt the Elder" to distinguish him from his son William Pitt the Younger, who also served as prime minister. Pitt was also known as "the Great Commoner" because of his long-standing refusal to accept a title until 1766.

Pitt was a member of the British cabinet and with a brief interlude in 1757, its informal leader from 1756 to 1761, during the Seven Years' War (including the French and Indian War in the American colonies). He again led the ministry, holding the official title of Lord Privy Seal, between 1766 and 1768. Much of his power came from his brilliant oratory. He was out of power for most of his career and became well known for his attacks on the government, such as those on Walpole's corruption in the 1730s, Hanoverian subsidies in the 1740s, peace with France in the 1760s, and the policy toward the American colonies during the 1770s.

Pitt is best known as the wartime political leader of Britain during the Seven Years' War, especially for his single-minded devotion to victory over France, a victory that ultimately solidified Britain's dominance over world affairs. He is also known for his popular appeal, his opposition to corruption in government, his support for the American position in the run-up to the American Revolutionary War, his advocacy of British greatness, expansionism and empire, and his antagonism toward Britain's chief enemies and rivals for colonial power, Spain and France. Marie Peters argues his statesmanship was based on a clear, consistent and distinct appreciation of the value of the Empire.

The British parliamentary historian P. D. G. Thomas argued that Pitt's power was based not on his family connections, but on the extraordinary parliamentary skills by which he dominated the House of Commons. He displayed a commanding manner, brilliant rhetoric and sharp debating skills that cleverly used his broad literary and historical knowledge. Scholars rank him highly among all British prime ministers.

== Early life ==
=== Family ===
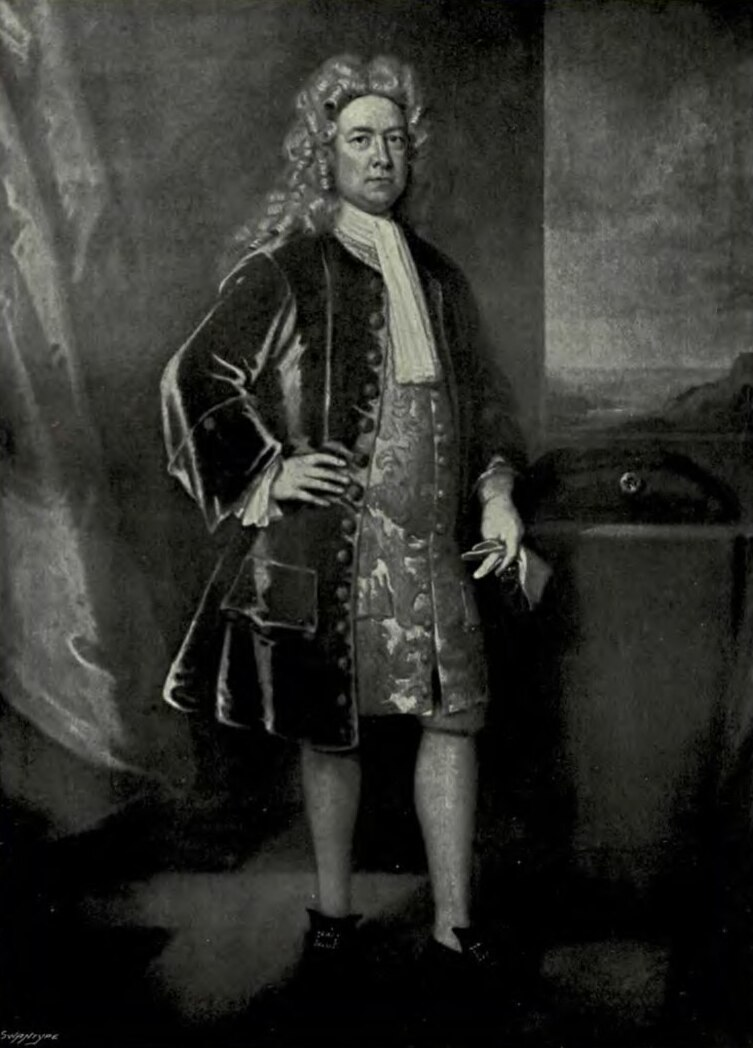
Pitt's grandfather Thomas

Pitt was the grandson of Thomas Pitt (1653–1726), the governor of Madras, known as "Diamond" Pitt for having discovered a diamond of extraordinary size and having sold it to the Duke of Orléans for approximately £135,000. This transaction, as well as other trading deals in India, established the Pitt family fortune. After returning home the governor was able to raise his family to a position of wealth and political influence: in 1691, he purchased the property of Boconnoc in Cornwall, which gave him control of a seat in Parliament. He made further land purchases and became one of the dominant political figures in the West Country, controlling seats such as the rotten borough of Old Sarum.

William's mother was Harriet Villiers, the daughter of Edward Villiers-FitzGerald and the Irish heiress Katherine FitzGerald. William's father was Robert Pitt (1680–1727), the eldest son of Governor Pitt. He served as a Tory Member of Parliament from 1705 to 1727. at Eton College along with his brother. William disliked Eton, later claiming that "a public school might suit a boy of turbulent disposition but would not do where there was any gentleness". It was at school that Pitt began to suffer from gout. Governor Pitt died in 1726, and the family estate at Boconnoc passed to William's father. When he died the following year, Boconnoc was inherited by William's elder brother].

In January 1727, William was entered as a gentleman commoner at Trinity College, Oxford. There is evidence that he was an extensive reader, if not a minutely accurate classical scholar. Virgil was his favourite author. William diligently cultivated the faculty of expression by the practice of translation and re-translation. In these years he became a close friend of George Lyttelton, who would later become a leading politician. In 1728, a violent attack of gout compelled him to leave Oxford without finishing his degree. He then chose to travel abroad, from 1728 attending Utrecht University in the Dutch Republic, gaining a knowledge of Hugo Grotius and other writers on international law and diplomacy. It is not known how long Pitt studied at Utrecht but, by 1730, he had returned to his brother's estate at Boconnoc.

He had recovered from the violent attack of gout, but the disease proved intractable, and he continued to be subject to attacks of growing intensity at frequent intervals until his death.

=== Military career ===
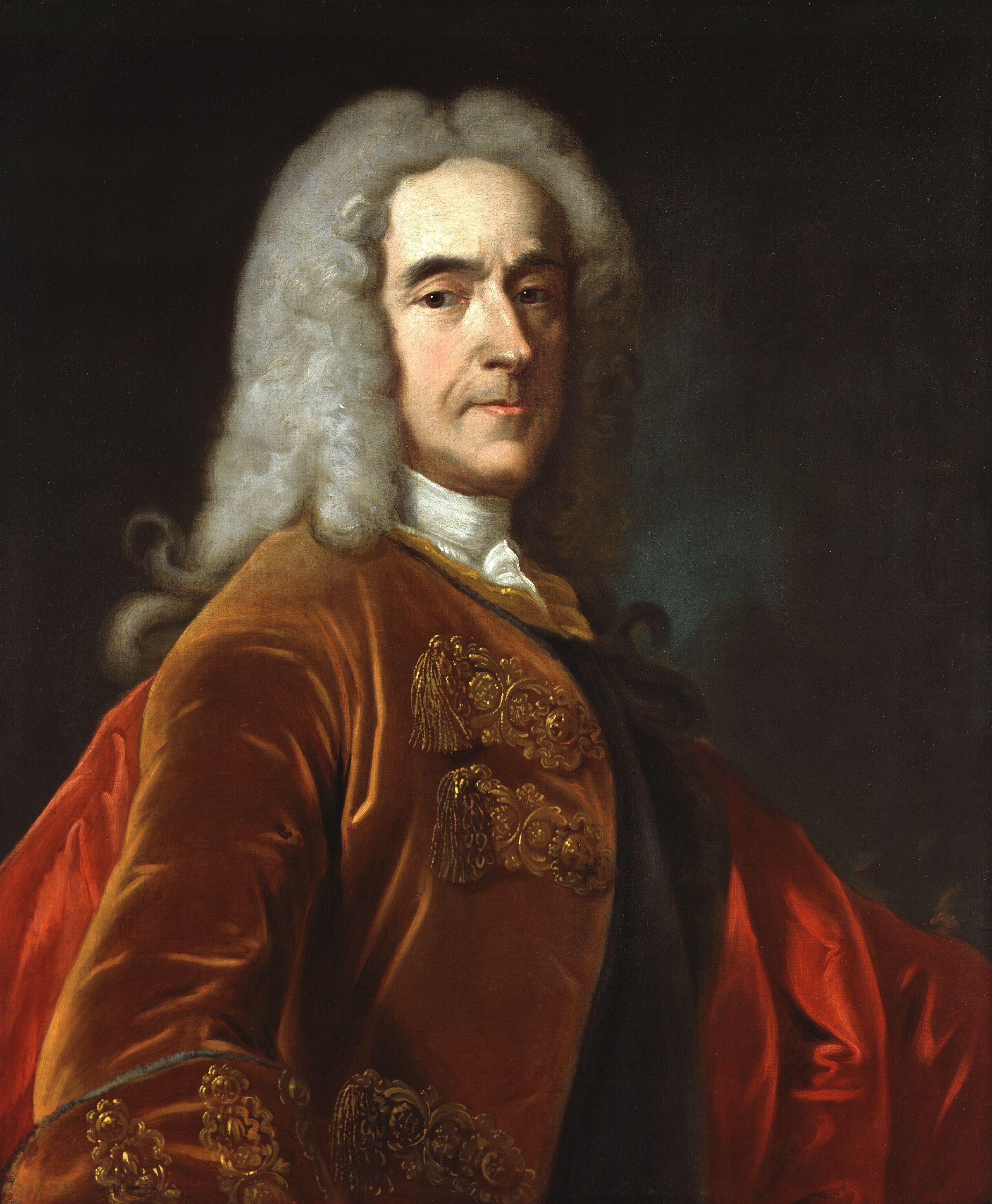
Lord Cobham, Pitt's commanding officer and political mentor. Pitt was part of a group of young MPs known as Cobham's Cubs.

On Pitt's return home it was necessary for him, as the younger son, to choose a profession and he opted for a career in the army. He obtained a cornet's commission in the dragoons with the King's Own Regiment of Horse (later 1st King's Dragoon Guards). George II never forgot the jibes of "the terrible cornet of horse". It was reported that the £1,000 cost of the commission had been supplied by Robert Walpole, the prime minister, out of Treasury funds in an attempt to secure the support of Pitt's brother Thomas in Parliament. Alternatively, the fee may have been waived by the commanding officer of the regiment, Lord Cobham, who was related to the Pitt brothers by marriage.

Pitt grew close to Cobham, whom he regarded as almost a surrogate father. He was stationed for much of his service in Northampton, on peacetime duties. Pitt was particularly frustrated that he had not been tested in battle since Britain had not entered the War of the Polish Succession that began in 1733 owing to Walpole's isolationist policies. Pitt was granted extended leave in 1733 and he toured France and Switzerland. He briefly visited Paris, but spent most of his time in the French provinces, spending the winter in Lunéville in the Duchy of Lorraine.

Pitt's military career was destined to be relatively short. His elder brother Thomas was returned at the general election of 1734 for two separate seats, Okehampton and Old Sarum, and chose to sit for Okehampton, passing the vacant seat to William who, accordingly, in February 1735, entered parliament as member for Old Sarum. He became one of a large number of serving army officers in the House of Commons.

== Rise to prominence ==
=== Patriot Whigs ===
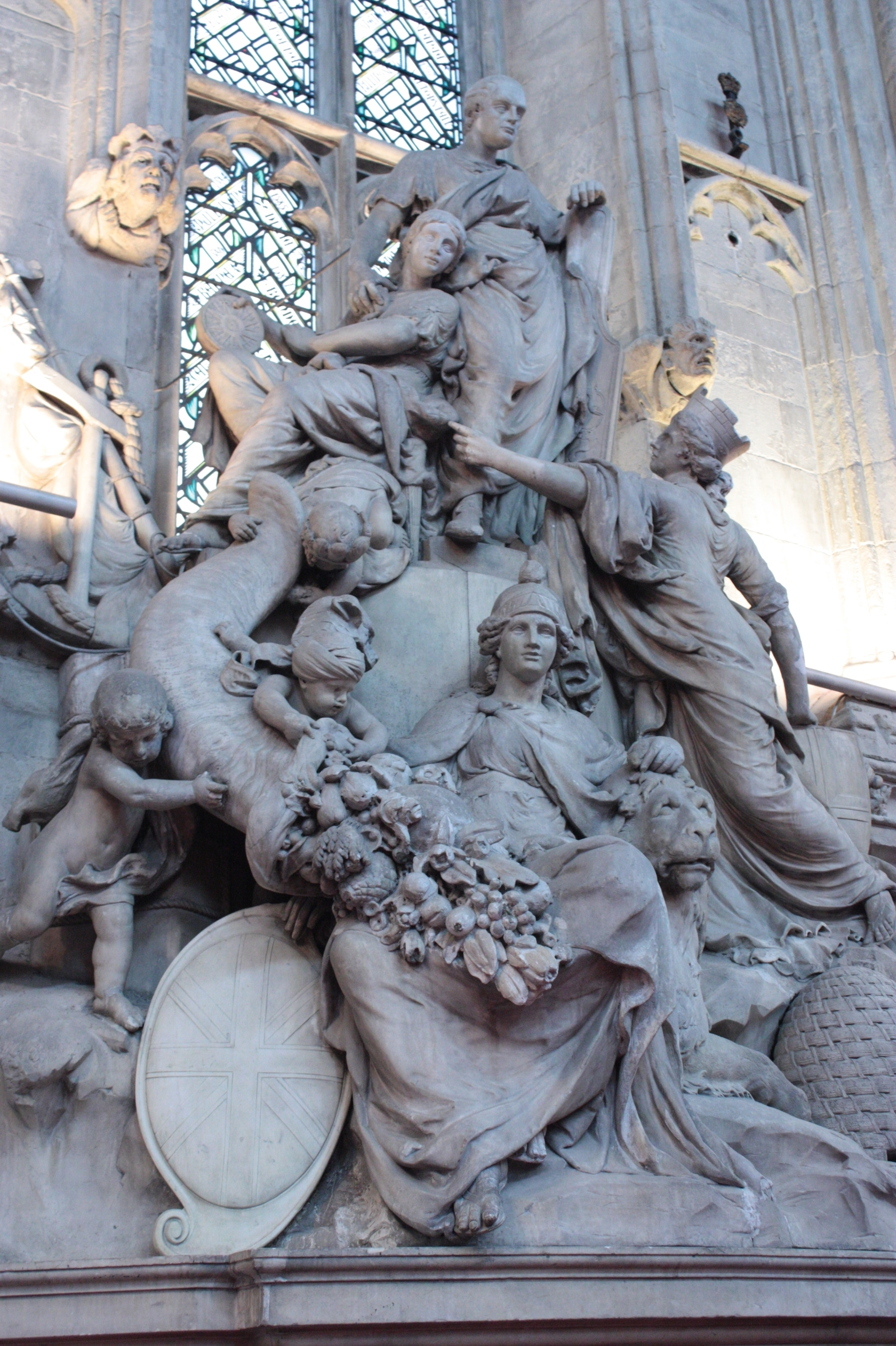
The huge monument to William Pitt the Elder, in the Guildhall, London stands opposite an equally huge monument to his son, William Pitt the Younger in a balanced composition

Pitt soon joined a faction of discontented Whigs known as the Patriots who formed part of the opposition. The group commonly met at Stowe House, the country estate of Lord Cobham, who was a leader of the group. Cobham had originally been a supporter of the government under Sir Robert Walpole, but a dispute over the controversial Excise Bill of 1733 had seen them join the opposition. Pitt swiftly became one of the faction's most prominent members.

Pitt's maiden speech in the Commons was delivered in April 1736, in the debate on the congratulatory address to George II on the marriage of his son Frederick, Prince of Wales. He used the occasion to pay compliments, and there was nothing striking in the speech as reported, but it helped to gain him the attention of the House when he later took part on debates on more partisan subjects. In particular, he attacked Britain's non-intervention in the ongoing European war, which he believed was in violation of the Treaty of Vienna and the terms of the Anglo-Austrian Alliance.

He became such a troublesome critic of the government that Walpole moved to punish him by arranging his dismissal from the army in 1736, along with several of his friends and political allies. This provoked a wave of hostility to Walpole because many saw such an act as unconstitutional—that members of Parliament were being dismissed for their freedom of speech in attacking the government, something protected by Parliamentary privilege. None of the men had their commissions reinstated, however, and the incident brought an end to Pitt's military career. The loss of Pitt's commission was soon compensated. The heir to the throne, Frederick, Prince of Wales, was involved in a long-running dispute with his father, George II, and was the patron of the opposition. He appointed Pitt one of his Grooms of the Bedchamber as a reward. In this new position Pitt's hostility to the government did not in any degree relax, and his oratorical gifts were substantial.

=== War ===
==== Spanish war ====
During the 1730s Britain's relationship with Spain had slowly declined. Repeated cases of reported Spanish mistreatment of British merchants, whom they accused of smuggling, caused public outrage, particularly the incident of Jenkins' Ear. Pitt was a leading advocate of a more hard-line policy against Spain and he often castigated Walpole's government for its weakness in dealing with Madrid. Pitt spoke out against the Convention of El Pardo that aimed to settle the dispute peacefully. In the speech against the convention in the House of Commons on 8 March 1739 Pitt said:

When trade is at stake, it is your last entrenchment; you must defend it, or perish ... Sir, Spain knows the consequence of a war in America; whoever gains, it must prove fatal to her ... is this any longer a nation? Is this any longer an English Parliament, if with more ships in your harbours than in all the navies of Europe; with above two millions of people in your American colonies, you will bear to hear of the expediency of receiving from Spain an insecure, unsatisfactory, dishonourable Convention?

Owing to public pressure, the British government was pushed toward declaring war with Spain in 1739. Britain began with a success at Porto Bello. However the war effort soon stalled, and Pitt alleged that the government was not prosecuting the war effectively—demonstrated by the fact that the British waited two years before taking further offensive action fearing that further British victories would provoke the French into declaring war. When they did so, a failed attack was made on the South American port of Cartagena that left thousands of British troops dead, more than half from disease, and cost many ships. The decision to attack during the rainy season was held as further evidence of the government's incompetence.

After this, the colonial war against Spain was almost entirely abandoned as British resources were switched toward fighting France in Europe as the War of the Austrian Succession had broken out. The Spanish had repelled a major invasion intended to conquer Central America and succeeded in maintaining their trans-Atlantic convoys while causing much disruption to British shipping and twice broke a British blockade to land troops in Italy, but the war with Spain was treated as a draw. Many of the underlying issues remained unresolved by the later peace treaties leaving the potential for future conflicts to occur. Pitt considered the war a missed opportunity to take advantage of a power in decline, although later he became an advocate of warmer relations with the Spanish in an effort to prevent them forming an alliance with France.

==== Hanover ====
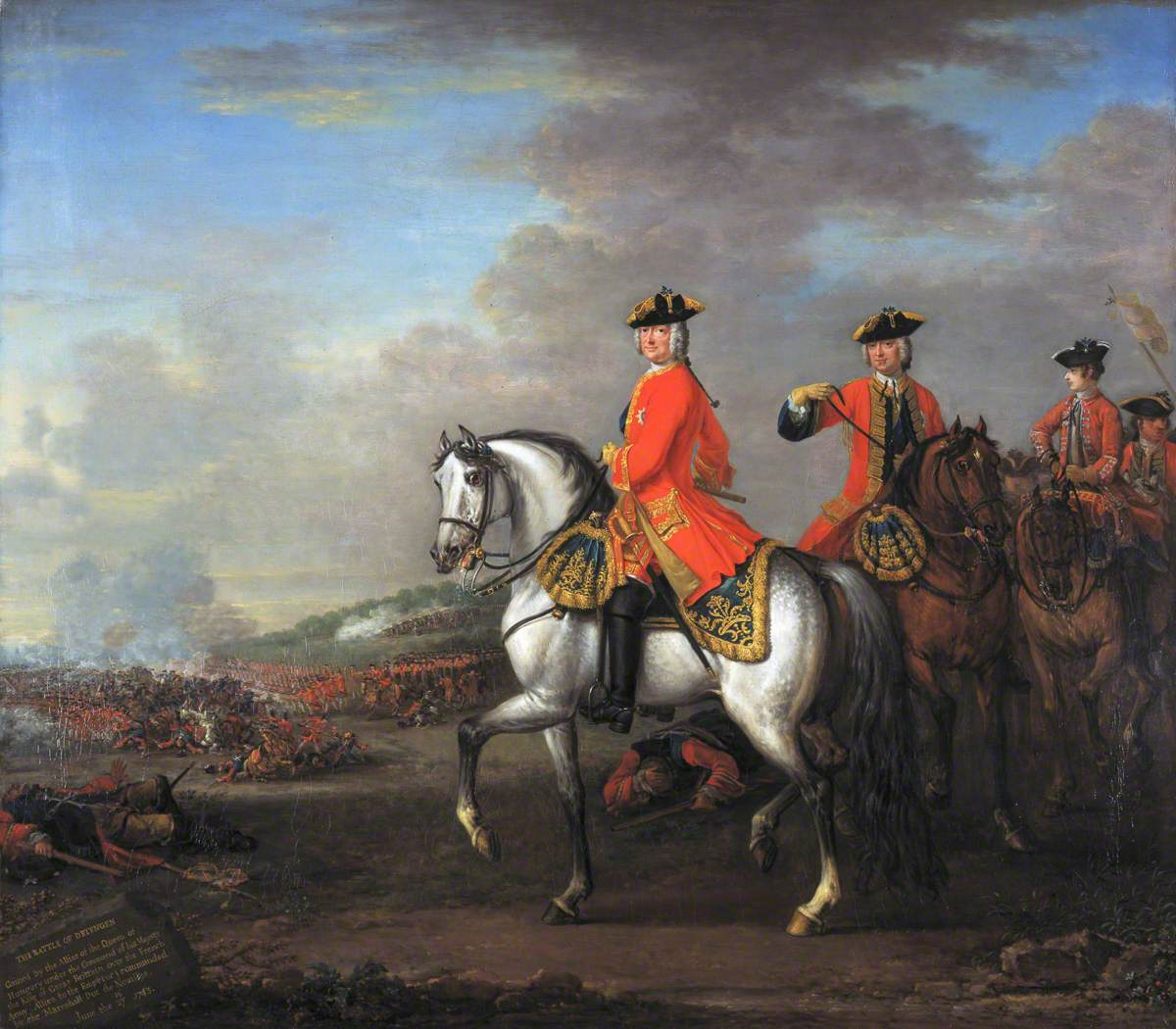
George II at the Battle of Dettingen by John Wootton. George II leading his forces to victory at the Battle of Dettingen (1743). Pitt incurred his lasting displeasure by attacking British support for Hanover, which would blight their relations for twenty years.

Walpole and Newcastle were now giving the war in Europe a much higher priority than the colonial conflict with Spain in the Americas. Prussia and Austria went to war in 1740, with many other European states soon joining in. There was a fear that France would launch an invasion of Hanover, which was linked to Britain through the crown of George II. To avert this, Walpole and Newcastle decided to pay a large subsidy to both Austria and Hanover, in order for them to raise troops and defend themselves.

Pitt then launched an attack on such subsidies, playing to widespread anti-Hanoverian feelings in Britain. This boosted his popularity with the public, but earned him the lifelong hatred of the King, who was emotionally committed to Hanover, where he had spent the first thirty years of his life. In response to Pitt's attacks, the British government decided not to pay a direct subsidy to Hanover, but instead to pass the money indirectly through Austria—a move that was considered more politically acceptable. A sizeable Anglo-German army was formed that George II led to victory at the Battle of Dettingen in 1743, reducing the immediate threat to Hanover.

=== Fall of Walpole ===
Many of Pitt's attacks on the government were directed personally at Walpole, who had now been prime minister for twenty years. He spoke in favour of the motion in 1742 for an inquiry into the last ten years of Walpole's administration. In February 1742, following poor election results and the disaster at Cartagena, Walpole finally was forced to succumb to the long-continued attacks of opposition, he resigned and took a peerage.

Pitt now expected a new government to be formed led by Pulteney and dominated by Tories and Patriot Whigs in which he could expect a junior position. Instead, Walpole was succeeded as prime minister by Lord Wilmington, although the real power in the new government was divided among Lord Carteret and the Pelham brothers (Henry and Thomas, Duke of Newcastle). Walpole had carefully orchestrated this new government as a continuance of his own, and continued to advise it up to his death in 1745. Pitt's hopes for a place in the government were thwarted and he remained in opposition. He was therefore unable to make any personal gain from the downfall of Walpole, to which he had personally contributed a great deal.

After the dismissal of Carteret, the administration formed by the Pelhams in 1744 included many of Pitt's former Patriot allies, but Pitt was not granted a position because of continued ill-feeling by the king and leading Whigs about his views on Hanover. In 1744, Pitt received a large boost to his personal fortune when the Dowager Duchess of Marlborough died leaving him a legacy of £10,000 as an "acknowledgment of the noble defence he had made for the support of the laws of England and to prevent the ruin of his country". The inheritance was probably as much a mark of her dislike of Walpole as of her admiration of Pitt.

== In government ==
=== Paymaster of the Forces ===
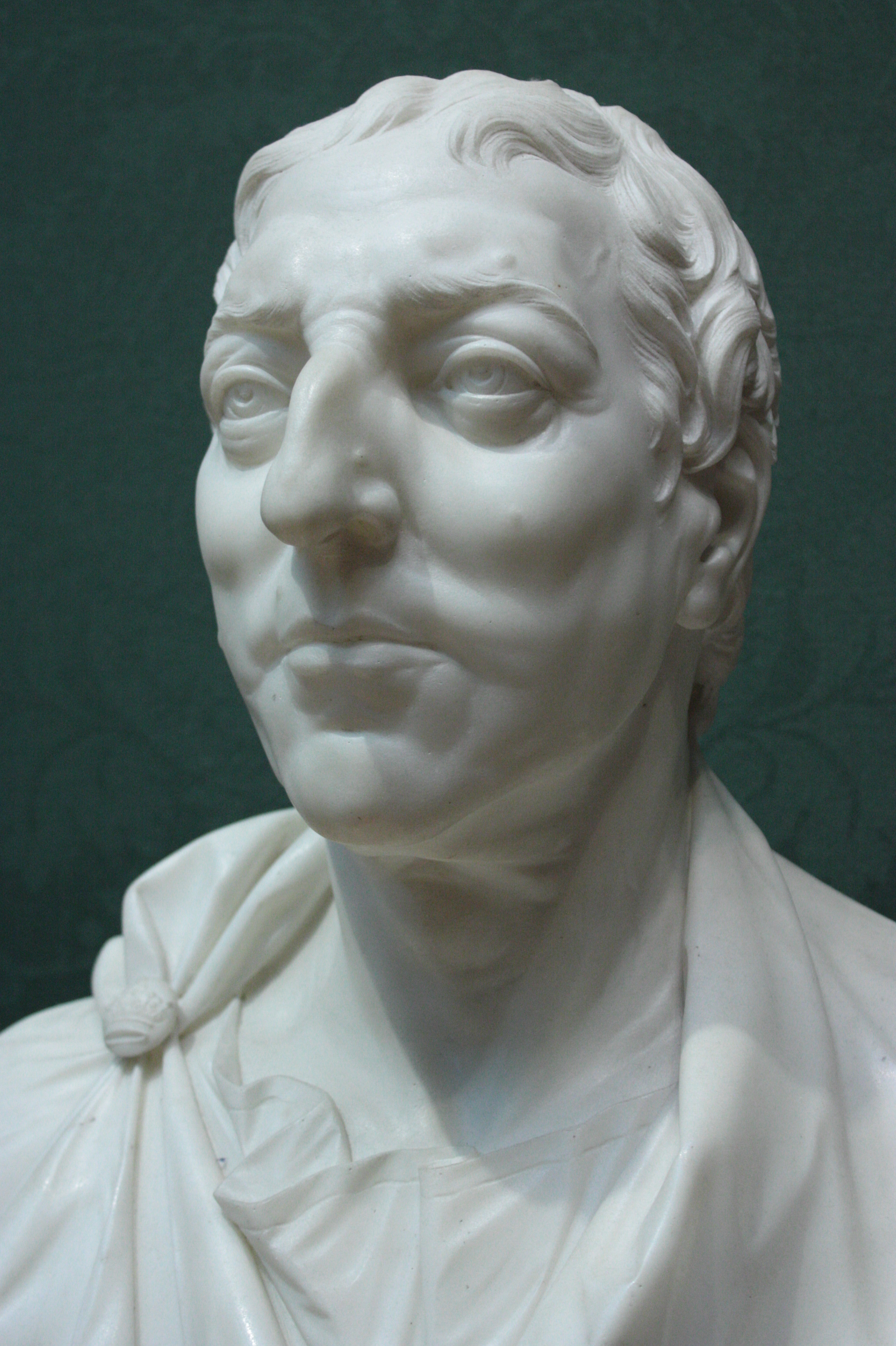
William Pitt the Elder, by Joseph Wilton, National Portrait Gallery, London

Reluctantly the king finally agreed to give Pitt a place in the government. Pitt had changed his stance on a number of issues to become more acceptable to George, most notably the heated issue of Hanoverian subsidies. To force the matter, the Pelham brothers had to resign on the question of whether he should be admitted or not, and it was only after all other arrangements had proved impracticable, that they were reinstated with Pitt appointed as Vice-Treasurer of Ireland in February 1746. George continued to resent him however.

In May of the same year Pitt was promoted to the more important and lucrative office of paymaster-general, which gave him a place in the Privy Council, although not in the cabinet. There he had an opportunity of displaying his public spirit and integrity in a way that deeply impressed both the king and the country. It had been the usual practise of previous paymasters to appropriate to themselves the interest of all money lying in their hands by way of advance, and also to accept a commission of 1/2% on all foreign subsidies. Although there was no strong public sentiment against the practice, Pitt completely refused to profit by it. All advances were lodged by him in the Bank of England until required, and all subsidies were paid over without deduction, even though it was pressed upon him, so that he did not draw a shilling from his office beyond the salary legally attaching to it. Pitt ostentatiously made this clear to everyone, although he was in fact following what Henry Pelham had done when he had held the post between 1730 and 1743. This helped to establish Pitt's reputation with the British people for honesty and placing the interests of the nation before his own.

The administration formed in 1746 lasted without major changes until 1754. It would appear from his published correspondence that Pitt had a greater influence in shaping its policy than his comparatively subordinate position would in itself have entitled him to. His support for measures, such as the Spanish Treaty and the continental subsidies, which he had violently denounced when in opposition was criticised by his enemies as an example of his political opportunism.

Between 1746 and 1748, Pitt worked closely with Newcastle in formulating British military and diplomatic strategy. He shared with Newcastle a belief that Britain should continue to fight until it could receive generous peace terms, in contrast to some such as Henry Pelham who favoured an immediate peace. Pitt was saddened when his friend and brother-in-law Thomas Grenville was killed at the naval First Battle of Cape Finisterre in 1747, however, this victory helped secure British supremacy of the sea that gave the British a stronger negotiating position when it came to the peace talks that ended the war. At the Treaty of Aix-la-Chapelle in 1748 British colonial conquests were exchanged for a French withdrawal from Brussels. Many saw this as merely an armistice and awaited an imminent new war.

=== Dispute with Newcastle ===
In 1754, Henry Pelham died suddenly and was succeeded as prime minister by his brother, the Duke of Newcastle. As Newcastle sat in the House of Lords, he required a leading politician to represent the government in the House of Commons. Pitt and Henry Fox were considered the two favourites for the position, but Newcastle instead rejected them both and turned to the less well-known figure of Sir Thomas Robinson, a career diplomat, to fill the post. It was widely believed that Newcastle had done this because he feared the ambitions of both Pitt and Fox, and believed he would find it easier to dominate the inexperienced Robinson.

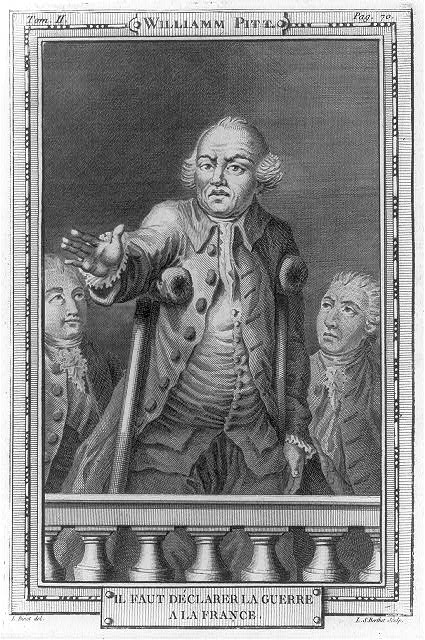
"We must declare war on France". This curious representation of William Pitt making a speech to Parliament wants to show his absolute opposition to France on colonial problems.

Despite his disappointment there was no immediate open breach. Pitt continued at his post; and at the general election that took place during the year, he even accepted a nomination for the Duke's pocket borough of Aldborough. He had sat for Seaford since 1747. The government won a landslide, further strengthening its majority in parliament.

When parliament met, however, he made no secret of his feelings. Ignoring Robinson, Pitt made frequent and vehement attacks on Newcastle, although still continuing to serve as Paymaster under him. From 1754, Britain was increasingly drawn into conflict with France during this period, despite Newcastle's wish to maintain the peace. The countries clashed in North America, where each had laid claim to the Ohio Country. A British expedition under General Braddock had been despatched and defeated in summer 1755 that caused a ratcheting up of tensions.

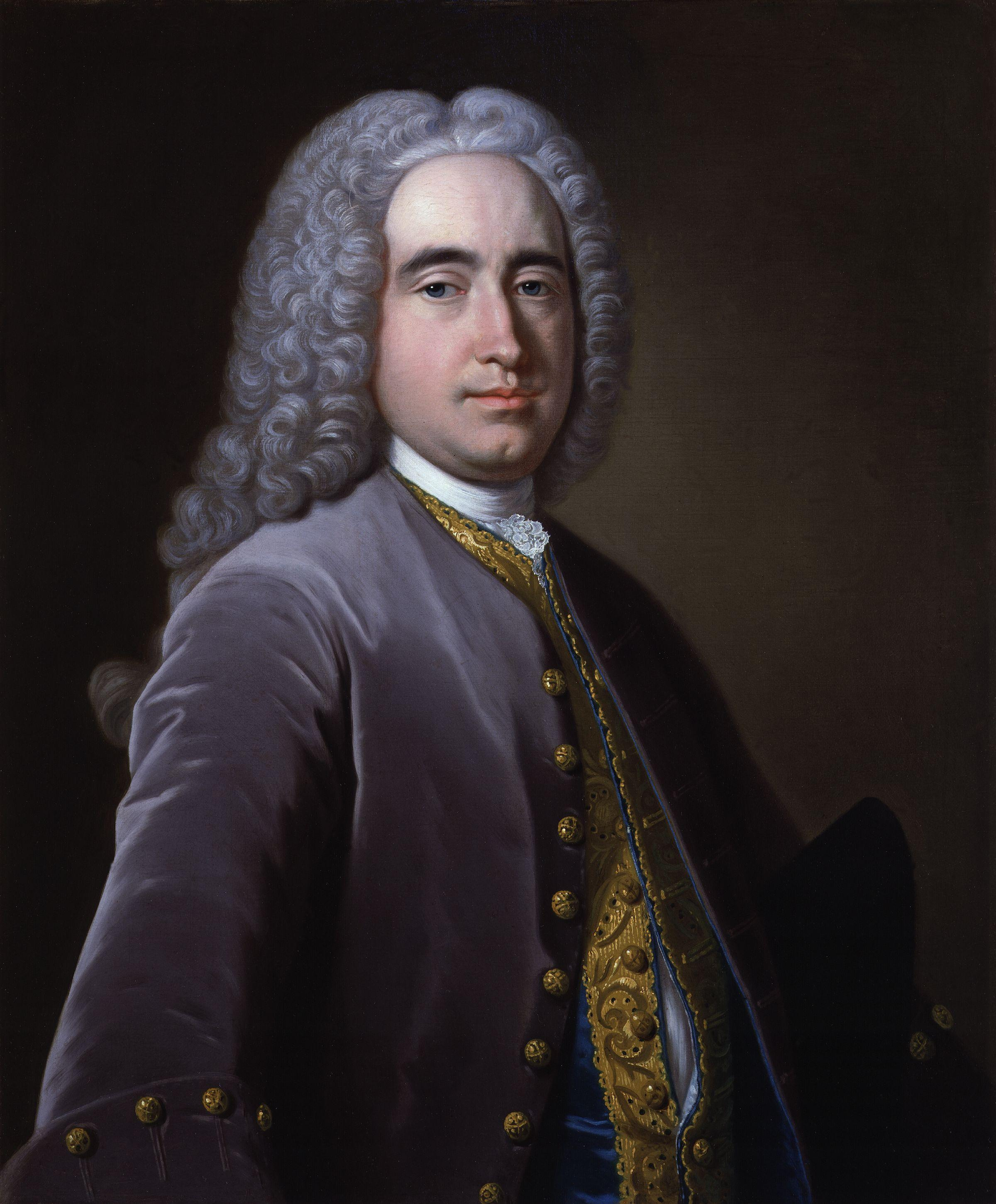
Pitt's longstanding rival Henry Fox

Eager to prevent the war spreading to Europe, Newcastle now tried to conclude a series of treaties that would secure Britain allies through the payment of subsidies, which he hoped would discourage France from attacking Britain. Similar subsidies had been an issue of past disagreement, and they were widely attacked by Patriot Whigs and Tories. As the government came under increasing attack, Newcastle replaced Robinson with Fox who it was acknowledged carried more political weight and again slighted Pitt.

Finally in November 1755, Pitt was dismissed from office as paymaster, having spoken during a debate at great length against the new system of continental subsidies proposed by the government of which he was still a member. Fox retained his own place, and although the two men continued to be of the same party, and afterward served again in the same government, there was henceforward a rivalry between them, which makes the celebrated opposition of their sons, William Pitt the Younger and Charles James Fox, seem like an inherited quarrel.

Pitt's relationship with the Duke slumped further in early 1756 when he alleged that Newcastle was deliberately leaving the island of Menorca ill-defended so that the French would seize it, and Newcastle could use its loss to prove that Britain was not able to fight a war against France and sue for peace. When in June 1756 Menorca fell after a failed attempt by Admiral Byng to relieve it, Pitt's allegations fuelled the public anger against Newcastle, leading him to be attacked by a mob in Greenwich. The loss of Menorca shattered public faith in Newcastle, and forced him to step down as prime minister in November 1756.

=== Secretary of State ===
In December 1756, Pitt, who now sat for Okehampton, became Secretary of State for the Southern Department, and Leader of the House of Commons under the premiership of the Duke of Devonshire. Upon entering this coalition, Pitt said to Devonshire: "My Lord, I am sure I can save this country, and no one else can".

He had made it a condition of his joining any administration that Newcastle should be excluded from it, which proved fatal to the lengthened existence of his government. With the king unfriendly, and Newcastle, whose influence was still dominant in the Commons, estranged, it was impossible to carry on a government by the aid of public opinion alone, however emphatically that might have declared itself on his side. The historian Basil Williams has claimed that this is the first time in British history when a "man was called to supreme power by the voice of the people" rather than by the king's appointment or, as the choice of Parliament.

Pitt drew up his plans for the campaigning season of 1757 in which he hoped to reverse Britain's string of defeats during the war's opening years.

In April 1757 Pitt was dismissed from office on account of his opposition to the continental policy and the circumstances surrounding the court-martial and execution of Admiral John Byng. He was succeeded by the Duke of Devonshire who formed the 1757 Caretaker Ministry. But the power that was insufficient to keep him in office was strong enough to make any arrangement that excluded him, impracticable. The public voice spoke in a way that was not to be mistaken. Probably no English minister ever received in so short a time so many proofs of the confidence and admiration of the public, the capital and all the chief towns voting him addresses and the freedom of their corporations (e.g., London presented him with the first ever honorary Freedom of the City awarded in history). Horace Walpole recorded the freedoms of various cities awarded to Pitt:

... for some weeks it rained gold boxes: Chester, Worcester, Norwich, Bedford, Salisbury, Yarmouth, Tewkesbury, Newcastle-on-Tyne, Stirling, and other populous and chief towns following the example. Exeter, with singular affection, sent boxes of oak.

After some weeks' negotiation, in the course of which the firmness and moderation of "The Great Commoner", as he had come to be called, contrasted favourably with the characteristic tortuosities of the crafty peer, matters were settled on such a basis that, while Newcastle was the nominal, Pitt was the virtual head of the government. On his acceptance of office, he was chosen member for Bath.

== Pitt–Newcastle ministry ==
=== Seven Years' War ===
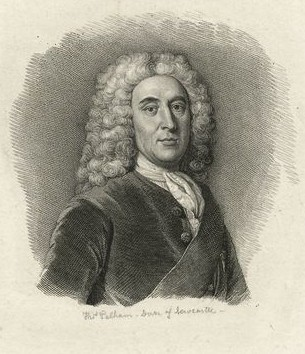
The Duke of Newcastle with whom Pitt formed an unlikely political partnership from 1757

A coalition with Newcastle was formed in June 1757, and held power until October 1761. It brought together several various factions and was built around the partnership between Pitt and Newcastle, which a few months earlier had seemed impossible. The two men used Lord Chesterfield as an intermediary and had managed to agree a division of powers that was acceptable to both. For the past few months Britain had been virtually leaderless, although Devonshire had remained formally prime minister, but now Pitt and Newcastle were ready to offer stronger direction to the country's strategy.

By summer 1757 the British war effort over the previous three years had broadly been a failure. Britain's attempts to take the offensive in North America had ended in disaster, Menorca had been lost, and the Duke of Cumberland's Army of Observation was retreating across Hanover following the Battle of Hastenback. In October Cumberland was forced to conclude the Convention of Klosterzeven, which would take Hanover out of the war. The French Invasion of Hanover posed a threat to Britain's ally Prussia, which was now vulnerable to attack from the west by the French as well as facing attack from Austria, Russia, Saxony and Sweden.

Although it was late in the campaigning season when he had come to power, Pitt set about trying to initiate a more assertive strategy. He conspired with a number of figures to persuade the Hanoverians to revoke the Klosterzevern Convention and re-enter the war on Britain's side, which they did in late 1757. He also put into practice a scheme of Naval Descents that would make amphibious landings on the French coast. The first of these, the Raid on Rochefort, took place in September but was not a success. The centrepiece of the campaign in North America, an expedition to capture Louisbourg, was aborted due to the presence of a large French fleet and a gale that scattered the British fleet.

=== 1758 ===
In 1758, Pitt began to put into practice a new strategy to win the Seven Years' War, which would involve tying down large numbers of French troops and resources in Germany, while Britain used its naval supremacy to launch expeditions to capture French forces around the globe. Following the capture of Emden he ordered the dispatch of the first British troops to the European continent under the Duke of Marlborough, who joined Brunswick's army. This was a dramatic reversal of his previous position, as he had recently been strongly opposed to any such commitment.

Pitt had been lobbied by an American merchant Thomas Cumming to launch an expedition against the French trading settlements in West Africa. In April 1758 British forces captured the ill-defended fort of Saint-Louis in Senegal. The mission was so lucrative that Pitt sent out further expeditions to capture Gorée and Gambia later in the year. He also drew up plans to attack French islands in the Caribbean the following year at the suggestion of a Jamaican sugar planter William Beckford.

In North America, a second British attempt to capture Louisbourg succeeded. However, Pitt's pleasure over this was tempered by the subsequent news of a significant British defeat at the Battle of Carillon. Toward the end of the year the Forbes Expedition seized the site of Fort Duquesne and began constructing the British-controlled Fort Pitt (which later grew into the city of Pittsburgh). This gave the British control of the Ohio Country, which had been the principal cause of the war.

In Europe, Brunswick's forces enjoyed a mixed year. Brunswick had crossed the Rhine, but faced with being cut off he had retreated and blocked any potential French move toward Hanover with his victory at the Battle of Krefeld. The year ended with something approaching a stalemate in Germany. Pitt had continued his naval descents during 1758, but the first had enjoyed only limited success and the second ended with near disaster at the Battle of St Cast and no further descents were planned. Instead the troops and ships would be used as part of the coming expedition to the French West Indies. The scheme of amphibious raids was the only one of Pitt's policies during the war that was broadly a failure, although it did help briefly relieve pressure on the German front by tying down French troops on coastal protection service.

==== Annus Mirabilis ====
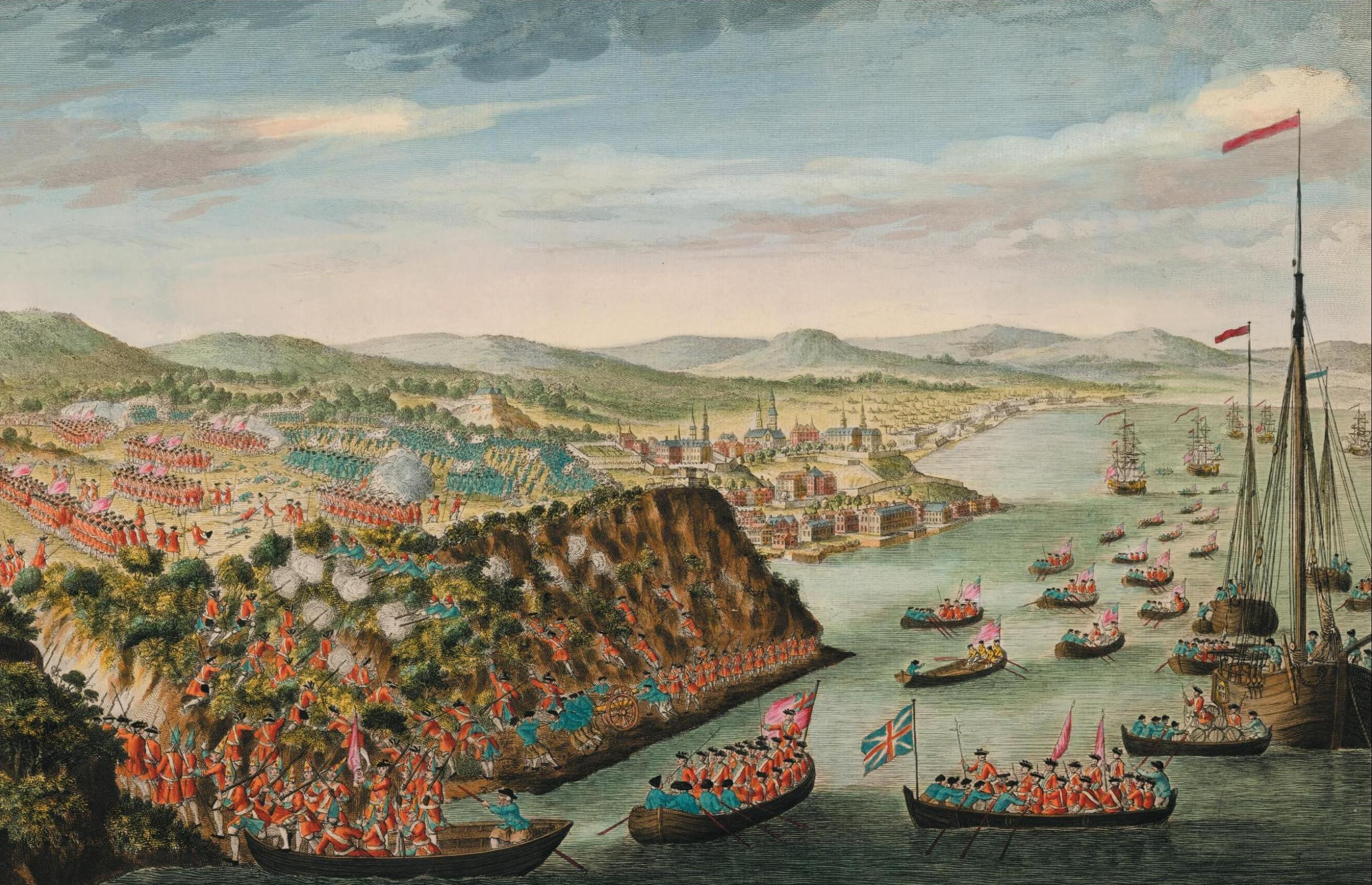
James Wolfe's victory at the Battle of Quebec in 1759

In France a new leader, the Duc de Choiseul, had recently come to power and 1759 offered a duel between their rival strategies. Pitt intended to continue with his plan of tying down French forces in Germany while continuing the assault on France's colonies. Choiseul hoped to repel the attacks in the colonies while seeking total victory in Europe.

Pitt's war around the world was largely successful. While a British invasion of Martinique failed, they captured Guadeloupe shortly afterward. In India, a French attempt to capture Madras was repulsed. In North America, British troops closed in on France's Canadian heartland. A British force under James Wolfe moved up the Saint Lawrence with the aim of capturing Quebec. After initially failing to penetrate the French defences at the Montmorency Falls, Wolfe later led his men to a victory to the west of the city allowing the British forces to capture Quebec.

Choiseul had pinned much of his hopes on a French invasion of Britain, which he hoped would knock Britain out of the war and make it surrender the colonies it had taken from France. Pitt had stripped the home islands of troops to send on his expeditions, leaving Britain guarded by poorly trained militia and giving an opportunity for the French if they could land in enough force. The French did build a large invasion force. However the French naval defeats at Lagos and Quiberon Bay forced Choiseul to abandon the invasion plans. France's other great hope, that their armies could make a breakthrough in Germany and invade Hanover, was thwarted at the Battle of Minden. Britain ended the year victorious in every theatre of operations in which it was engaged, with Pitt receiving the credit for this.

==== 1760–1761 ====
Britain completed the conquest of Canada in 1760 by capturing Montreal, which effectively brought the war to an end on mainland North America.

Pitt's power had now reached its peak, but was soon under threat. The domestic political situation was altered dramatically when George II died in October 1760. He was succeeded by his grandson, George III, who had once considered Pitt an ally but had become angered by Pitt's alliance with Newcastle and acceptance of the need for British intervention in Germany – which George was strongly opposed to. The new king successfully lobbied for his favourite Lord Bute to be given the post of Northern Secretary. Bute was inclined to support a withdrawal from Germany, and to fight the war with France largely at sea and in the colonies.

Pitt's plan for an expedition to capture Belle Île was put into force in April 1761 and it was captured after a siege. This provided yet a further blow to French prestige, as it was the first part of Metropolitan France to be occupied. Pitt now expected France to offer terms, although he was prepared for a longer war if necessary. Envoys were exchanged, but neither side could reach an agreement. Pitt's refusal to grant the French a share in Newfoundland proved the biggest obstacle to peace, as Pitt declared he would rather lose the use of his right arm than give the French a share there and later said he would rather give up the Tower of London than Newfoundland. Newfoundland was at the time seen as possessing huge economic and strategic value because of the extensive fishing industry there.

The war in Germany continued through 1761 with the French again attempting to overcome Brunswick and invade Hanover, but suffering a defeat at the Battle of Villinghausen. Pitt had substantially increased the number of British troops serving with Brunswick, and he also planned further conquests in the West Indies. A strategy he hoped would compel the French to conclude a reasonable peace treaty.

==== Treaty of Paris ====
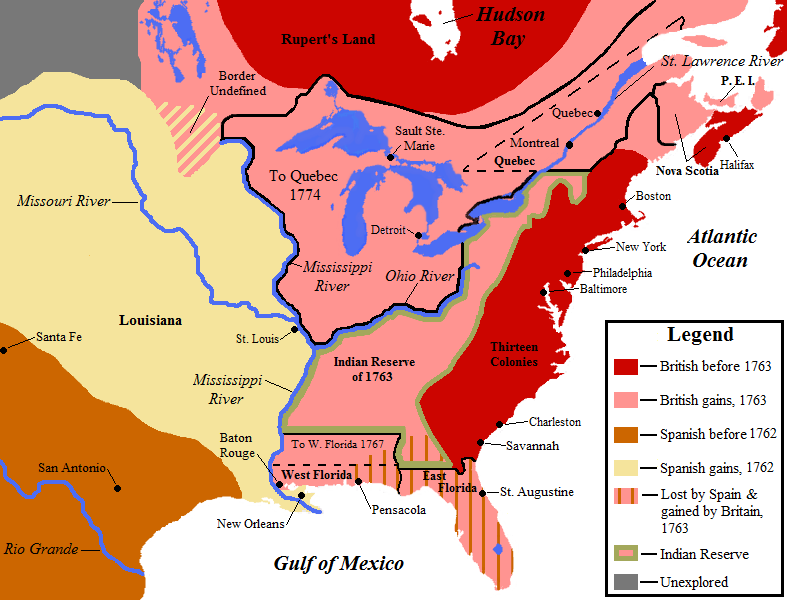
New borders drawn by the Royal Proclamation of 1763

To the preliminaries of the peace concluded in February 1763 he offered an indignant resistance, considering the terms quite inadequate to the successes that had been gained by the country. When the treaty was discussed in parliament in December of the previous year, although suffering from a severe attack of gout, he was carried down to the House, and in a speech of three hours' duration, interrupted more than once by paroxysms of pain, he strongly protested against its various conditions. These conditions included the return of the sugar islands (but Britain retained Dominica); trading stations in West Africa (won by Boscawen); Pondicherry (France's Indian colony); and fishing rights in Newfoundland. Pitt's opposition arose through two heads: France had been given the means to become once more formidable at sea, whilst Frederick of Prussia had been betrayed.

Pitt believed that the task had been left half-finished and called for a final year of war which would crush French power for good. Pitt had long-held plans for further conquests which had been uncompleted. Newcastle, by contrast, sought peace but only if the war in Germany could be brought to an honourable and satisfactory conclusion (rather than Britain suddenly bailing out of it as Bute proposed). However the combined opposition of Newcastle and Pitt was not enough to prevent the Treaty passing comfortably in both Houses of Parliament.

However, there were strong reasons for concluding the peace: the national debt had increased from £74.5 million in 1755 to £133.25 million in 1763, the year of the peace. The requirement to pay down this debt, and the lack of French threat in Canada, were major movers in the subsequent American War of Independence.

The physical cause which rendered this effort so painful probably accounts for the infrequency of his appearances in parliament, as well as for much that is otherwise inexplicable in his subsequent conduct. In 1763, he spoke against the unpopular tax on cider, imposed by his brother-in-law, George Grenville, and his opposition, although unsuccessful in the House, helped to keep alive his popularity with the country, which cordially hated the excise and all connected with it. When next year the question of general warrants was raised in connection with the case of John Wilkes, Pitt vigorously maintained their illegality, thus defending at once the privileges of Parliament and the freedom of the press.

During 1765 he seems to have been totally incapacitated for public business. In the following year he supported with great power the proposal of the Rockingham administration for the repeal of the Stamp Act, arguing that it was unconstitutional to impose taxes upon the colonies. He thus endorsed the contention of the colonists on the ground of principle, while the majority of those who acted with him contented themselves with resisting the disastrous taxation scheme on the ground of expediency.

The Repeal (1766) of the Stamp Act, indeed, was only passed pari passu with another censuring the American assemblies, and declaring the authority of the British parliament over the colonies "in all cases whatsoever".

Thus the House of Commons repudiated in the most formal manner the principle Pitt laid down. His language in approval of the resistance of the colonists was unusually bold, and perhaps no one but himself could have employed it with impunity at a time when the freedom of debate was only imperfectly conceded.

Pitt had not been long out of office when he was solicited to return to it, and the solicitations were more than once renewed. Unsuccessful overtures were made to him in 1763, and twice in 1765, in May and June—the negotiator in May being the king's uncle, the Duke of Cumberland, who went down in person to Hayes, Pitt's seat in Kent. It is known that he had the opportunity of joining the Marquess of Rockingham's short-lived administration at any time on his own terms, and his conduct in declining an arrangement with that minister has been more generally condemned than any other step in his public life.

=== Leadership ===
The London Magazine of 1767 offered "Pitt, Pompadour, Prussia, Providence" as the reasons for Britain's success in the Seven Years' War. Pitt's relation to all three was such as to entitle him to a large share in the credit of their deeds. He inspired trust in his chosen commanders by his indifference to rules of seniority—several of "Pitt's boys", like Keppel, captor of Gorée, were in their thirties—and by his clear orders. It was his discernment that selected Wolfe to lead the attack on Quebec, and gave him the opportunity of dying a victor on the heights of Abraham. He had personally less to do with the successes in India than with the other great enterprises that shed an undying lustre on his administration; but his generous praise in parliament encouraged Robert Clive, and the forces that acted at the close of the struggle were animated by his indomitable spirit.

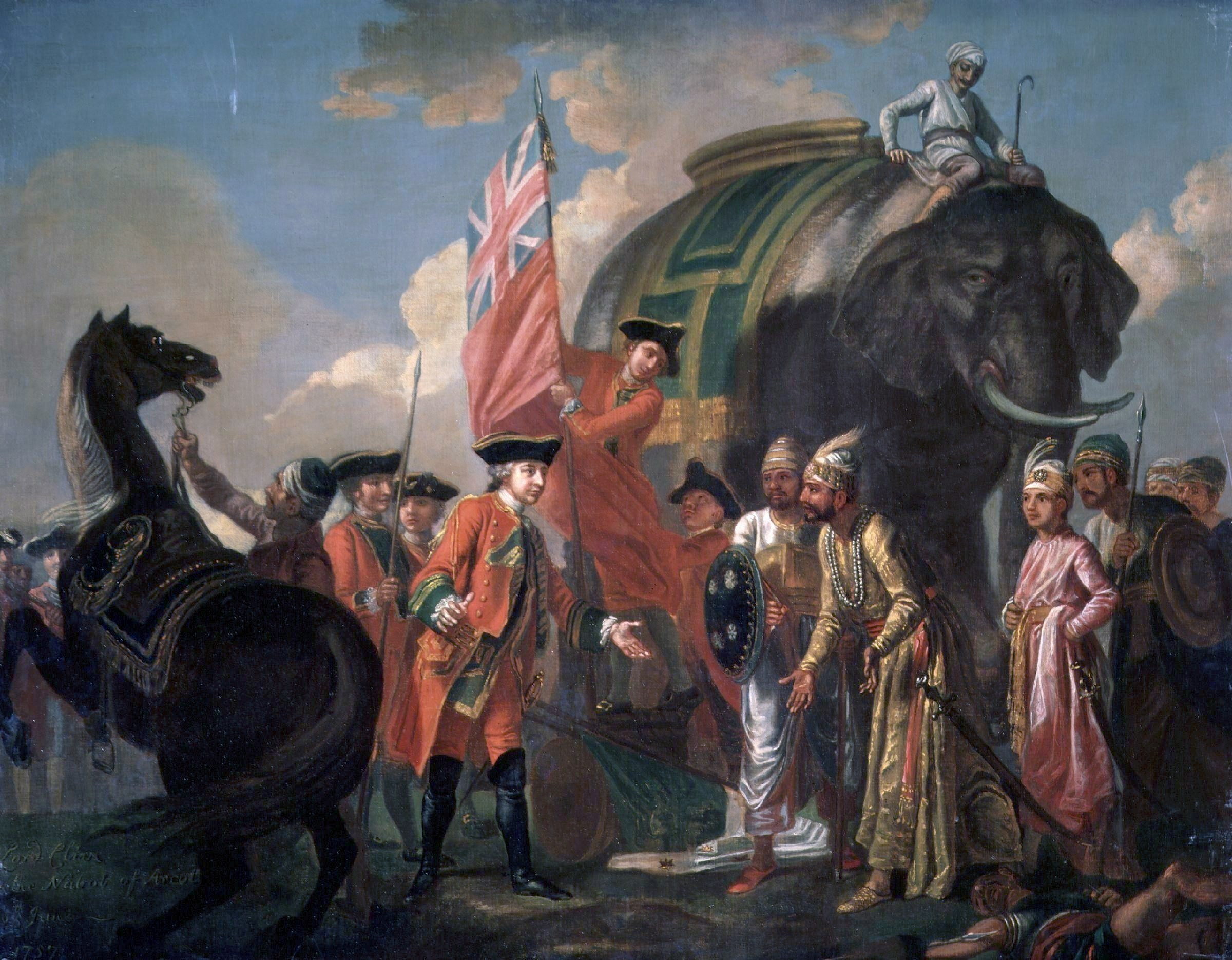
Robert Clive's victory at the Battle of Plassey established the East India Company as a military as well as a commercial power.

Pitt's particular genius was to finance an army on the continent to drain French men and resources so that Britain might concentrate on what he held to be the vital spheres: Canada and the West Indies; whilst Clive successfully defeated Siraj ud-Daulah, (the last independent Nawab of Bengal) at Plassey (1757), securing India. The Continental campaign was carried on by Cumberland, defeated at Hastenbeck and forced to surrender at Convention of Klosterzeven (1757) and thereafter by Ferdinand of Brunswick, later victor at Minden; Britain's Continental campaign had two major strands, firstly subsidising allies, particularly Frederick the Great, and second, financing an army to divert French resources from the colonial war and to also defend Hanover (which was the territory of the Kings of England at this time)

Pitt was a leading imperialist in English history. He was the directing mind in the expansion of his country, and with him the beginning of empire is rightly associated. The Seven Years' War might well, moreover, have been another Thirty Years' War if Pitt had not furnished Frederick with an annual subsidy of £700,000, and in addition relieved him of the task of defending western Germany against France: this was the policy that allowed Pitt to boast of having "won Canada on the banks of the Rhine".

Contemporary opinion was, of course, incompetent to estimate the permanent results gained for the country by the brilliant foreign policy of Pitt. It has long been generally agreed that by several of his most costly expeditions nothing was really won but glory: the policy of diversionary attacks on places like Rochefort was memorably described as 'breaking windows with gold guineas'. It has even been said that the only permanent acquisition that England owed directly to him was her Canadian dominion; and, strictly speaking, this is true, it being admitted that the campaign by which the Indian empire was virtually won was not planned by him, although brought to a successful issue during his ministry.

But material aggrandisement, although the only tangible, was not the only real or lasting effect of a war policy. More could be gained by crushing a formidable rival than by conquering a province. The loss of her Canadian possessions was only one of a series of disasters suffered by France, which included the victories at sea of Boscawen at Lagos and Hawke at Quiberon Bay. Such defeats radically affected the future of Europe and the world. Deprived of her most valuable colonies both in the East and in the West, and thoroughly defeated on the continent, France's humiliation was the beginning of a new epoch in history.

The war that Pitt guided and the eventual loss of the French is thought to have weakened France's military prestige, and has thus been thought to be one of the multitude of influences that slowly brought about the French Revolution. It effectually deprived France of the lead in the councils of Europe which she had hitherto arrogated to herself, and so affected the whole course of continental politics. It is such far-reaching results as these, and not the mere acquisition of a single colony, however valuable, that constitute Pitt's claim to be considered as the most powerful minister that ever guided the foreign policy of England.

==== Resignation ====
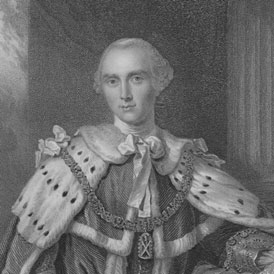
Lord Bute's rise to power between 1760 and 1762 dramatically influenced the emphasis of Britain's war effort. Like the new king, Bute favoured an end to British involvement on the continent.

George II died on 25 October 1760, and was succeeded by his grandson, George III. The new king was inclined to view politics in personal terms and was taught to believe that "Pitt had the blackest of hearts". The new king had counsellors of his own, led by Lord Bute. Bute soon joined the cabinet as a Northern Secretary and Pitt and he were quickly in dispute over a number of issues.

In 1761, Pitt had received information from his agents about a secret Bourbon Family Compact by which the Bourbons of France and Spain bound themselves in an offensive alliance against Britain. Spain was concerned that Britain's victories over France had left them too powerful, and were a threat in the long term to Spain's own empire. Equally they may have believed that the British had become overstretched by fighting a global war and decided to try to seize British possessions such as Jamaica. A secret convention pledged that if Britain and France were still at war by 1 May 1762, Spain would enter the war on the French side.

Pitt urged that such a clear threat should be met by a pre-emptive strike against Spain's navy and her colonies—with emphasis on speed to prevent Spain bringing the annual Manila galleon safely to harbour. Bute and Newcastle refused to support such a move, as did the entire cabinet except Temple, believing it would make Britain look the aggressor against Spain, potentially provoking other neutral nations to declare war on Britain. Pitt believed he had no choice but to leave a cabinet in which his advice on a vital question had been rejected and presented his resignation. Many of his cabinet colleagues secretly welcomed his departure as they believed his dominance and popularity were a threat to the Constitution. Pitt's brother-in-law George Grenville was given a major role in government, angering Pitt who felt Grenville should have resigned with him. Pitt regarded Grenville's action as a betrayal and there was hostility between them for several years.

After Pitt's resignation in October 1761, the King urged Pitt to accept a mark of royal favour. Accordingly, he obtained a pension of £3000 a year and his wife, Lady Hester Grenville was created Baroness Chatham in her own right—although Pitt refused to accept a title himself. Pitt assured the King that he would not go into direct opposition against the government. His conduct after his retirement was distinguished by a moderation and disinterestedness which, as Edmund Burke remarked, "set a seal upon his character". The war with Spain, in which he had urged the cabinet to take the initiative, proved inevitable; but he scorned to use the occasion for "altercation and recrimination", and spoke in support of the government measures for carrying on the war.

Twenty years after he had received a similar windfall from the Marlborough legacy, Sir William Pynsent, Bt., a Somerset baronet to whom he was personally quite unknown, left him his entire estate, worth about three thousand a year, in testimony of approval of his political career.

== Prime Minister (1766–1768) ==
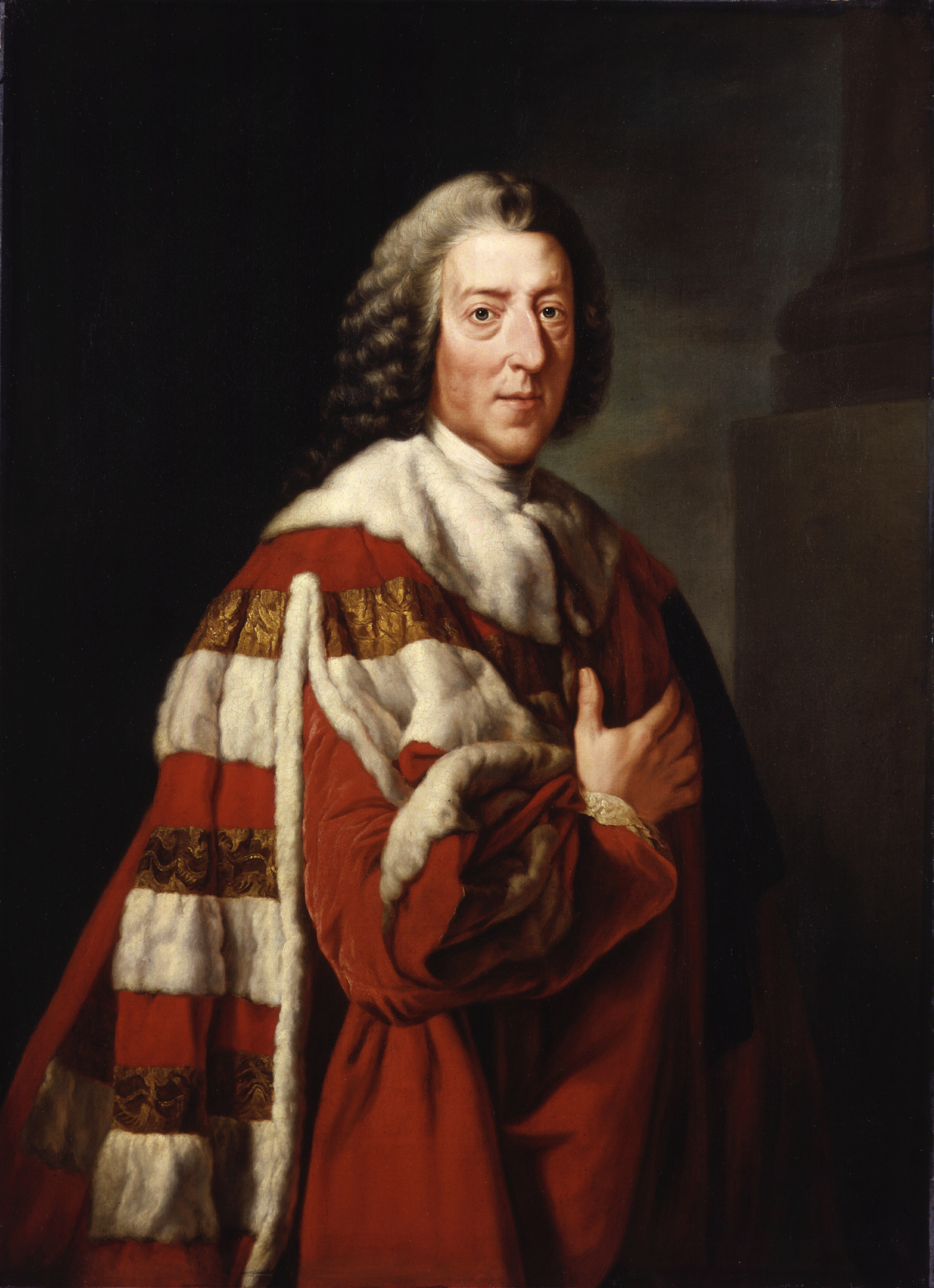
Pitt the Elder, by Richard Brompton

=== Chatham ministry ===
In July 1766 Rockingham was dismissed, and Pitt was entrusted by the King with the task of forming a government entirely of his own selection. His principle, "measures not men", appealed to the King whom he proposed to serve by "destroying all party distinctions". Pitt made appointments based not on connections but on merit, such as Charles Townshend to the Exchequer and Shelburne as Secretary of State, to order American affairs. Pitt chose for himself the office of Lord Privy Seal, which required his elevation to the House of Lords, and on 4 August he became Earl of Chatham, in the County of Kent, and Viscount Pitt, of Burton Pynsent in the County of Somerset.

Pitt's decision to accept a peerage was likely influenced by his declining health and desire for a less demanding role, but the "great commoner" lost a great deal of public support. For example, in view of his probable accession to power, preparations were made in the City of London for a banquet and a general illumination to celebrate the event, but the celebration was at once countermanded when it was known that he had become Earl of Chatham.

Edmund Burke described the administration as "chequered and speckled", and spoke of it as "patriots and courtiers, King's friends and republicans; Whigs and Tories ... indeed a very curious show, but utterly unsafe to touch and unsure to stand on".

=== Economic policy ===
The problems facing the government included the observance of the Treaty of Paris by France and Spain, tension between American colonists and the mother country, and the status of the East India Company. One of the new ministry's earliest acts was to lay an embargo upon corn, which was thought necessary in order to prevent a dearth resulting from the unprecedented bad harvest of 1766. The measure was strongly opposed, and Lord Chatham delivered his first speech in the House of Lords in support of it. It proved to be almost the only measure introduced by his government in which he personally interested himself.

=== Colonial policy ===
In 1767, Charles Townshend, the Chancellor of the Exchequer, enacted the Townshend Acts. They imposed duties in the American colonies on tea, paper, and other goods. The taxes were created without the consultation of Chatham and possibly against his wishes. They proved offensive to the American colonists. Townshend himself died in 1767, before their detrimental effects became apparent.

Chatham's attention had been directed to the growing importance of the affairs of India, and there is evidence in his correspondence that he was meditating a comprehensive scheme for transferring much of the power of the East India Company to the crown. Yet he was incapacitated physically and mentally during nearly his entire tenure of office. Chatham rarely saw any of his colleagues although they repeatedly and urgently pressed for interviews with him, and even an offer from the King to visit him in person was respectfully declined. While his gout seemed to improve, he was newly afflicted with mental alienation bordering on insanity. Chatham's lack of leadership resulted in an incohesive set of policies.

=== Resignation ===
Chatham dismissed his allies Amherst and Shelburne from their posts, and then in October 1768 he tendered his own resignation on the grounds of poor health, leaving the leadership to Grafton, his First Lord of the Treasury.

== Later life ==
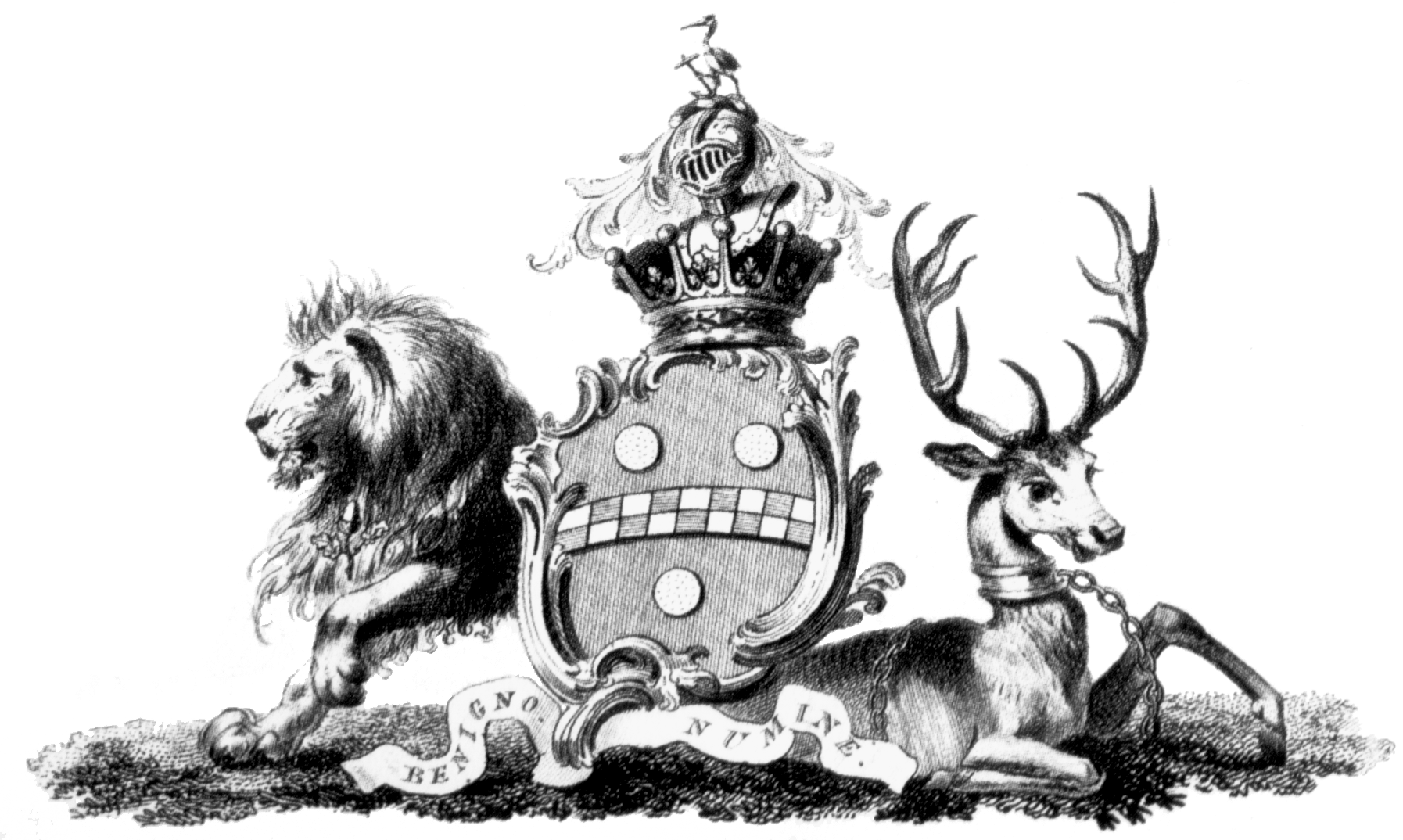
Coat of arms of William Pitt

Soon after his resignation a renewed attack of gout freed Chatham from the mental disease under which he had so long suffered. He had been nearly two years and a half in seclusion when, in July 1769, he again appeared in public at a royal levee. It was not, however, until 1770 that he resumed his seat in the House of Lords.

=== Falklands Crisis ===
The same year when Britain and Spain became involved in the Falklands Crisis and came close to war, Pitt was a staunch advocate of taking a tough stance with Madrid and Paris (as he had been during the earlier Corsican Crisis when France had invaded Corsica) and made a number of speeches on the subject rousing public opinion. The government of Lord North was pushed into taking a firmer line because of this, mobilising the navy, and forcing Spain to back down. Some had even believed that the issue was enough to cast North from office and restore Pitt as Prime Minister—although the ultimate result was to strengthen the position of North who took credit for his firm handling of the crisis and was able to fill the cabinet with his own supporters. North would go on to dominate politics for the next decade, leading the country until 1782.

=== American Revolutionary War ===
Chatham sought to discourage industrialization in the American colonies, stating in 1770 that "the colonies should not be permitted to manufacture so much as a horseshoe nail".

Chatham sought to find a compromise on the escalating conflict with the American colonies. As he realised the gravity of the American situation, Chatham re-entered the fray, declaring that he would "be in earnest for the public" and "a scarecrow of violence to the gentler warblers of the grove". His position changed from an obsession in 1774 with the question of the authority of Parliament to a search for a formula for conciliation in 1775. He proposed the "Provisional Act" that would both maintain the ultimate authority of Parliamentary sovereignty, while meeting the colonial demands. The Lords defeated his proposal on 1 February 1775. Chatham's warnings regarding America were ignored. After war had broken out, he warned that America could not be conquered. Due to his stance, Pitt was very popular amongst the American colonists. This high esteem approached idolatry according to historian Clinton Rossiter:

In the last decade of the colonial period the ideal of the man of public virtue was made real in the person of William Pitt. The cult of this noblest of Whigs, "the Genius of England and the Comet of his Age" was well advanced toward idolatry at least five years before the Stamp Act. The greatest of "the great men of England", the last and noblest of the Romans, was considered the embodiment of virtue, wisdom, patriotism, liberty, and temperance ... Pitt, "glorious and immortal", the "guardian of America", was the idol of the colonies ... A Son of Liberty in Bristol County, Massachusetts, paid him the ultimate tribute of identification with English liberty: "Our toast in general is,—Magna Charta, the British Constitution,—PITT and Liberty forever!"

=== Death ===
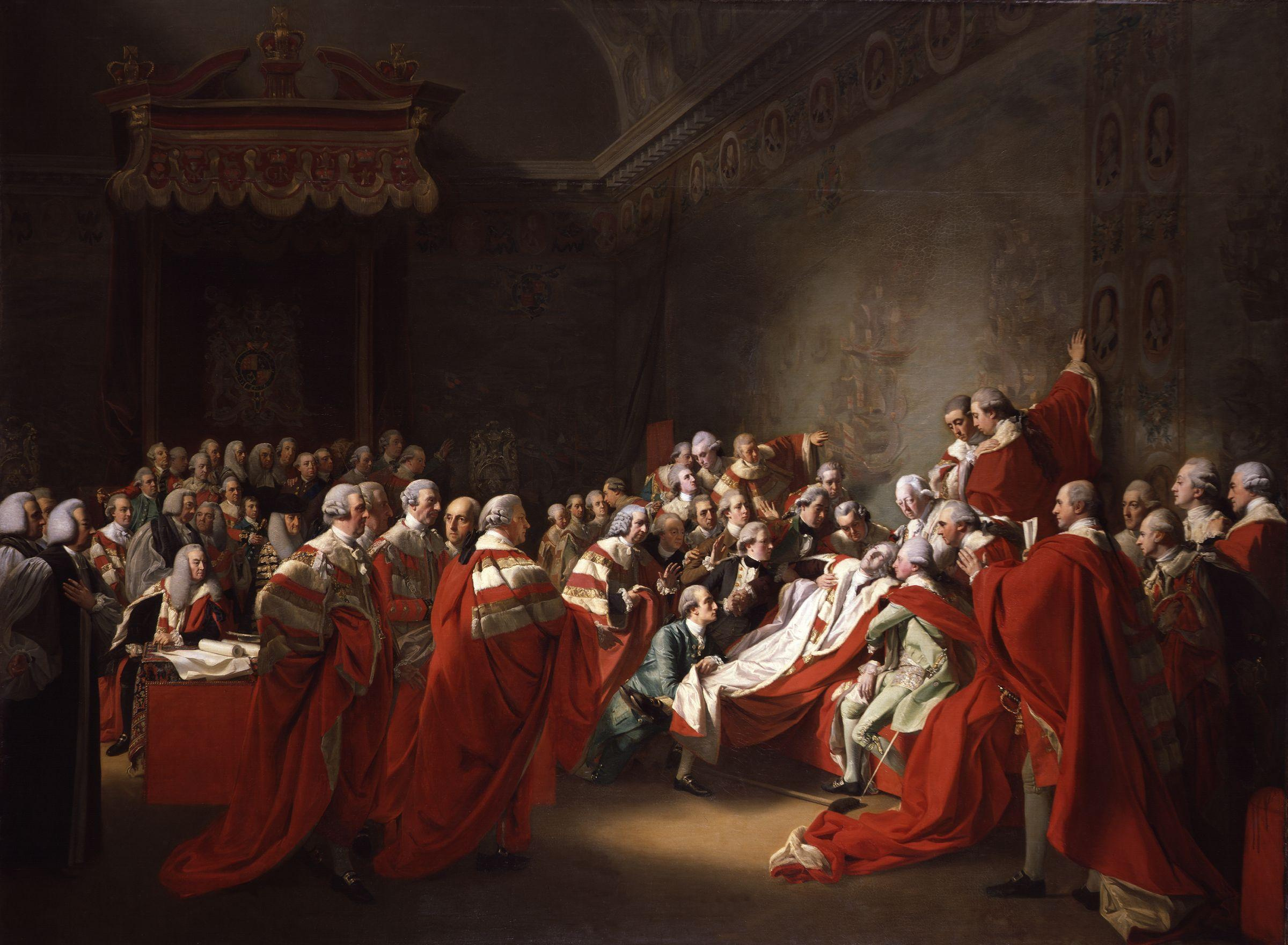
The Death of the Earl of Chatham in the House of Lords, 7 April 1778. Painting by John Singleton Copley, 1779–80. (In fact he died 34 days after the seizure depicted.)

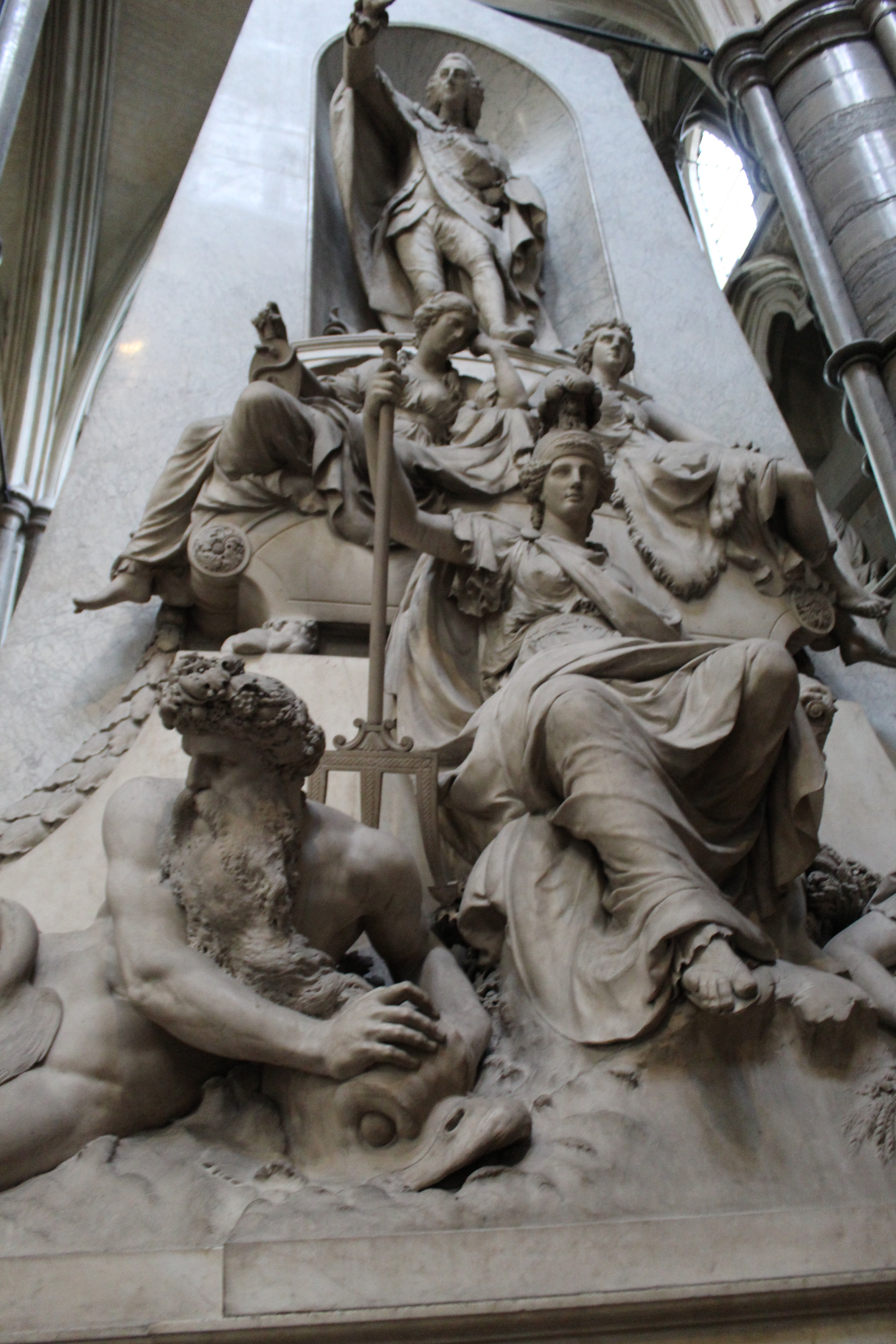
Monument to Pitt, Westminster Abbey

Pitt had now almost no personal following, mainly owing to the grave mistake he had made in not forming an alliance with the Rockingham party, but his eloquence was as powerful as ever, and all its power was directed against the government policy in the contest with America, which had become the question of all-absorbing interest. His last appearance in the House of Lords was on 7 April 1778, on the occasion of the Duke of Richmond's motion for an address praying the king to conclude peace with America on any terms.

In view of the hostile demonstrations of France the various parties had come generally to see the necessity of such a measure but Chatham could not brook the thought of a step which implied submission to the "natural enemy" whom it had been the main object of his life to humble, and he declaimed for a considerable time, although with diminished vigour, against the motion. After the Duke of Richmond had replied, he rose again excitedly as if to speak, pressed his hand upon his breast, and fell down in a fit. His last words before he collapsed were: "My Lords, any state is better than despair; if we must fall, let us fall like men." James Harris MP, however, recorded that Lord Nugent had told him that Chatham's last words in the Lords were: "If the Americans defend independence, they shall find me in their way" and that his very last words (spoken to his soldier son John) were: "Leave your dying father, and go to the defence of your country".

He was moved to his home at Hayes, where his middle son William read to him Homer's passage about the death of Hector. Chatham died on 11 May 1778, aged 69. Although he was initially buried at Hayes, all parties combined to show their sense of the national loss and the Commons presented an address to the king praying that the deceased statesman might be buried with the honours of a public funeral. A sum was voted for a public monument which was erected over a new grave in Westminster Abbey. The monument, by the sculptor John Bacon, has a figure of Pitt above statues of Britannia and Neptune with figures representing Prudence, Fortitude, the Earth and also a sea creature.

In the Guildhall Edmund Burke's inscription summed up what he had meant to the city: he was "the minister by whom commerce was united with and made to flourish by war". Soon after the funeral a bill was passed bestowing a pension of £4,000 a year on his successors in the earldom. He had a family of three sons and two daughters, of whom the second son, William, became prime minister in 1783.

== Legacy ==
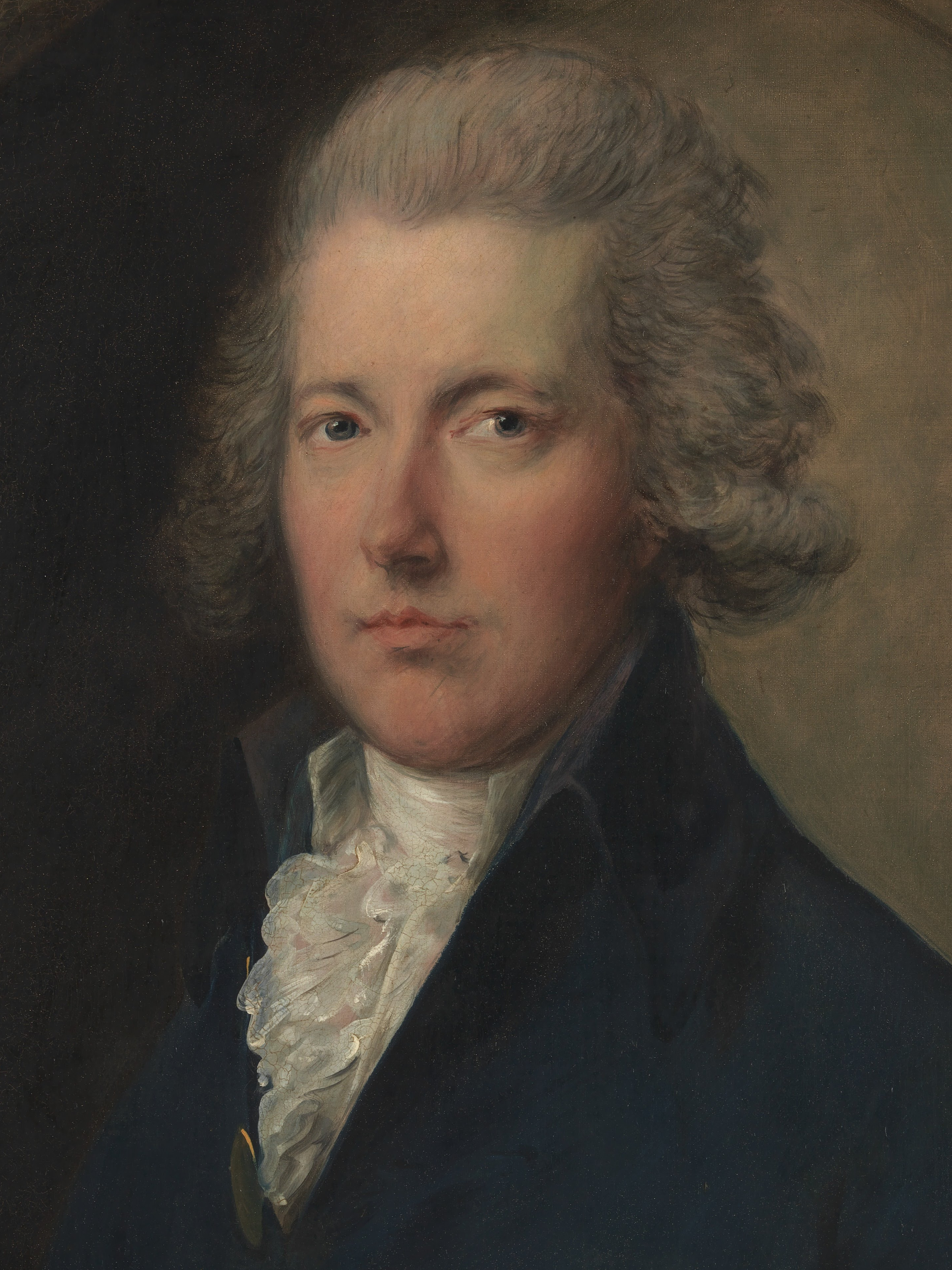
William Pitt the Younger was to become Prime Minister at a young age and lead Britain for more than twenty years.

Horace Walpole, not an uncritical admirer, wrote of Pitt:

It were ingratitude to him to say that he did not give such a reverberation to our stagnating councils, as exceedingly altered the appearance of our fortune. He warded off the evil hour that seemed approaching, he infused vigour into our arms, he taught the nation to speak again as England used to speak to foreign powers ... Pitt, on entering upon administration, had found the nation at the lowest ebb in point of power and reputation ... France, who meant to be feared, was feared heartily ... They were willing to trust that France would be so good as to ruin us by inches. Pitt had roused us from this ignoble lethargy ... The admirers of Mr Pitt extol the reverberation he gave to our councils, the despondence he banished, the spirit he infused, the conquests he made, the security he affixed to our trade and plantations, the humiliation of France, the glory of Britain carried under his administration to a pitch at which it never had arrived—and all this is exactly true.

Samuel Johnson is reported to have said that "Walpole was a minister given by the king to the people, but Pitt was a minister given by the people to the king", and the remark correctly indicated Chatham's distinctive place among English statesmen. He was the first minister whose main strength lay in the support of the nation at large as distinct from its representatives in the Commons, where his personal following was always small. He was the first to discern that public opinion, though generally slow to form and slow to act, is in the end the paramount power in the state; and he was the first to use it not in an emergency merely, but throughout a whole political career.

Chatham marked the commencement of that vast change in the movement of English politics by which it came about that the sentiment of the great mass of the people then told effectively on the action of the government from day to day—almost from hour to hour. He was well fitted to secure the sympathy and admiration of his countrymen, for his virtues and his failings were alike English. He was often inconsistent, he was generally intractable and overbearing, and he was always pompous and affected to a degree which, as Macaulay remarked, seemed scarcely compatible with true greatness.

Of the last quality evidence was furnished in the stilted style of his letters, and in the fact recorded by Thomas Seward that he never permitted his under-secretaries to sit in his presence. Burke spoke of "some significant, pompous, creeping, explanatory, ambiguous matter, in the true Chathamic style". But these defects were known only to the inner circle of his associates.

To the outside public he was endeared as a statesman who could do or suffer "nothing base", and who had the rare power of transfusing his own indomitable energy and courage into all who served under him. "A spirited foreign policy" has always been popular in England, and Pitt was the most popular of English ministers, because he was the most successful exponent of such a policy. In domestic affairs his influence was small and almost entirely indirect. He himself confessed his unfitness for dealing with questions of finance. The commercial prosperity that was produced by his war policy was in a great part delusive, as prosperity so produced must always be, although it had permanent effects of the highest moment in the rise of such centres of industry as Glasgow. This, however, was a remote result which he could have neither intended nor foreseen.

It has been suggested that Pitt was in fact a far more orthodox Whig than has been historically portrayed demonstrated by his sitting for rotten borough seats controlled by aristocratic magnates, and his lifelong concern for protecting the balance of power on the European continent, which marked him out from many other Patriots.

Historians such as Caleb Carr have described Pitt as "the greatest British statesman of the eighteenth century". He is immortalised in St Stephen's Hall, where he and other notable Parliamentarians look on at visitors to Parliament.

The American city of Pittsburgh, originally Fort Duquesne, was renamed for Pitt after it was captured from the French during the Seven Years' War.

== Family and personal life ==
Pitt married Lady Hester Grenville (1720–1803), daughter of the 1st Countess Temple, on 16 November 1754 by Francis Ayscough under special licence at her home in Argyle Street, London.

They had five children, born at Hayes:

- Lady Hester Pitt (19 October 1755 – 20 July 1780), who married Viscount Mahon, later the 3rd Earl Stanhope, on 19 December 1774; three children, including the traveler and Arabist Lady Hester Stanhope
- John Pitt, 2nd Earl of Chatham (1756–1835), who married The Hon. Mary Townshend; no issue
- Lady Harriet Pitt (18 April 1758 – 1786), who married The Hon. Edward James Eliot, oldest son of the 1st Baron Eliot, in 1785; one child
- Hon. William Pitt the Younger (28 May 1759 – 23 January 1806), who also served as prime minister; never married
- Hon. James Charles Pitt (24 April 1761 – 13 November 1780), Royal Navy officer who died in Antigua; never married

== Arms ==
Coat of arms of William Pitt, 1st Earl of Chatham
Crest A stork proper beaked and membered or, resting the dexter claw on an anchor erect cabled or. Escutcheon Sable, a fess chequy argent and azure between three bezants. Supporters Dexter, A lion rampant guardant proper charged on the shoulder with an acorn or, slipped and leaved vert. Sinister, A buck proper attired, collared and chained or. Motto Benigno numine (By Divine Providence)

Pitt's arms form the basis for those of Pittsburgh, Pennsylvania and the University of Pittsburgh.

== Cultural references ==
There have been at least two Royal Navy ships that bore the name HMS Pitt.

=== Places named after William Pitt ===
United States

- Chatham, Massachusetts
- Chatham, New Hampshire
- Chatham, New Jersey during 1773 change to village form of government
- Chatham, Virginia
- Chatham County, Georgia
- Chatham County, North Carolina
- Chatham Square, New York City
- Chatham Square, Savannah, Georgia
- Chatham Strait, Alaska
- Chatham Township, Tioga County, Pennsylvania
- Chatham University, in Pittsburgh, Pennsylvania
- Hampstead, New Hampshire. Colonial governor Benning Wentworth renamed the town after Pitt's residence, Hampstead, England.
- Pitt County, North Carolina
- Pittsboro, North Carolina
- Pittsburg, New Hampshire
- Pittsburgh, Pennsylvania (renamed, previously called Fort Duquesne). After British General John Forbes occupied Fort Duquesne during the French and Indian War, he ordered the site's reconstruction and named it after then-Secretary of State Pitt. He also named the settlement between the rivers "Pittsborough", which would eventually become known as Pittsburgh.
- Pittsfield, Massachusetts
- Pittsfield, New Hampshire
- Pittsfield Charter Township, Michigan
- Pittsgrove Township, New Jersey
- Pittstown, New Jersey
- Pittston, Pennsylvania
- Pittston Township, Pennsylvania
- Pittsylvania, Vandalia - a short-lived, sparsely-colonised, extralegal colony of Vandalia (located in modern West Virginia and named after Charlotte of Mecklenburg-Strelitz) was originally named after Pitt.
- Pittsylvania County, Virginia, and its county seat, Chatham

Canada

- CFB Chatham, near Chatham, New Brunswick
- Chatham, New Brunswick
- Chatham, Ontario
- Chatham Township, Quebec.

Australia

- Chatham, New South Wales
- Pitt Town, New South Wales, named after Pitt by Governor Macquarie in 1810

Ecuador

- Chatham Island, Galápagos

New Zealand

- Chatham Islands an archipelago including Pitt Island and Chatham Island

=== References in popular culture ===
- Pitt is referred to in the 1992 Simpsons episode "Homer at the Bat", where Barney and guest star Wade Boggs get into a bar fight after a heated debate over the subject of who was England's greatest prime minister. Boggs claims Pitt the Elder was the greatest prime minister to Barney's Lord Palmerston, causing Barney to punch Boggs in the face, knocking him unconscious.
- Pitt is briefly derided (but does not appear) in the Blackadder The Third episode "Dish and Dishonesty". Blackadder states that he is "about as effective as a catflap in an elephant house".
- In The Two Georges, an alternate history by Harry Turtledove, William Pitt was the prime minister during a period of political tension between Great Britain and its North American colonies. He played a significant role in easing those tensions and ensuring the colonists remained content British subjects. He was also one of the historical figures in Thomas Gainsborough's fictional painting The Two Georges, depicting George Washington being presented to King George III.
- In 1770, Laurence Sterne dedicated his masterpiece, The Life and Opinions of Tristram Shandy, Gentleman to the rt. hon. Mr Pitt.
- In 1790, Scotland's Bard, the poet Robert Burns, referred to Pitt in his Scots language poem, "Lines To A Gentleman", which Burns composed in response to being sent a newspaper, which the gentlemen sender offered to continue providing free of charge. The poet's satirical summary of events makes clear that he has no interest in the reports contained in the newspaper. The poem's section on events in Parliament, which refers to Pitt as 'Chatham Will', is as follows:

How royal George, the Lord leuk o'er him!
Was managing St. Stephen's quorum;
If sleekit Chatham Will was livin,
Or glaikit Charlie got his nieve in;
How daddie Burke the plea was cookin,
If Warren Hasting's neck was yeukin;
How cesses, stents, and fees were rax'd.
Or if bare arses yet were tax'd...

== See also ==
- Grenvillite

== Sources ==
- Cokayne, George; et al., The Complete Peerage, vol. III

Political offices
Preceded by Thomas Winnington	Paymaster of the Forces; 1746–1755	Succeeded by The Earl of Darlington; Viscount Dupplin
Preceded by Henry Fox	Secretary of State for the Southern Department; 1756–1757	Succeeded by The Earl of Holdernesse
Preceded by Henry Fox	Leader of the House of Commons; 1756–1761	Succeeded by George Grenville
Preceded by The Earl of Holdernesse	Secretary of State for the Southern Department; 1757–1761	Succeeded by The Earl of Egremont
Preceded by The Marquess of Rockingham	Prime Minister of Great Britain; 30 July 1766 – 14 October 1768	Succeeded by The Duke of Grafton
Preceded by The Duke of Newcastle	Lord Privy Seal; 1766–1768	Succeeded by The Earl of Bristol
Parliament of Great Britain
Preceded by Thomas Pitt; Robert Nedham	Member of Parliament for Old Sarum; 1735–1747; With: Robert Nedham 1735–1741; Sir George Lyttelton, Bt 1741–1742; James Grenville 1742 – May 1747; Edward Willes May–July 1747	Succeeded by Thomas Pitt; Sir William Irby, Bt
Preceded by William Hay; The Hon. William Gage	Member of Parliament for Seaford; 1747–1754; Served alongside: William Hay	Succeeded by William Hay; The Hon. William Gage
Preceded by Andrew Wilkinson; Nathaniel Newnham	Member of Parliament for Aldborough; 1754–1756; Served alongside: Andrew Wilkinson	Succeeded by Andrew Wilkinson; Nathaniel Cholmley
Preceded by Sir George Lyttelton, Bt; Robert Vyner	Member of Parliament for Okehampton; 1756–1757; Served alongside: Robert Vyner	Succeeded by Robert Vyner; Thomas Potter
Preceded by Robert Henley; John Louis Ligonier	Member of Parliament for Bath; 1757–1766; With: The Viscount Ligonier 1757–1763; Sir John Sebright, Bt 1763–1766	Succeeded by Sir John Sebright, Bt; John Smith
Peerage of Great Britain
New creation	Earl of Chatham; 1766–1778	Succeeded by John Pitt
