= Abel Moysey =

English lawyer and politician

Abel Moysey (18 August 1743 – 24 September 1831), of Hinton Charterhouse, Somerset, was an English lawyer and politician who sat in the House of Commons from 1774 to 1790.

Moysey was the only son of Abel Moysey, a Bath physician, and his wife Elizabeth Fortrie, daughter of Rev. John Fortrie, vicar of Washington, Sussex. He was educated at Westminster School in 1756 and matriculated at Christ Church, Oxford in 1760. He was admitted at Lincoln's Inn in 1758 and called to the bar in 1767. He married Charlotte Bampfylde daughter of Sir Richard Warwick Bampfylde, 4th Baronet on 26 December 1774. He succeeded his father in 1780. He became bencher in 1802 and treasurer in 1810.

Moysey was a Member (MP) of the Parliament of Great Britain for Bath from 1774 to 1790.

Parliament of Great Britain
Preceded by Major-General Sir John Sebright; John Smith	Member of Parliament for Bath; 1774–1790; With: John Smith; Lieutenant-General Sir John Sebright; Hon. John Jeffreys Pratt	Succeeded by Viscount Weymouth; Hon. John Jeffreys Pratt
