= 83rd Regiment of Foot (1757) =

- Active: 1757–1763
- Country: Kingdom of Great Britain (1707–1800)
- Branch: British Army
- Type: Infantry

The 83rd Regiment of Foot (1757–1763) was a short-lived infantry regiment in the British Army which was raised in Ireland in 1757 to counter the Spanish Invasion of Portugal of 1762, an offshoot of the Seven Years' War.

After being posted to the Iberian Peninsula in 1762 the regiment was disbanded in Ireland following the Treaty of Paris in 1763.

The Colonel-Commandants of the Regiment were General Sir John Saunders Sebright, Bt. (1758–1760) and General Bigoe Armstrong (1760–1763).
