= John Smith (Bath MP) =

English politician

John Smith (?1727-1775), of Combe Hay, near Bath, Somerset, was an English politician.

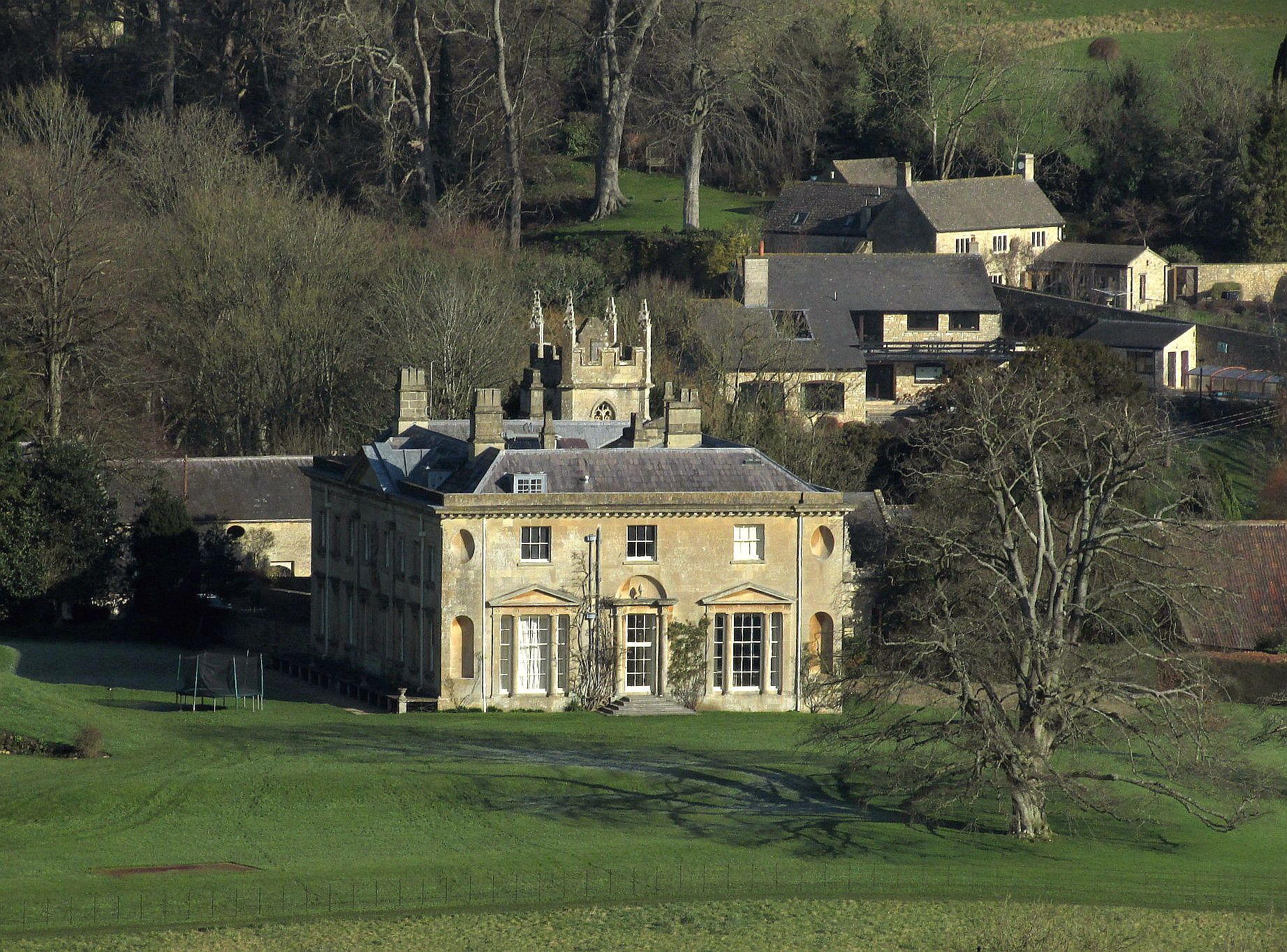
Combe Hay Manor

He was born the eldest son of Robert Smith of Foxcote and Stony Littleton, Somerset and educated at Oriel College, Oxford. He succeeded his father to Combe Hay Manor in 1755 and later extended it.

He was a Member (MP) of the Parliament of Great Britain for Bath 19 November 1766 – 12 November 1775.

He married in 1757 the Hon. Anne Tracy, daughter of Thomas Charles Tracy, 5th Viscount Tracy and left one son, John Smith (1759–1813), who changed his name to John Smith Leigh and was High Sheriff of Somerset for 1811.

Parliament of Great Britain
Preceded by Major-General Sir John Sebright; William Pitt the Elder	Member of Parliament for Bath; 1766– 1775; With: Lieutenant-General Sir John Sebright; Abel Moysey	Succeeded by Abel Moysey; Lieutenant-General Sir John Sebright
