= Chatham Township =

Chatham Township may refer to the following townships in the United States:

- Chatham Township, Sangamon County, Illinois
- Chatham Township, Wright County, Minnesota
- Chatham Township, New Jersey
- Chatham Township, Ohio
- Chatham Township, Ontario
- Chatham Township, Tioga County, Pennsylvania
