= Sir John Sebright, 6th Baronet =

British army general and peer (1725–1794)

General Sir John Sebright Bt
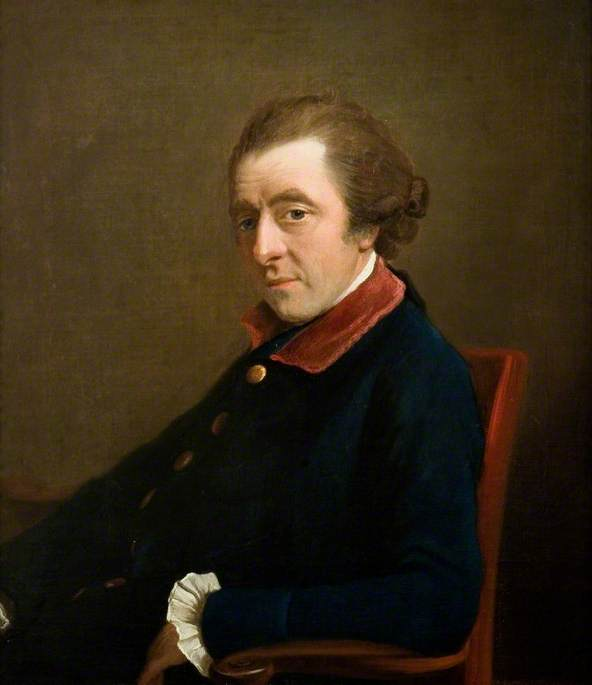
- Portrait by Francis Wheatley, c. 1770
- Born: 19 October 1725; Hertfordshire
- Died: 23 February 1794 (aged 68); Beechwood Park, Hertfordshire
- Alma mater: Westminster School
- Spouse: Sarah Knight (m. 1766)
- Military career
- Allegiance: Great Britain
- Branch: British Army
- Service years: 1741–1794
- Rank: General
- Unit: 1st Foot Guards

Member of Parliament for Bath
- In office 1763–1774
- In office 1775–1780

General Sir John Saunders Sebright, 6th Baronet (19 October 1725 – 23 February 1794) was a British Army officer and a Member of Parliament.

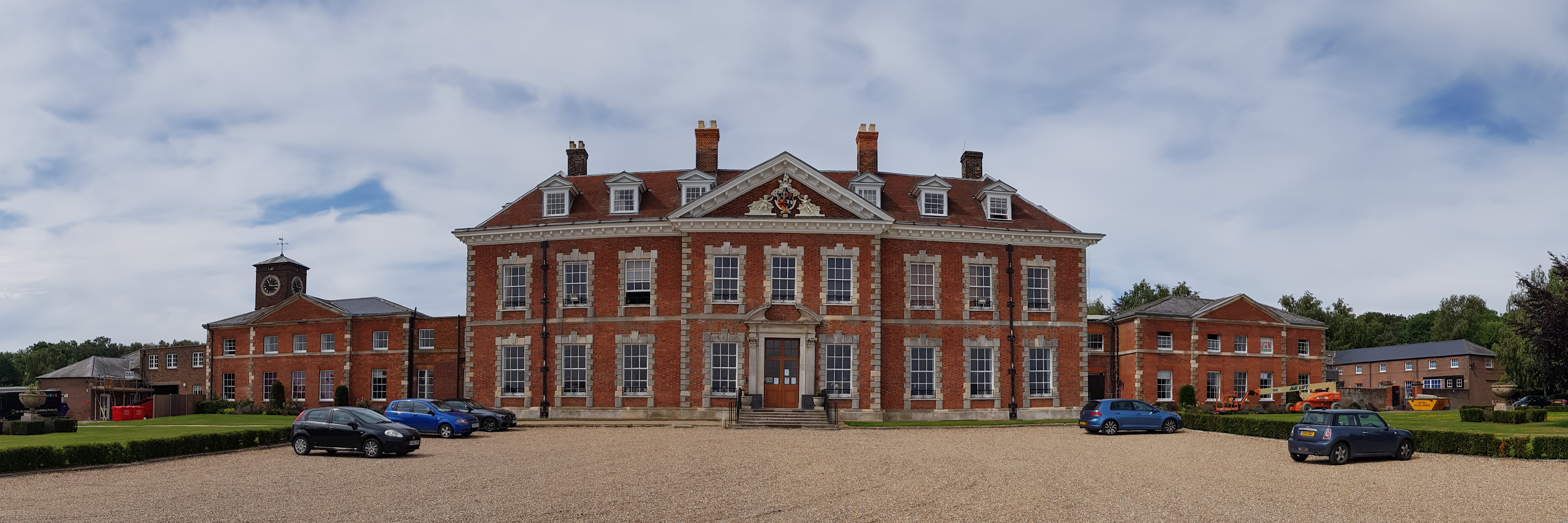
Beechwood Park

== Career ==
Sir John Sebright was a younger son of Sir Thomas Sebright, 4th Baronet and Henrietta Dashwood and was educated at Westminster School. In 1761 he succeeded his elder brother to the baronetcy and the Beechwood Park estate in Hertfordshire.

Sebright was colonel of the 83rd Regiment of Foot from 1758 to 1760, and then the 52nd Regiment of Foot, from 1760 to 1762. In 1762 he was promoted to the Colonelcy of the 18th (Royal Irish) Regiment of Foot, a position he held until his death. He was promoted full general on 20 November 1782.

He was elected MP for Bath in 1763, was defeated in 1774, but returned in a by-election a few months later, sitting until 1780.

He was a close friend of the Irish statesman and writer Edmund Burke. In 1765, on a visit to Sebright's home at Beechwood Park Burke came across a considerable number of medieval Irish manuscripts in the library. The manuscripts had been given to Sebright's father by the antiquary and philologist Edward Lhuyd who had acquired them on a tour of Ireland in 1700. In 1786, these were bequeathed to the library of Trinity College Dublin and formed the foundation of the Irish manuscript collections there. The manuscripts presented by Sebright included the Yellow Book of Lecan and the Book of Leinster.

In 1766, he had married Sarah Knight, daughter of Edward Knight and Elizabeth James, and had 2 sons and 2 daughters. Their eldest son, John, inherited the baronetcy. Their daughter Henrietta Sebright (DOB. 6 May 1770) married Henry Lascelles, 2nd Earl of Harewood.

Military offices
New regiment	Colonel of the 83rd Regiment of Foot; 1758–1760	Succeeded by Bigoe Armstrong
Preceded by Edward Sandford	Colonel of the 52nd Regiment of Foot; 1760–1762	Succeeded by Sir John Clavering
Preceded by John Folliot	Colonel of the 18th Regiment of Foot; 1762–1794	Succeeded by Sir James Murray
Baronetage of England
Preceded by Thomas Saunders Sebright	Baronet (of Besford); 1761–1794	Succeeded by John Saunders Sebright
