= Bigoe Armstrong =

British Army general

General Bigoe Armstrong (10 September 1717 – 24 July 1794) was a senior commander in the British Army in the 18th century.

Bigoe Armstrong was born on 10 September 1717 in County Offaly, Ireland. His father was Michael Armstrong.

Serving in the 18th Regiment of Foot, Armstrong was promoted to lieutenant-colonel on 25 November 1752.

On 26 May 1772, Armstrong was promoted to lieutenant-general and later that year on 13 November, he was appointed the Colonel of the 8th (The King's) Regiment of Foot. Armstrong was promoted to full general on 19 February 1783.

Armstrong died without issue on 24 July 1794 at his home on Upper Wimpole Street near Cavendish Square in London.

Military offices
Preceded by Daniel Webb	Colonel of the 8th (The King's) Regiment of Foot; 1772-1794	Succeeded by Ralph Dundas
