= List of castles in England =

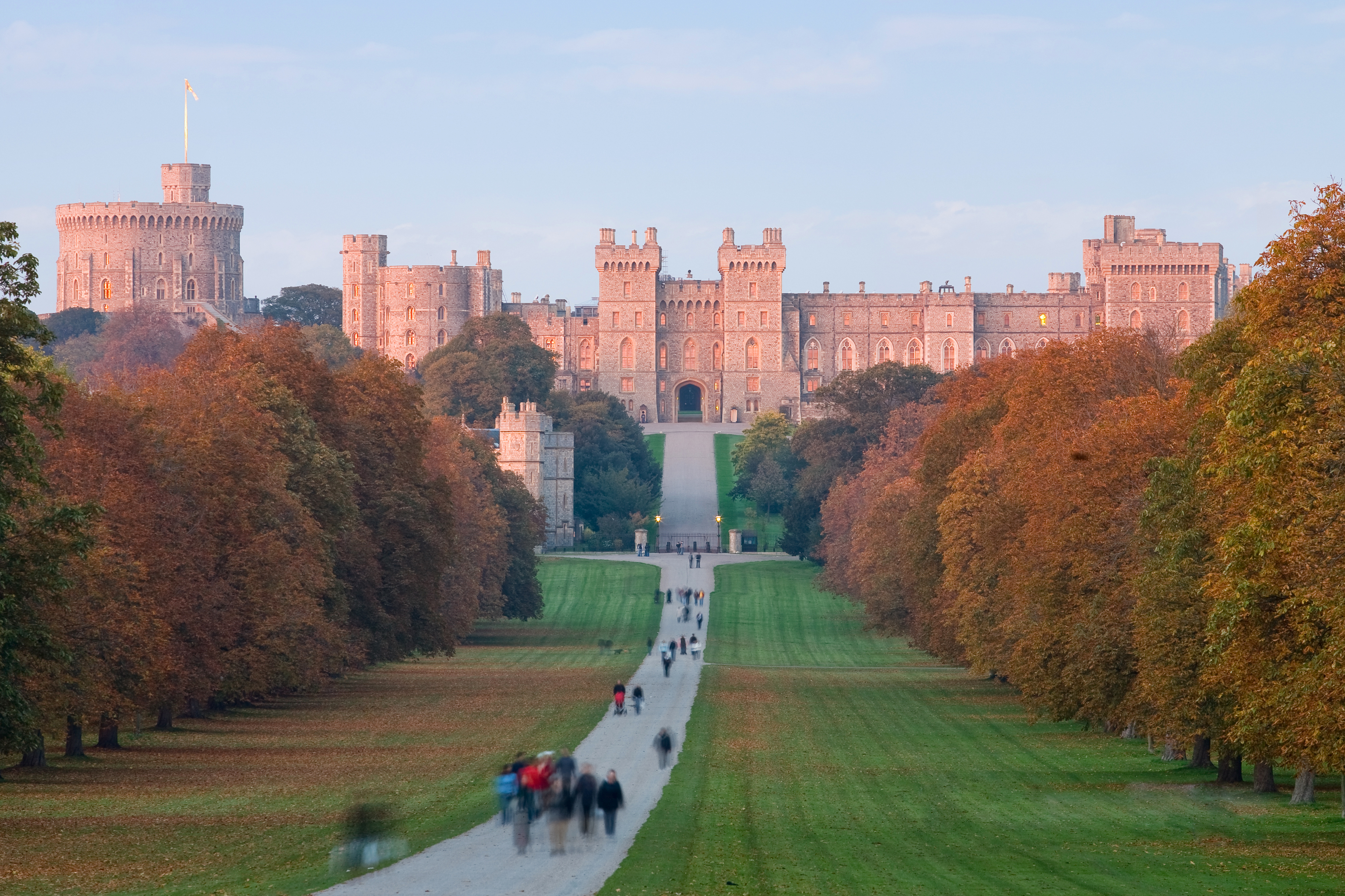
Windsor Castle, Berkshire

This list of castles in England is not a list of every building and site that has "castle" as part of its name, nor does it list only buildings that conform to a strict definition of a castle as a medieval fortified residence. It is not a list of every castle ever built in England, many of which have vanished without trace, but is primarily a list of buildings and remains that have survived. In almost every case the buildings that survive are either ruined, or have been altered over the centuries. For several reasons, whether a given site is that of a medieval castle has not been taken to be a sufficient criterion for determining whether or not that site should be included in the list.

Castles that have vanished or whose remains are barely visible are not listed, except for some important or well-known buildings and sites. Fortifications from before the medieval period are not listed, nor are architectural follies. In other respects it is difficult to identify clear and consistent boundaries between two sets of buildings, comprising those that indisputably belong in a list of castles and those that do not.

The criteria adopted for inclusion in the list include such factors as: how much survives from the medieval period; how strongly fortified the building was; how castle-like the surviving building is; whether the building has been given the title of "castle"; how certain it is that a medieval castle stood on the site, or that the surviving remains are those of a medieval castle; how well-known or interesting the building is; and whether including or excluding a building helps make the list, in some measure, more consistent.

In order to establish a list that is as far as possible comprehensive as well as consistent, it is necessary to establish its boundaries. Before the list itself, a discussion of its scope includes lengthy lists of buildings excluded from the main lists for various reasons. The Castellarium Anglicanum, an authoritative index of castles in England and Wales published in 1983, lists over 1,500 castle sites in England. Many of these castles have vanished or left almost no trace. The present list includes more than 800 medieval castles of which there are visible remains, with over 300 having substantial surviving stone or brick remains.

== History ==
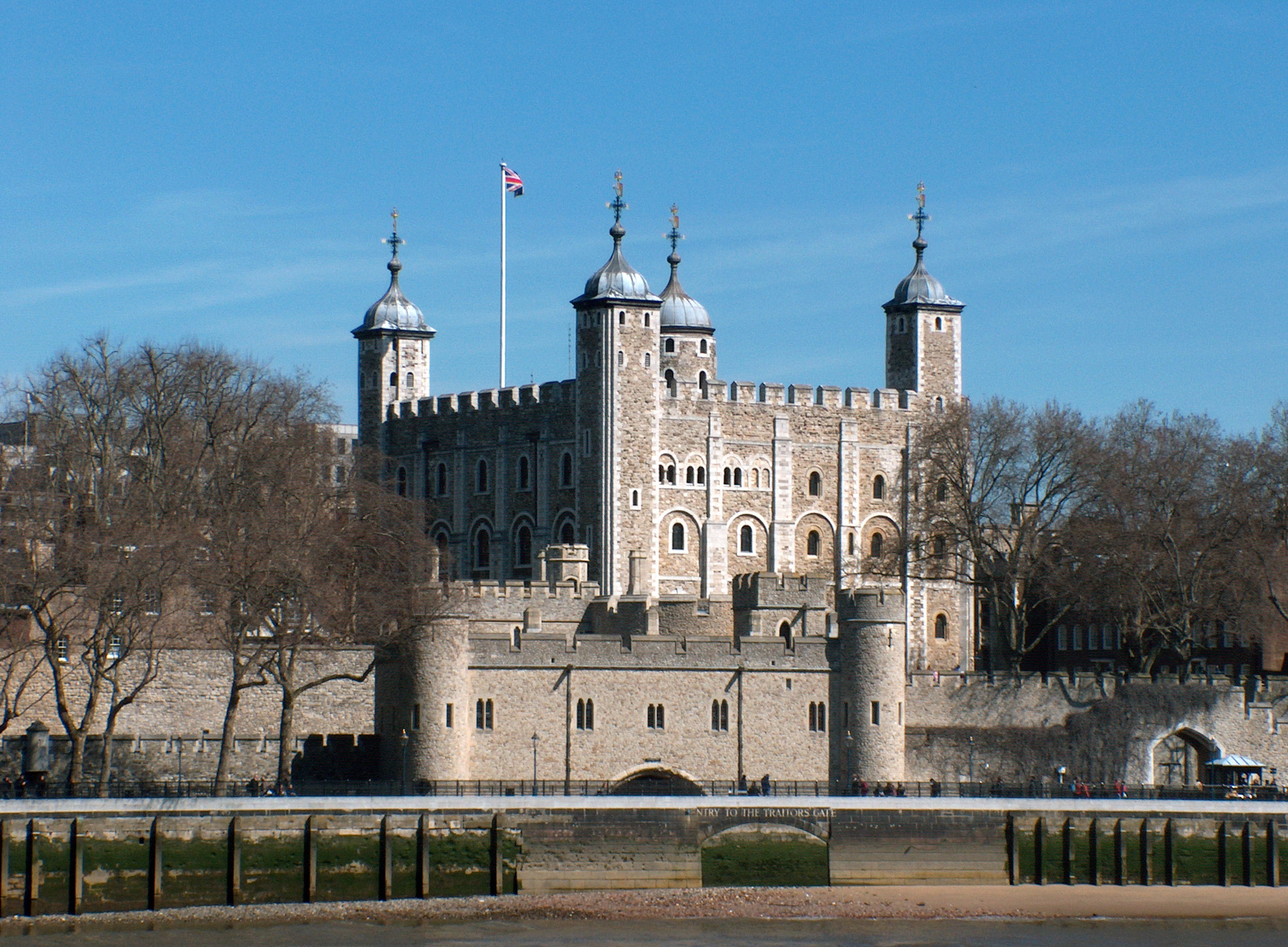
The Tower of London

A castle is a type of fortified structure, developed in Europe during the Middle Ages. The first castles appeared in France in the 10th century, and in England during the 11th century. A few castles are known to have been built in England before the Normans invaded in 1066; a great many were built in the years following, the principal mechanism by means of which the Normans were able to consolidate their control over the country. Whilst a few important castles, such as the White Tower in the Tower of London, were built of stone, most early castles were motte-and-bailey castles of earthwork and timber, which could be constructed quickly. Some were later rebuilt in stone, but there are a great many castle sites in England where all that is visible today are traces of earthworks.

Castles continued to be built in England for several hundred years, reaching a peak of military sophistication in the late 13th century. The two principal elements in their construction were the great tower or keep, such as the White Tower, and the fortified enclosure, such as is provided by the outer wall of the Tower of London. During the 14th century, largely as a result of the decline of feudalism, the construction of strong castles began to decline, in favour of more lightly fortified structures often described as fortified manor houses.

In the far north of England, where conditions remained unsettled, fortified buildings continued to be built as late as the 16th century, not only by the rich and powerful but by any with adequate means, as defence not against great armies, but against the notorious Border Reivers. Many took the form of the pele tower, a smaller, more modest version of the castle keep, and many of these still survive, often incorporated in later buildings.

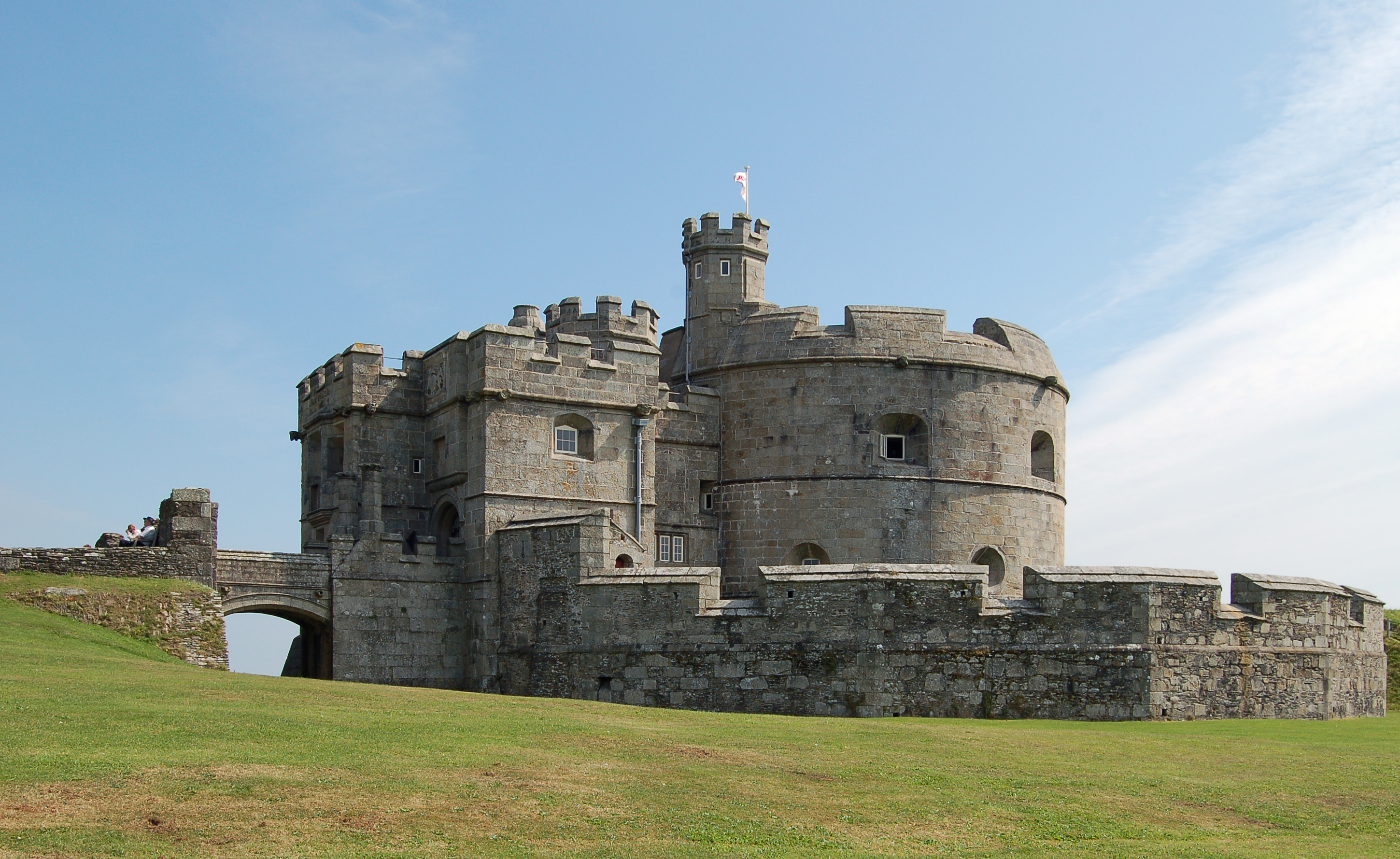
Pendennis Castle, Cornwall, a 16th-century Henrician Castle

Castles differed from earlier fortifications in that they were generally private fortified residences. Typically, a castle was the residence of a feudal lord, providing the owner with a secure base from which to control his lands, and also a symbol of wealth and power. Earlier fortified structures, such as the Saxon burh or the Iron Age hillfort, provided public or communal defences, as did medieval town or city walls. The many Roman forts of which ruins survive in Britain differed in being wholly military in nature; they were camps or strongholds of the Roman army. The Romans also built town or city walls in England, which can still be seen, for instance at Silchester.

By the 16th century the role of fortifications had changed once more with the development of artillery capable of breaching even thick stone walls. In the reign of Henry VIII, fears of invasion led to the building of a series of new fortresses along the south coast of England, known as the Device Forts or Henrician Castles. These were designed to use and to defend against artillery, and since they were not private residences, but national fortifications, they do not possess what architectural historians have come to see as the defining characteristics of a castle. Nonetheless, they are visibly castle-like, being compact, with battlemented walls, squat turrets and sometimes a keep; and they were the last generation of fortresses in England to be known as castles, long before architectural historians began to argue that they should not be. One of them, Pendennis Castle, was one of the last Royalist strongholds to fall to the Parliamentarians during the English Civil War—starvation forcing surrender after a siege of five months.

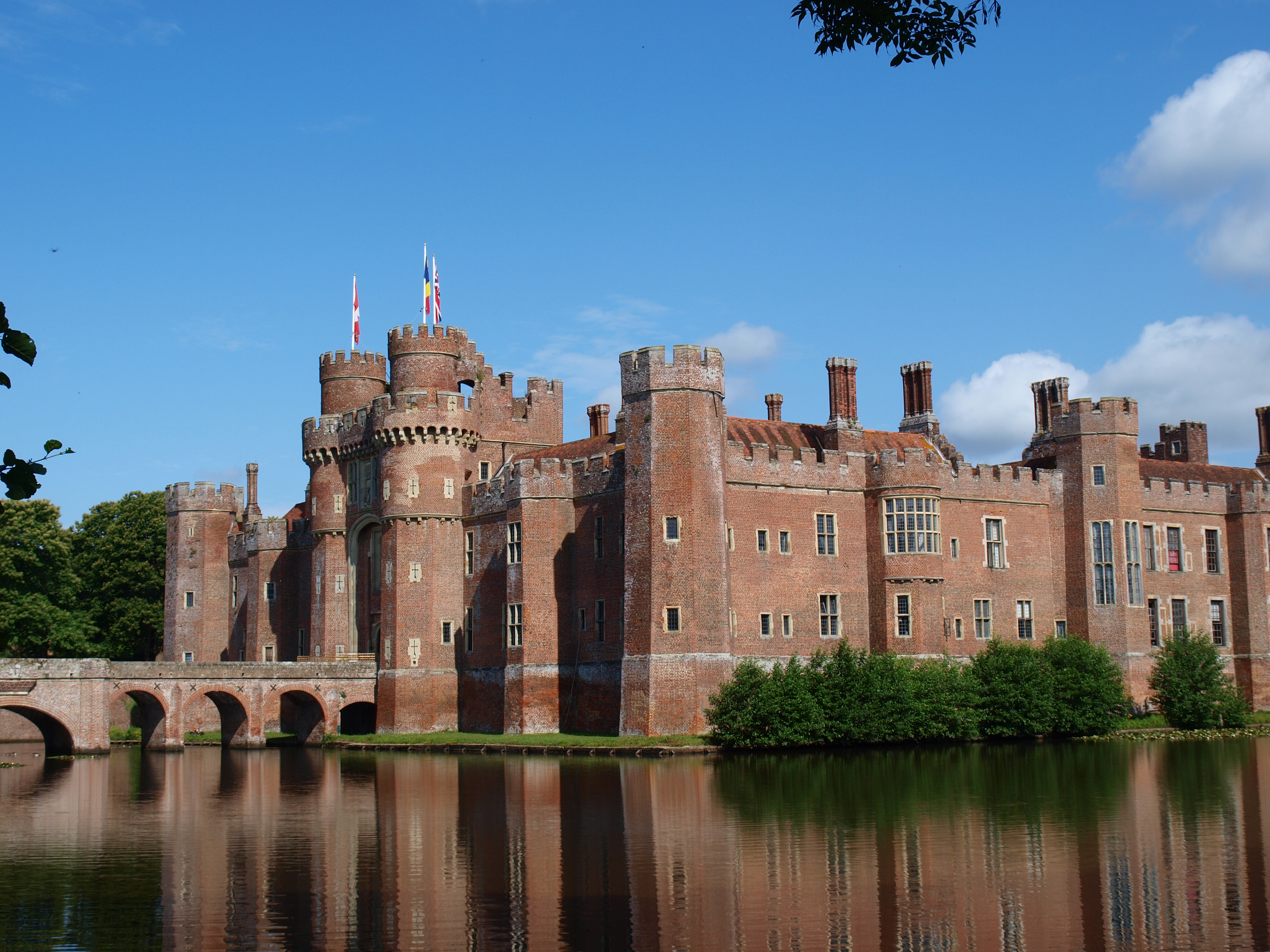
Herstmonceux Castle, East Sussex

As the role of the castle as a fortress declined in the later medieval period, its role as a residence increasingly became the more important. Castles such as Herstmonceux were built with fortifications seemingly designed more for show than for strength, implying a further evolution in the role and concept of the castle, becoming less a means of enforcing power but instead a symbol of its possession, a castle becoming a grand residence proclaiming the status of its owner. Once fortifications had become altogether redundant, it became increasingly rare in England for new buildings to be described as castles, in contrast to France, where country houses continued to be known as châteaux.

Once no longer needed as fortresses, castles – if they were not abandoned – were, over the centuries, adapted and modernised to make them more suitable for continued use as residences: large windows were inserted in defensive walls, as at Lumley; outer walls were demolished or lowered to open up views from within, as at Raby; new residential ranges were built to improve and extend accommodation, as at Windsor. Some castles were restored after falling into ruin, like Bamburgh; others, like Belvoir, were demolished and rebuilt, retaining little or none of the original structure. In the 18th and 19th centuries especially, many castles underwent "improvements" by architects such as Anthony Salvin, and in this period a fashion developed for entirely new houses to be built in the style of castles, and to be known as castles. Amongst these was Peckforton Castle, built by Salvin: a building so authentic in its recreation of a medieval castle that it has been described as possibly the last serious fortified home built in Britain.

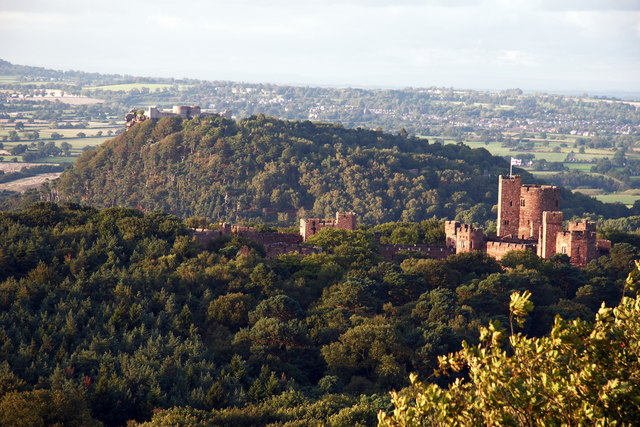
Peckforton Castle, Cheshire, with Beeston Castle in the distance

== Scope and exclusions ==
No list of castles in England is ever likely to be complete, because there will never be complete agreement in every case as to whether the remains of a building are those of a castle, whether a given place is the site of a castle, or whether a surviving building should be considered to be a castle.

Perhaps because the castle has become the most familiar type of fortification, many sites of fortifications earlier than the 10th century have become known as castles. Most of these are Iron Age hill forts. Amongst the best known are Abbotsbury Castle, Barbury Castle, Bratton Castle, Cadbury Castle, Castle Dore, Chûn Castle, Liddington Castle, Maen Castle, Maiden Castle and Uffington Castle, while many more appear in the List of hillforts in England. Others, such as Melandra Castle, Reculver Castle, Richborough Castle and Whitley Castle, are Roman forts, whilst Daw's Castle is a Saxon burh. None of these is included in the present list unless it is also the site of a medieval castle, as is the case with, for instance, Portchester Castle, where an imposing castle was built within the surviving walls of the Roman fort.

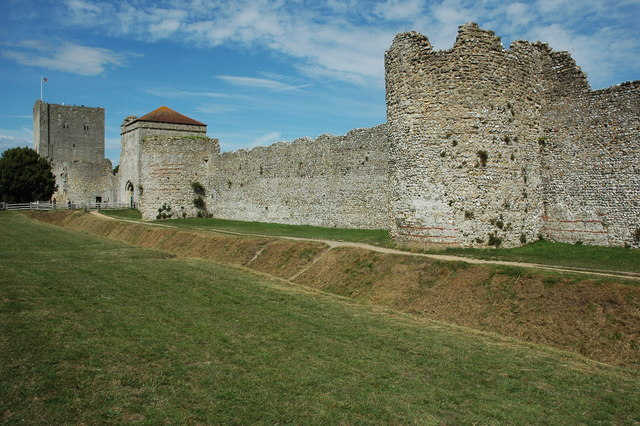
Portchester Castle, Hampshire: Roman walls with layers of red Roman brickwork at right, and a medieval keep at far left

Nor are all medieval fortified sites included in the present list. The remains of town and city walls are excluded—most of these appear in the List of town walls in England and Wales. Also excluded are churches with defensive towers, such as Ancroft, Burgh by Sands, Edlingham, Garway, Great Salkeld and Newton Arlosh, as well as other fortified ecclesiastical sites such as Alnwick Abbey, Battle Abbey, Thornton Abbey, Wetheral Priory, Whalley Abbey and St Mary's Abbey, York.

Some of the pele towers of Northern England are included, but the more modest fortified buildings known as bastles are not, though the distinction between them is not always altogether clear. Amongst fortified manor houses, those given the title of castle are included, whilst many others were more lightly fortified and are excluded. Amongst these are Baddesley Clinton, Cowdray House, Farnhill Hall, Hipswell Hall, Ightham Mote, Little Wenham Hall, Markenfield Hall and Walburn Hall.

The list includes pele towers that became known as castles, or preserve a castle-like aspect. Many others, or their remains, survive much altered—incorporated in later country houses or farmhouses, and are excluded. Amongst these are: Aske Hall, Biddlestone RC Chapel, Bolling Hall, Bolton Old Hall, Boltongate Rectory, Causey Park House, Clennell Hall, Cliburn Hall, Corbridge Low Hall, Cowmire Hall, Craster Arms (Beadnell), Croglin Old Pele, Denton Hall, Dovenby Hall, Dunstan Hall, East Shaftoe Hall, Godmond Hall, Great Salkeld Rectory, Hardrigg Hall, Hepscott Hall, Hetton Hall, Hollin Hall, Hutton Hall (Penrith), Irton Hall, Johnby Hall, Killington Hall, Kirkoswald College, Levens Hall, Little Harle Tower, Nether Hall, Netherby Hall, Ormside Hall, Pockerley Pele, Preston Patrick Hall, Randalholme Hall, Rock Hall, Rudchester Hall, Sella Park, Selside Hall, Skelsmergh Hall, Smardale Hall, Thistlewood Farmhouse, Warnell Hall, Weetwood Hall and Witton Tower.

In the post-medieval period, the distinction between true castles and later mock castles is blurred by the extent to which medieval castles were adapted and rebuilt. At Greystoke a new castle was built incorporating a medieval pele tower; at Thurland a new castle was built from the ruins of the old; at Belvoir the old castle was demolished and a new one built. The building of mock castles might be seen as the logical conclusion of a process already apparent in castles such as Herstmonceux or Tattershall, where the castle-like aspect of the building was becoming more for show than for strength.

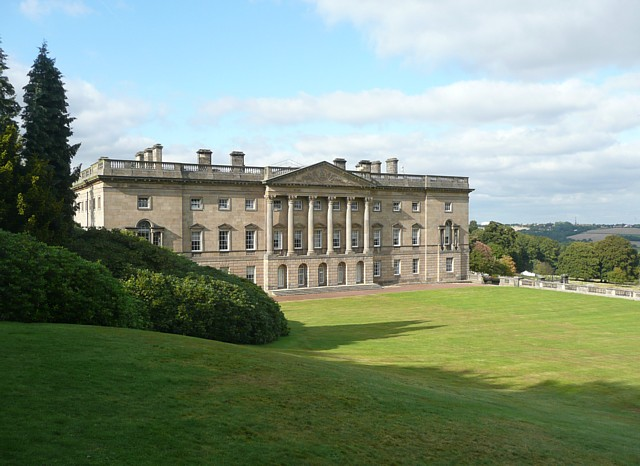
Wentworth Castle in South Yorkshire: not a castle but a country house

Amongst post-medieval buildings in England that are known as castles, a few, such as Peckforton Castle, closely resemble medieval castles. Many others, such as Clearwell Castle, have some castle-like features, and some, like Mereworth Castle, bear no resemblance whatsoever to a castle. The list excludes buildings that neither look like castles, nor incorporate the remains of castles. Amongst these are Bolebroke Castle, Bovey Castle, Bruce Castle, Castle Ashby, Castle Howard, Clifton Castle, Highclere Castle, Mereworth Castle, New Wardour Castle, Sherborne Castle, Wentworth Castle, and Wisbech Castle.

Many other buildings with some castle-like features are also excluded. Amongst these are Acton Castle, Allerton Castle, Augill Castle, Avon Castle, Bell's Castle, Bolesworth Castle, Bude Castle, Castle Eden Castle, Castle Goring, Cave Castle, Cholmondeley Castle, Clearwell Castle, Cliffe Castle, Coates Castle, Creech Castle, Droskyn Castle, Edmond Castle, Enmore Castle, Ewell Castle, Farleigh Castle, Farley Castle, Fillingham Castle, Hatherop Castle, Headingley Castle, Highcliffe Castle, Hilfield Castle, Kenwith Castle, Kirby Knowle Castle, Knepp Castle, Luscombe Castle, Midford Castle, Mulgrave Castle, Otterburn Tower, Pentillie Castle, Reeve Castle, Ryde Castle, St. Clare Castle, Sibdon Castle, Sneaton Castle, Stanhope Castle, Studley Castle, Swinton Castle, The Citadel (Weston-under-Redcastle), Tregenna Castle, Vanbrugh Castle, Wadhurst Castle, Wattisham Castle, Whitehaven Castle, Whitstable Castle, Willersley Castle, and Willsbridge Castle. Amongst those that have been demolished is Steephill Castle.

Artificial ruins and follies, often built as memorials or landscape features, are also excluded. Amongst these are Appley Tower, Black Castle, Bladon Castle, Blaise Castle, Bollitree Castle, Boston Castle, Braylsham Castle, Broadway Tower, Carr Hall Castle, Castlebourne, Clent Castle, Clopton Tower, Dinton Castle, Doyden Castle, Dunstall Castle, Durlston Castle, Fort Putnam, Hadlow Castle, Castle in Hagley Park Lawrence Castle, Long's Park Castle, Mow Cop Castle, Mowbray Castle, Pirton Castle, Radford Castle, Radway Tower, Ragged Castle (Badminton), Rivington Castle, Rodborough Fort, Ross Castle, Rothley Castle, Roundhay Castle, Sebergham Castle, Severndroog Castle, Shaldon Castle, Sham Castle (Bath), Sledmere Castle, Speedwell Castle, Stainborough Castle, Starlight Castle, Stowe Castle, Strattenborough Castle, Sundorne Castle, Toll House (Clevedon) and Wyke Castle. The 16th-century Henrician Castles, whose design was closely inspired by medieval castles, are included, but later military fortifications—with just a few exceptions—are not.

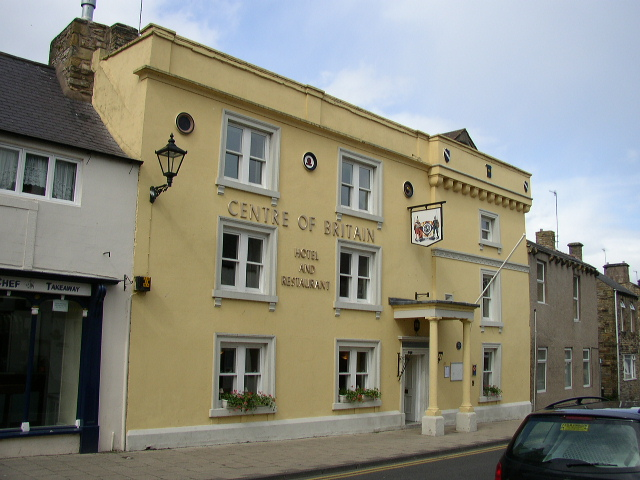
Red Lion Tower, Haltwhistle

However carefully the criteria for including a building or site on this list are set out, borderline cases are inevitable. Many buildings known to incorporate northern pele towers in their fabric, but are no longer castle-like—such as the Red Lion Tower in Haltwhistle—have been excluded. On the other hand, Corby Castle, in which a pele tower survives wholly encased in a later building, is included because it is known as a castle, and by implication continued to fulfil the role of one, at least in part. Kimbolton Castle is included as the site of a medieval castle, and because the present mansion has a castellated aspect in deference to the medieval castle it replaced.

== Key ==
Key
Accessible open space	Accessible open space
	Castle open to the public
	English Heritage
	Historic House open to the public
	Museum
National Trust	National Trust
NGS	Private, grounds open under the National Gardens Scheme
Name	Usually the name of the surviving building, but not always—for instance the remains of the historic Bampton Castle were incorporated in a later building known as Ham Court
Type	Usually the type of castle represented by the predominant surviving fortified remains
Date	Usually the dates of the principal building works relating to the surviving remains
Condition	An indication as to what remains of the original castle structure
Image	The building or site as it currently exists
Ownership / Access	Brief information relating to the current ownership or use of the site, an icon signifying that the site is frequently open to the public

== Bedfordshire ==
Castles of which only earthworks, fragments or nothing remains include:

- Bedford Castle^{†;}
- Biggleswade Castle
- Bletsoe Castle
- Cainhoe Castle
- Chalgrave Castle
- Eastcotts Castle
- Etonbury Castle
- Flitwick Castle
- Higham Gobion Castle
- Odell Castle
- Old Warden Castle
- Podington Castle
- Renhold Castle
- Risinghoe Castle
- Thurleigh Castle
- Tilsworth Castle
- Toddington Castle
- Totternhoe Castle
- Yielden Castle

^{†} Bedford Castle was demolished after a well-documented eight-week siege by Henry III, with around 2000 men, in 1224.

Name	Type	Date	Condition	Image	Ownership / Access	Notes
Someries Castle	Fortified manor house	15th century	Fragmentary remains			Brick, unfinished, ruined gatehouse and chapel survive.

== Berkshire ==
Castles of which only earthworks, fragments or nothing remains include:

- Beaumys Castle
- Newbury Castle
- Hampstead Norris Castle
- West Woodhay Castle
- Yattendon Castle

Name	Type	Date	Condition	Image	Ownership / Access	Notes
Donnington Castle	Castle	c. 1386	Fragment			Built by Richard Abberbury the Elder, destroyed during the English Civil War, gatehouse survives.
Windsor Castle	Keep and bailey	12th–19th centuries	Intact		Royal palace	Restored and extended by James Wyatt and Jeffry Wyattville, 1800–30.

== Bristol ==
Name	Type	Condition	Image	Ownership / Access	Notes
Bristol Castle	Keep and bailey	Fragments		Public park	Destroyed in the Civil War.

== Buckinghamshire ==
Castles of which only earthworks, fragments or nothing remains include:

- Bolbec Castle
- Bradwell Castle
- Buckingham Castle
- Castlethorpe Castle
- Cublington Castle
- Desborough Castle
- Ellesborough Castle (Cymbeline's Mount)
- Lavendon Castle
- Little Kimble Castle
- Little Missenden Castle
- Weston Turville Castle
- Wolverton Castle

Name	Type	Date	Condition	Image	Ownership / Access	Notes
Boarstall Tower	Fortified manor house	c. 1312	Fragment			Moated site, gatehouse survives, altered in the 16–17th centuries, converted to house 20th century.

== Cambridgeshire ==
Castles of which only earthworks, fragments or nothing remains include:

- Aldreth Castle
- Bourn Castle
- Burwell Castle
- Cambridge Castle
- Castle Camps
- Cheveley Castle
- Eaton Socon Castle
- Ely Castle
- Huntingdon Castle
- Maxey Castle
- Peterborough Castle
- Rampton Castle
- Wisbech Castle
- Woodwalton Castle

Name	Type	Date	Condition	Image	Ownership / Access	Notes
Buckden Palace	Fortified manor house	13–15th century	Fragment		Claretian conference centre	Renamed Buckden Towers, partly demolished and remnants incorporated with a 19th-century house.
Elton Hall	Fortified manor house	c. 1477	Fragment			Gatehouse survives, incorporated in building of 1662–1689, remodelled and extended in the 18–19th centuries.
Kimbolton Castle	Castellated house	17–18th century	Intact		School	Site of medieval castle, rebuilt and later remodelled by Sir John Vanbrugh 1707–10.
Kirtling Tower	Fortified manor house	c. 1530	Fragment		NGS	16th-century gatehouse on supposed site of moated Saxon castle.
Longthorpe Tower	Solar tower	1263–1300	Intact			Elaborate scheme of domestic medieval wall paintings. Only the tower is publicly accessible, while the hall is a private house.
Woodcroft Castle	Quadrangular castle	c. 1280	Habitable fragment		Private	West range of original building survives, with alterations.

== Cheshire ==
Castles of which only earthworks, fragments or nothing remains include:

- Aldford Castle
- Dodleston Castle
- Frodsham Castle
- Kingsley Castle
- Macclesfield Castle
- Malpas Castle
- Nantwich Castle
- Newhall Tower
- Northwich Castle
- Oldcastle
- Pulford Castle
- Shipbrook Castle
- Shocklach Castle
- Shotwick Castle
- Warrington Castle

Name	Type	Date	Condition	Image	Ownership / Access	Notes
Beeston Castle	Enclosure castle	13–14th century	Ruins			Sited on crag high above Cheshire Plain, 19th-century outer gatehouse.
Chester Castle	Keep and bailey	12th century	Fragment			Agricola tower sole feature of medieval castle to survive an 18th-century fire.
Doddington Castle	Tower house	c. 1403	Substantially intact		Private	Also known as Delves Hall. Building at Risk.
Halton Castle	Castle	13th century	Fragmentary remains		Duchy of Lancaster	Commanding position, 13th-century tower, 18th-century courthouse, folly of c. 1800.

== County Durham ==
Castles of which only earthworks or vestiges remain include:

- Bishopton Castle
- Cotherstone Castle
- Dalden Tower
- Ludworth Tower
- Streatlam Castle

Name	Type	Date	Condition	Image	Ownership / Access	Notes
Auckland Castle	Fortified palace	12–16th century	Rebuilt		Jonathan Ruffer	The hall is the main survival of the medieval castle, former residence of the Bishop of Durham.
Barnard Castle	Keep and bailey	11–14th century	Ruins			Ruins of four enclosures and a round tower, built by the Balliol family.
Bowes Castle	Keep	12th century	Ruins			Ruins of keep survive.
Brancepeth Castle	Enclosure	14–19th century	Reconstructed		Private	Substantial medieval portions, including 5 towers incorporated in 19th-century rebuilding.
Durham Castle	Motte and bailey	11th-19th century	Intact		University College, Durham	Much altered during continuous occupation since c. 1072.
Lumley Castle	Quadrangular castle	c. 1392	Intact		Hotel / Earl of Scarbrough	Altered c. 1580 and 1721.
Mortham Tower	Fortified manor house	14–16th century	Intact		Private	15th-century tower, formerly in Yorkshire.
Raby Castle	Enclosure	12–14th century	Intact		Lord Barnard	Altered in the 18–19th centuries.
Raby Old Lodge	Tower house	16th century	Restored		Holiday accommodation	Probably built as a hunting lodge for the Neville family of Raby Castle.
Scargill Castle	Tower house	13–15th century	Fragment		Private, farm	Amongst farm buildings.
Walworth Castle	Country house	c. 1600	Restored		Hotel	South-west tower and adjoining wall survive medieval castle within Elizabethan castle-like country house.
Witton Castle	Castle	c. 1410	Restored		Caravan site	Extended in 1790–95. Used as a leisure centre for a caravan site.

== Cornwall ==
Castles of which little or nothing remains include:

- Bossiney Castle
- Bottreaux Castle
- Cardinham Castle
- Helston Castle
- Liskeard Castle
- Penstowe Castle
- Upton Castle

Name	Type	Date	Condition	Image	Ownership / Access	Notes
Carn Brea Castle	Sham castle	15–19th century	Intact		Restaurant	Possible medieval hunting lodge rebuilt in the 18–19th centuries.
Ince Castle	Semi-fortified house	c. 1640	Intact		NGS	House may have been held against the Roundheads in 1646.
Launceston Castle	Keep and bailey	11–13th century	Ruins			
Pendennis Castle	Artillery fort	1540–98	Intact			Withstood 5-month siege in 1646.
Pengersick Castle	Fortified manor house	c. 1510	Fragment			4-storey tower remains, with later building.
Place House, Fowey	Tower house	15–19th century	Rebuilt		Private	Original tower house defended against the French in 1475, subsequently strengthened, later rebuilt.
Restormel Castle	Shell keep	12–13th century	Ruins			
St Catherine's Castle	Artillery fort	1538–40	Ruins			At mouth of River Fowey.
St. Mawes Castle	Artillery fort	1540–3	Intact			Position not defensible from land attack.
St. Michael's Mount	Fortified site	12–17th century	Substantially intact			Castle and priory church comprise single building.
Tintagel Castle	Twin bailey	1227–33	Fragmentary remains			
Trematon Castle	Shell keep	12–13th century	Ruins		Duchy of Cornwall	

== Cumbria ==
Castles of which only earthworks, vestiges or no traces remain include:

- Aldingham Moat Hill
- Castle Howe (Kendal)
- Castle Howe (Tebay)
- Haresceugh Castle
- Hartley Castle
- Hayes Castle
- High Head Castle
- Liddel Strength
- Lowther Castle Stead
- Lowther Castle
- Maryport Castle
- Pennington Castle
- Sedbergh Castle
- Triermain Castle

Name	Type	Date	Condition	Image	Ownership / Access	Notes
Appleby Castle	Keep and bailey	12–17th century	Restored		Private	Restored in the 17th century by Lady Anne Clifford.
Armathwaite Castle	Tower house	15th century	Intact		Private	Incorporated in later buildings.
Arnside Tower	Tower house	15th century	Ruins		Private	Freestanding tower house.
Askerton Castle	Castle	14–16th century	Restored		Private, farm	Altered by Anthony Salvin.
Beetham Hall	Fortified manor house	14th century	Partly ruined		Private	
Bewcastle Castle	Courtyard castle	14–15th century	Fragmentary ruins			Sited within Roman fort.
Bewley Castle	Fortified manor house	13–14th century	Fragmentary ruins		Private	Once a residence of the Bishops of Carlisle.
Blencow Hall	Fortified house	15–16th century	Intact		Holiday accommodation	Altered in 1590.
Brackenburgh Old Tower	Pele tower	14–15th century	Substantially intact		Private	Adjoining large 19th-century house.
Brackenhill Tower	Tower house	1586	Intact		Holiday accommodation	Restored 21st century.
Branthwaite Hall	Pele tower	14–15th century	Intact		Private	17th-century additions.
Brough Castle	Keep and bailey	11–14th century	Ruins			Restored in 1659–62 by Lady Anne Clifford.
Brougham Castle	Keep and bailey	13–14th century	Ruins			Restored in the 17th century by Lady Anne Clifford.
Brougham Hall	Fortified manor house	13–19th century	Ruins		Crafts centre	Ruins of 19th-century house incorporating remains of earlier building.
Broughton Tower	Pele tower	14th century	Intact		School	Incorporated in later building.
Burneside Hall	Tower house	14th century	Ruins		Private	
Carlisle Castle	Keep and bailey	12–15th century	Restored			Adapted for artillery 16th century and converted to barracks 19th century.
Catterlen Hall	Tower house	15th century	Intact		Private	Later additions.
Clifton Hall	Solar tower	16th century	Substantially intact			Used as a farm building until 1973.
Cockermouth Castle	Enclosure castle	13–14th century	Partly restored		Private	19th century buildings within outer bailey.
Corby Castle	Tower house	13th century	Rebuilt		Private	Concealed within a Georgian Mansion House.
Dacre Castle	Tower house	14th century	Restored		Private	Restored in the 17th and 19th centuries.
Dalston Hall	Fortified house	15th century	Intact		Hotel	Later additions.
Dalton Castle	Pele tower	14th century	Restored			Built for Furness Abbey. Remodelled c. 1704 and 1856.
Drawdykes Castle	Tower house	14th century	Intact		Private, farm	Original tower with early Classical Revival facade.
Drumburgh Castle	Tower house	14-16th century	Habitable		Private	Converted into farmhouse.
Egremont Castle	Motte and bailey	12th–13th century	Ruins			
Gleaston Castle	Enclosure castle	14th century	Fragmentary remains		Private	Abandoned late 15th century.
Greystoke Castle	Castle	14–19th century	Rebuilt		Wedding venue	Rebuilt incorporating parts of 14th-century building, remodelled in 1840 by Anthony Salvin.
Harbybrow Tower	Pele tower	15th century	Ruin		Private	Adjoining 19th-century farmhouse.
Hayton Castle	Tower house	14–15th century	Substantially intact		Private	Castle converted to house.
Hazelslack Tower	Pele tower	14th century	Ruins		Private	Near Arnside.
Howgill Castle	Tower house	14th century	Substantially intact		Private	Altered and remodelled in the 17–18th century.
Hutton-in-the-Forest	Pele tower	14–19th century	Rebuilt			Large country-house extensions in the 17th and 19th centuries.
Hutton John	Pele tower	14th century	Intact			Later alterations and additions.
Ingmire Hall	Pele tower	16–20th century	Rebuilt		Private apartments	Incorporated in large, mostly 19th-century mansion.
Isel Hall	Tower house	14–15th century	Intact			Later additions.
Kendal Castle	Ringwork	12–14th century	Fragmentary remains			
Kentmere Hall	Pele tower	14th century	Intact		Private, holiday cottage	Tower restored to use in 2020.
Kirkandrews Tower	Tower house	16th century	Intact		Private	
Kirkoswald Castle	Quadrangular	14th-15th century	Fragmentary ruins		On private farmland	Dismantled in the 17th century and the fittings moved to Naworth.
Lammerside Castle	Tower house	14th century	Ruins		On farmland	
Linstock Castle	Tower house	12–13th century	Restored		Private	Altered and remodelled in the 17–20th century.
Middleton Hall	Fortified manor house	14th century	Habitable		Private	Altered and extended in the 15–19th centuries.
Millom Castle	Tower house and enclosure	14th century	Partly inhabited			Tower house adapted as 18th century farmhouse.
Muncaster Castle	Tower house	13–14th century	Restored			Remodelled by Anthony Salvin, home of Tom Fool, 16th-century jester.
Naworth Castle	Quadrangular	14–16th century	Restored		Wedding venue Earl of Carlisle	Altered and restored in the 18th and 19th centuries.
Netherhall	Tower house	14-15th century	Derelict			Incorporated into later country house, demolished except for the tower after a fire in the 1970s.
Newbiggin Hall	Fortified house	15–16th century	Intact		Private	Remodelled by Anthony Salvin.
Pendragon Castle	Tower house	12–14th century	Ruins			Restored by Lady Anne Clifford.
Penrith Castle	Quadrangular	14–15th century	Ruins			
Piel Castle	Keep and baileys	14th century	Ruins			Also known as Fouldrey Castle. Built for Furness Abbey.
Prior's Tower, Carlisle	Pele tower	15th century	Intact		Church of England	Part of the Deanery, alongside later buildings.
Rose Castle	Quadrangular Castle	15–16th century	Restored		Church of England	Rebuilt after 17th century, Civil War damage residence of the Bishop of Carlisle until 2011.
Scaleby Castle	Tower house	13–15th century	Partly ruined		Private	Incorporates 19th century house.
Sizergh Castle	Tower house	14th century	Restored			Altered and extended round courtyard in the 16th–20th centuries.
Ubarrow Hall	Pele tower	Medieval	Substantially intact		Private	Alongside later building, reduced in height.
Wharton Hall	Fortified manor house	14–17th century	Partly restored		Private	
Whitehall, Mealsgate	Tower house	14–15th century	Substantially intact		Holiday accommodation	Alterations by Anthony Salvin.
Workington Hall	Tower house	14–18th century	Ruins		Local authority	Inhabited until 1929, requisitioned by the army in the Second World War and since allowed to fall into ruin. Also known as Curwen Hall.
Wraysholme Tower	Tower house	15th century	Substantially intact		Private, farm	Used as barn and cow-house, adjoining a 19th-century house.
Yanwath Hall	Pele tower	14th-15th century	Intact		Private	Adjoining original hall and other buildings, now used as a farm.

== Derbyshire ==
Castles of which only earthworks, vestiges or no traces remain include:

- Bakewell Castle
- Derby Castle
- Duffield Castle
- Glossop (Mouselow) Castle
- Gresley Castle (Castle Knob)
- Hathersage Castle
- Holmesfield Castle
- Hope Castle
- Horsley Castle
- Melbourne Castle
- Morley Motte
- Pilsbury Castle

Name	Type	Date	Condition	Image	Ownership / Access	Notes
Bolsover Castle	Castle	12–17th century	Rebuilt			Castle rebuilt as a 17th-century mansion.
Codnor Castle	Castle	13–14th century	Fragmentary remains			
Haddon Hall	Fortified manor house	14–15th century	Intact			Altered in the 16–17th centuries, restored in the 1920s.
Mackworth Castle	Fortified manor house	15th century	Fragment		Private	Ruined gatehouse adjoining farm.
Peveril Castle	Keep and bailey	11–14th century	Ruins			Commanding position above ravine.
Wingfield Manor	Fortified manor house	15th century	Ruins			Abandoned in the 18th century.

== Devon ==
Castles of which only earthworks or vestiges remain include:

- Bampton Castle
- Barnstaple Castle
- Danes Castle
- Durpley Castle
- Blackdown Rings (Loddiswell)
- Eggesford Castle
- Heywood Castle
- Holwell Castle
- Millsome Castle
- Plymouth Castle
- Torrington Castle
- Winkleigh Castle

Name	Type	Date	Condition	Image	Ownership / Access	Notes
Affeton Castle	Fortified manor house	15th century	Fragment		Private	Gatehouse of house sacked during English Civil War, with 19th-century alterations.
Berry Pomeroy Castle	Enclosure castle	15th century	Ruins			Very late castle, designed to defend against artillery.
Bickleigh Castle	Fortified manor house	15th century	Restored		Wedding venue	Incorporated in later buildings.
Compton Castle	Fortified manor house	14–16th century	Restored			Used as farm after 1750, restored 20th century.
Dartmouth Castle	Artillery fort	1481	Intact			Converted to artillery castle 1509–47.
Gidleigh Castle	Keep	c. 1300	Ruins			
Hemyock Castle	Enclosure castle	c. 1380	Fragmentary remains		Private	
Kingswear Castle	Artillery fort	1491–1502	Intact		Landmark Trust	
Lydford Castle	Keep and bailey	12–13th century	Ruins			
Marisco Castle	Keep and bailey	c. 1243	Restored			Restored in 1643.
Okehampton Castle	Keep and bailey	11–14th century	Ruins			
Plympton Castle	Motte and bailey	12th century	Fragmentary remains			Fragmentary shell keep
Powderham Castle	Fortified manor house	14–16th century	Restored		Earl of Devon	Remodelled in the 18th and 19th centuries.
Rougemont Castle (Exeter)	Enclosure castle	11–12th century	Fragments		Wedding venue	Medieval fragments survive with later buildings.
Salcombe Castle	Artillery fort	1540s	Ruins			Refortified in 1643–45.
Tiverton Castle	Quadrangular castle	14th century	Partly habitable			16th-century house built within the castle.
Totnes Castle	Shell keep	11–14th century	Ruins			Well-preserved keep on high motte.

== Dorset ==
Castles of which only earthworks, fragments or nothing remains include:

- Dorchester Castle
- East Chelborough Castle
- Marshwood Castle
- Powerstock Castle
- Sturminster Newton Castle
- Wareham Castle

Name	Type	Date	Condition	Image	Ownership / Access	Notes
Brownsea Castle	Castellated house	16–19th century	Intact			Incorporates part of a 16th-century Henrician Castle.
Christchurch Castle	Motte and bailey	12–14th century	Fragmentary remains			Hall house known as Constable's House survives, with rare Norman chimney.
Corfe Castle	Keep and bailey	11–13th century	Extensive ruins			Besieged and slighted during the English Civil War.
Lulworth Castle	Sham castle	c. 1610	Restored			Hunting lodge, gutted by fire 1929.
Portland Castle	Artillery fort	1539	Intact			Private residence 1816–70.
Rufus Castle	Castle	15th century	Ruins		Private	Also known as Bow and Arrow Castle.
Sandsfoot Castle	Artillery fort	16th century	Ruins		Accessible open space	
Sherborne Old Castle	Keep and bailey	12th century	Ruins			Replaced by 16–17th century house, which became known as Sherborne Castle.
Woodsford Castle	Fortified manor house	14th century	Habitable		Landmark Trust	

== East Riding of Yorkshire ==
Castles of which only earthworks, fragments or nothing remains include:

- Aughton Castle
- Baynard Castle
- Flamborough Castle
- Great Driffield Castle
- Hull Castle
- Hunmanby Castle
- Swine Castle

Name	Type	Date	Condition	Image	Ownership / Access	Notes
Paull Holme Tower	Tower House	15th century	Ruins		Private	Originally part of larger house, roofless.
Skipsea Castle	Motte and Bailey	11th century	Earthworks			Well-preserved earthworks.
Wressle Castle	Quadrangular castle	1390	Ruins		Private, farm	South range remains, inhabited until gutted by fire in 1796.

== East Sussex ==
Castles of which little or nothing remains include:

- Glottenham Castle
- Isfield Castle

Name	Type	Date	Condition	Image	Ownership / Access	Notes
Bodiam Castle	Quadrangular castle	c. 1385	Ruins			Wide moat.
Camber Castle	Artillery fort	c. 1540	Ruins			"Dismantled" 1642 after sea receded.
Hastings Castle	Keep and bailey	12th century	Fragmentary ruins		Local Authority	Ruined by 1399.
Herstmonceux Castle	Fortified mansion	15th century	Restored		Queen's University at Kingston	Brick, interior dismantled in 1777, restored 20th century, former home of Royal Greenwich Observatory, now Study Centre.
Lewes Castle	Keep and bailey	12–14th century	Ruins			Unusual in having two mottes
Pevensey Castle	Keep and bailey	12th century	Ruins			Castle built within surviving walls of Roman fort of Saxon Shore.
Rye Castle (Ypres Tower)	Tower House	c. 1250	Intact			Originally called Baddings Tower.

== Essex ==
Castles of which only earthworks remain include:

- Clavering Castle
- Great Canfield Castle
- Great Easton Castle
- Ongar Castle
- Mount Bures Castle
- Pleshey Castle^{†;}
- Rayleigh Castle
- Stebbing Castle
- Stansted Mountfitchet Castle

^{†} Pleshey Castle is a good example of a motte-and-bailey castle: only earthworks and a medieval brick bridge remain.

Name	Type	Date	Condition	Image	Ownership / Access	Notes
Colchester Castle	Tower keep	11th century	Intact		Local authority	Reduced in height in the 17th century.
Hadleigh Castle	Castle	13–14th century	Fragmentary remains			
Hedingham Castle	Tower keep	1130–40	Substantially intact			Castle demolished in the 17th century except for keep, well-preserved interior despite fire of 1954.
Walden Castle	Keep and bailey	12th century	Fragmentary remains			Remains of keep.

== Gloucestershire ==
Castles of which only earthworks, fragments or nothing remains include:

- Bledisloe Tump
- Brimpsfield Castle
- Castle Hale (Painswick)
- Castle Tump (Dymock)
- Cirencester Castle
- English Bicknor Castle
- Gloucester Castle
- Hailes Castle (Stanway)
- Haresfield Mount
- Hewelsfield Motte
- Holme Castle (Tewkesbury)
- Little Camp Hill (Lydney)
- Littledean Camp
- Miserden Castle
- Newington Bagpath Motte
- Newnham on Severn Castle
- Ruardean Castle
- South Cerney Castle
- Stow Green (St. Briavels)
- Taynton Castle
- Weston Park (Saintbury)
- Winchcombe Castle

Name	Type	Date	Condition	Image	Ownership / Access	Notes
Berkeley Castle	Keep and bailey	12–14th century	Intact			Largely unaltered until the 1920s, when interior modernised by 8th Earl of Berkeley.
Beverstone Castle	Pentagonal castle	13–15th century	Ruins		NGS	17th-century house built within ruins.
St. Briavel's Castle	Keep and bailey	13th century	Habitable			Youth hostel.
Sudeley Castle	Quadrangular castle	15th century	Restored			Restored as a country house in the 19th century.
Thornbury Castle	Quadrangular castle	c. 1511	Substantially intact		Hotel	Left incomplete in 1521; restored in the 19th century.

== Greater London ==
Castles of which no traces remain include:

- Baynard's Castle
- Montfichet's Castle
- Greenwich Castle

The table does not include The White House, a replica of a Polish palace in London.

Name	Type	Date	Condition	Image	Ownership / Access	Notes
Tower of London	Concentric castle	11–13th century	Intact		Historic Royal Palaces	White Tower built c. 1077–1100, curtain walls added in the 13th century, working portcullis.
Manor Farm, Ruislip	Motte-and-bailey castle	11th century	Earthworks		Public access	

== Greater Manchester ==
Castles of which only earthworks, fragments or nothing remains include:

- Bury Castle
- Buckton Castle
- Dunham Castle
- Manchester Castle
- Rochdale Castle
- Stockport Castle
- Ullerwood Castle
- Watch Hill Castle

Name	Type	Date	Condition	Image	Ownership / Access	Notes
Radcliffe Tower	Tower house	1403	Fragment		Local authority	Ruinous tower formerly incorporated in timber house.

== Hampshire ==
Castles of which only earthworks or vestiges remain include:

- Ashley Castle
- Basing House
- Crondall Barley Pound
- Godshill Castle
- Merdon Castle
- Powderham Castle (Crondall)
- Rowland's Castle
- St Andrew's Castle
- Warblington Castle
- Woodgarston Castle

Name	Type	Date	Condition	Image	Ownership / Access	Notes
Bishop's Waltham Palace	Fortified manor house	12th-15th century	Ruined			Burnt in the Civil War.
Calshot Castle	Artillery fort	16th century	Substantially intact			Altered in the 18th–20th centuries, in use until 1961.
Hurst Castle	Artillery fort	16th century	Substantially intact			Repaired and refortified in the 19th century.
Netley Castle	Artillery fort	16–19th century	Rebuilt		Private	Remodelled and extended in 1885–90.
Odiham Castle	Shell keep and bailey	Early 13th century	Fragmentary ruins		Local authority	Built by King John.
Portchester Castle	Keep and bailey	11–12th century	Extensive ruins			Built within surviving walls of Roman fort of the Saxon Shore.
Southampton Castle	Keep and bailey	11–14th century	Fragments			North bailey wall survives.
Southsea Castle	Artillery fort	16th century	Rebuilt		Local authority	Altered several times.
Winchester Castle	Motte and bailey	11–13th century	Fragment		Local authority	Great hall survives, reroofed in 1873.
Wolvesey Castle	Castle	12th century	Ruins			

== Herefordshire ==
Castles of which little or no traces remain include:

- Almeley Castle
- Ashton Castle
- Bredwardine Castle
- Bronsil Castle
- Colwall Castle
- Dorstone Castle
- Eardisland Castle
- Eardisley Castle
- Edvin Loach Castle
- Ewyas Harold Castle^{†;}
- Hereford Castle
- Huntington Castle
- Kilpeck Castle
- Kingsland Castle
- Kington Castle
- Lingen Castle
- Lyonshall Castle
- Much Marcle Castle
- Newcourt Tump (Bacton)
- Newton Tump (Clifford)
- Orcop Castle
- Penyard Castle
- Pipe Aston Castle
- Richard's Castle
- Stapleton Castle
- Urishay Castle
- Wacton Castle
- Walford Castle
- Walterstone Castle

^{†} Ewyas Harold Castle is recorded in the Domesday Book and was probably built c. 1048.

Name	Type	Date	Condition	Image	Ownership / Access	Notes
Brampton Bryan Castle	Fortified manor house	13–14th century	Ruins		Private	Gatehouse survives.
Clifford Castle	Motte and bailey	11–13th century	Fragments		Private	Building at Risk.
Croft Castle	Quadrangular castle	14th century	Rebuilt			Converted to a 16/17th-century house.
Goodrich Castle	Keep and enclosure	12–13th century	Ruins			Partly demolished during English Civil War.
Hampton Court	Fortified manor house	1427	Intact			Remodelled in 1830–40s.
Kentchurch Court	Fortified manor house	14th century	Fragment			Medieval tower and gateway survive, remainder largely rebuilt by Nash 1795–1807.
Kinnersley Castle	Castle	Medieval	Rebuilt			16–17th-century house on the site of a medieval castle.
Longtown Castle	Keep and bailey	12–13th century	Fragmentary ruins			Circular keep.
Pembridge Castle	Keep and bailey	12–13th century	Restored		Private	Reconstructed 20th century.
Snodhill Castle	Keep and bailey	11–14th century	Fragmentary ruins			
Treago Castle	Fortified manor house	15–16th century	Restored		Private	Altered in the 17–19th centuries.
Wigmore Castle	Keep and bailey	11–14th century	Fragmentary ruins			Partly dismantled in 1643.
Wilton Castle	Castle	13th century	Fragmentary ruins			Remains incorporated in a 19th-century house.

== Hertfordshire ==
Castles of which only earthworks, fragments or nothing remains include:

- Anstey Castle
- Benington Castle
- Pirton Castle
- South Mimms Castle
- Therfield Castle
- Walkern Castle
- Waytemore Castle
- Wymondley Castle

Name	Type	Date	Condition	Image	Ownership / Access	Notes
Berkhamsted Castle	Motte and bailey	11–13th century	Fragmentary remains			Double Moat. Unoccupied since 1495.
Hertford Castle	Motte and bailey	11–12th century	Fragments		Local authority	15th-century gatehouse survives, altered and extended in the 18–20th centuries.

== Isle of Wight ==
Castles of which little or nothing remains include:

- East Cowes Castle

Name	Type	Date	Condition	Image	Ownership / Access	Notes
Carisbrooke Castle	Keep and bailey	12–14th century	Substantially intact			Refortified in the 1590s as artillery fortress, former seat of the Governor of the Isle of Wight.
Yarmouth Castle	Artillery fort	1547	Substantially intact			Altered in the 17th century.
West Cowes Castle	Artillery fort	16–19th century	Rebuilt		Royal Yacht Squadron	Fragments of a 16th-century structure incorporated in a later building.

== Isles of Scilly ==
Castles of which only vestiges remain include:

- Ennor Castle
- Harry's Walls
- King Charles's Castle

Name	Type	Date	Condition	Image	Ownership / Access	Notes
Cromwell's Castle	Artillery tower	1651	Substantially intact			
Star Castle	Artillery fort	1593	Intact		Hotel	Important and complete example of Elizabethan fort.

== Kent ==
Castles of which little or nothing remains include:

- Binbury Castle
- Brenchley Castle
- Castle Toll (Newenden)
- Folkestone Castle
- Newnham Castle
- Queenborough Castle
- Sandown Castle
- Sandwich Castle
- Stowting Castle
- Thurnham Castle

Name	Type	Date	Condition	Image	Ownership / Access	Notes
Allington Castle	Fortified house	13–14th century	Restored		Wedding venue	Restored in 1905–1929.
Canterbury Castle	Tower keep	12th century	Ruins		Local Authority	Demolished in 1792.
Chiddingstone Castle	Neo-romantic castle	19th century	Intact			17th-century building converted to a castle in the 19th century.
Chilham Castle	Keep and bailey	11–14th century	Intact		NGS	Keep survives with Jacobean house.
Cooling Castle	Keep and bailey	1380s	Part ruined		Private	Well-preserved gatehouse survives, barns used for events.
Deal Castle	Artillery fort	16th century	Intact			Formerly residence of Captain of the Cinque Ports.
Dover Castle	Concentric castle	12–13th century	Intact			Adapted for modern warfare 18–19th centuries.
Eynsford Castle	Castle	12th century	Fragmentary ruins			
Hever Castle	Fortified manor house	14th century	Restored			Restored early 19th century, working portcullis.
Leeds Castle	Castle	12–15th century	Restored			Extensively rebuilt in 1822 and 1926.
Leybourne Castle	Castle	13th century	Fragmentary ruins		Private	16th-century house partly incorporating ruins, rebuilt in 1931.
Lullingstone Castle	Semi-fortified house	1543–80	Fragment			16th-century gatehouse incorporated into a later house.
Lympne Castle	Fortified house	13–14th century	Restored		Wedding venue	Restored and extended in 1907–12.
Otford Palace	Fortified manor house	16th century	Ruins		Local Authority	The palace was one of the chain of houses belonging to the archbishops of Canterbury.
Penshurst Place	Fortified manor house	14–15th century	Fragment			Remodelled in the 19th century, single tower and stretch of wall survive from fortifications of c. 1400.
Rochester Castle	Tower keep	1127	Ruins			Keep 125 ft (38 m) high to top of turrets.
St Leonard's Tower, West Malling	Tower keep	1080	Ruins			
Saltwood Castle	Castle	12–14th century	Part restored		Private	
Sandgate Castle	Artillery fort	1539–40	Substantially intact		Private	Altered in 1805–06.
Scotney Castle	Fortified manor house	1378–80	Fragment			Single surviving tower incorporated in later house.
Sissinghurst Castle	Fortified manor house	15th century	Rebuilt			No fortifications remaining.
Starkey Castle	Manor house	14th century	Fragment		Private	Fine medieval hall-house remains from possibly fortified manor house.
Stone Castle	Tower	12th century	Intact		Wedding venue	Medieval tower incorporated in building of 1825.
Sutton Valence Castle	Keep and bailey	12th century	Fragmentary remains			
Tonbridge Castle	Keep and bailey	11–13th century	Fragment		Local authority	Gatehouse survives.
Upnor Castle	Artillery fort	1559–67, 1599–1601	Substantially intact			
Walmer Castle	Artillery fort	1539	Intact			Residence of the Lord Warden of the Cinque Ports from the 18th century.
Westenhanger Castle	Fortified manor house	c. 1343	Fragment		Wedding venue	18th-century farmhouse built within ruins.

== Lancashire ==
Castles of which only earthworks or vestiges remain include:

- Arkholme Motte
- Castle Stede
- Greenhalgh Castle
- Halton Castle
- Hapton Castle
- Melling Motte
- Penwortham Castle
- Whittington Motte

Name	Type	Date	Condition	Image	Ownership / Access	Notes
Ashton Hall	Tower house	14–19th century	Intact		Lancaster Golf Club	Near Stodday, 14th-century tower incorporated into a later building.
Borwick Hall	Pele tower	14th century	Intact		Outdoor education centre	Incorporated in mainly 16th-century building.
Clitheroe Castle	Keep and bailey	11–12th century	Ruins			
Hornby Castle	Keep	13th century	Fragment		Private	Keep rebuilt early 16th century, incorporated into an 18–19th-century house.
Lancaster Castle	Keep and bailey	11–12th century	Intact		Local authority	Prison from 1745, 20th-century Shire Hall replaced medieval buildings, now Crown Court.
Thurland Castle	Fortified manor house	14–15th century	Rebuilt		Private apartments	Near Tunstall, ruins rebuilt in 1879–85.
Turton Tower	Pele tower	15th century	Intact			Incorporated in later building.

== Leicestershire ==
Castles of which only earthworks or vestiges remain include:

- Donington Castle
- Earl Shilton Castle
- Gilmorton Castle
- Groby Castle
- Hallaton Castle
- Hinckley Castle
- Mountsorrel Castle
- Sapcote Castle
- Sauvey Castle
- Shackerstone Castle
- Shawell Castle
- Whitwick Castle

Name	Type	Date	Condition	Image	Ownership / Access	Notes
Ashby de la Zouch Castle	Keep	12–15th century	Fragmentary ruins			Fortified manor converted to castle in 1474, slighted during English Civil War.
Belvoir Castle	Neo-romantic castle	17–19th century	Intact		Duke of Rutland	Rebuilt in 1655–68 incorporating fragments of medieval castle, remodelled in 1801–30.
Kirby Muxloe Castle	Quadrangular castle	1480–3	Fragmentary ruins			Unfinished.
Leicester Castle	Castle	12–13th century	Fragments		Local authority	Great hall survives, much altered.

== Lincolnshire ==
Castles of which only earthworks or vestiges remain include:

- Barrow upon Humber Castle
- Bourne Castle
- Bytham Castle
- Carlton Castle
- Folkingham Castle
- Gainsborough Castle
- Goltho Castle^{†;}
- Hough-on-the-Hill Castle
- Heydour Castle
- Kingerby Castle
- Owston Ferry (Kinaird) Castle
- Sleaford Castle
- Stamford Castle
- Tothill Castle
- Welbourn Castle
- Withern Castle

^{†} Goltho Castle was built on the site of a Saxon fortified dwelling of c. 850, established by excavation.

Name	Type	Date	Condition	Image	Ownership / Access	Notes
Bolingbroke Castle	Enclosure castle	13–14th century	Fragmentary ruins			Slighted after brief siege in 1643.
Grimsthorpe Castle	Country house	13th century	Fragment			Remodelled in 18th and 19th centuries, retains a 13th-century south-east tower.
Hussey Tower	Tower house	14–15th century	Ruins			
Kyme Tower	Castle	14th century	Fragment		Private	
Lincoln Castle	Keep and bailey	11–13th century	Substantially intact		Local Authority	Double motte and bailey.
Rochford Tower	Fortified house	15–16th century	Fragment		Private	2 miles east of Boston.
Somerton Castle	Quadrangular castle	1281–1305	Fragment		Private	Single tower survives, adjoining a 17th-century building.
Tattershall Castle	Tower	1430s	Intact			Brick tower built for Ralph Cromwell, restored in 1911–25 by Lord Curzon.
Torksey Castle	Semi-fortified house	16th century	Fragmentary ruins		Private	Slighted during English Civil War.

== Merseyside ==
Castles of which little or no traces remain include:

- Liverpool Castle
- Liverpool Tower
- West Derby Castle

Name	Type	Date	Condition	Image	Ownership / Access	Notes
Brimstage Hall	Tower house	c. 1398	Substantially intact		Crafts centre	Tower incorporated in later building of 16th and 19th centuries.

== Norfolk ==
Castles of which only earthworks or vestiges remain include:

- Two Castles at Buckenham
- Denton Castle
- Dilham Castle
- Gresham Castle
- Horsford Castle
- Hunworth Castle
- Middleton Mount
- Mileham Castle
- North Elmham Castle
- Thetford Castle^{†;}
- Wormegay Castle

^{†} The surviving motte of Thetford Castle is one of the highest in England, about 80 ft (24 m) high.

Name	Type	Date	Condition	Image	Ownership / access	Notes
Baconsthorpe Castle	Fortified manor house	15th century	Fragmentary ruins			
Burgh Castle	Motte and bailey	12th century	No visible remains		/ Norfolk Archaeological Trust	Site of medieval motte and bailey castle within surviving walls of Roman fort of Saxon Shore.
Caister Castle	Quadrangular castle	1432–46	Fragmentary ruins			Moated, largely brick, built by John Fastolf, a relatively intact 90 ft (27 m) tower remains.
Castle Acre Castle	Motte and bailey	11–12th century	Fragmentary remains		English Heritage	Extensive earthworks.
Castle Rising Castle	Keep	c. 1138	Ruins		English Heritage/Lord Rising	
Claxton Castle	Castle	14–15th century	Fragmentary ruins		Private	
Norwich Castle	Keep	c. 1095–1110	Intact		Norfolk Museums and Archaeology Service	Prison during 18–19th centuries.
Oxburgh Hall	Fortified manor house	c. 1482	Intact		National Trust	18th- and 19th-century additions.
Weeting Castle	Fortified manor house	12th century	Fragmentary ruins			

== Northamptonshire ==
Castles of which little or no traces remain include:

- Alderton Castle
- Benefield Castle
- Bury Mount (Towcester)
- Castle Dykes (Farthingstone)
- Fotheringhay Castle^{†;}
- Lilbourne Castle
- Little Houghton Castle
- Long Buckby Castle
- Moor End Castle
- Northampton Castle
- Sulgrave Castle
- Titchmarsh Castle

^{†} Fotheringhay Castle was the scene of the trial and execution of Mary, Queen of Scots in 1587.

Name	Type	Date	Condition	Image	Ownership / Access	Notes
Astwell Castle	Fortified manor house	15th century	Fragment		Private, farm	Gatehouse survives alongside a 17th-century house.
Barnwell Castle	Enclosure castle	c. 1266	Ruins		Private	Curtain wall and towers survive, possibly never completed.
Rockingham Castle	Motte and bailey	13–19th century	Rebuilt			13th century-gatehouse survives, largely rebuilt in the 16th century, remodelled in 1660 and by Anthony Salvin in the 19th century.
Thorpe Waterville Castle	Fortified manor house	14th century	Fragment		Private	Great hall with fine open roof survives, altered for use as a barn.

== Northumberland ==
Castles of which little or nothing remains include:

- Cornhill Castle
- Dally Castle
- Duddo Tower
- Elsdon Castle
- Ford Parson's Tower
- Great Tosson Tower
- Haggerston Castle
- Haltwhistle Castle
- Heiferlaw Tower
- Hepple Tower
- Hethpool Tower
- Howtel Tower
- Kyloe Tower
- Little Swinburne Tower
- Lowick Castle
- Nafferton Castle
- Overgrass Tower
- Ponteland Castle
- Simonburn Castle
- Staward Peel
- Tarset Castle
- Thornton Tower
- Twizell Castle
- Warden Castle
- Wark Castle
- Welton Hall
- West Lilburn Tower
- Widdrington Castle

Name	Type	Date	Condition	Image	Ownership / Access	Notes
Alnham Vicars Pele	Pele tower	14th century	Restored		Private	
Alnwick Castle	Keep and bailey	12–14th century	Restored		Duke of Northumberland	Remodelled by Robert Adam and Anthony Salvin.
Aydon Castle	Fortified manor house	14th century	Intact			Converted to farmhouse 17th century.
Bamburgh Castle	Keep and bailey	12–14th century	Restored		Lord Armstrong	Ruinous by 1704, extensively restored in 1894–1904.
Barmoor Castle	Tower house	14–19th century	Rebuilt		Private	19th-century mansion incorporating remains of a 14th-century building. On the Heritage at Risk Register.
Beaufront Castle	Neo-romantic castle	1836–1841	Intact		Private	19th-century mansion on the site of a 15th-century tower house.
Bellister Castle	Castle	13–14th century	Fragmentary remains		Private	Ruins adjoining a 17th-century house.
Belsay Castle	Tower house	1439–60	Intact			Later ruined building attached.
Berwick Castle	Castle	12–13th century	Fragmentary remains			Site now partly occupied by Berwick Station.
Bitchfield Castle	Pele tower	14th century	Restored		Private	Incorporated in later mansion.
Blenkinsop Castle	Tower house	14th century	Ruins		Private	Incorporated into a 19th-century house.
Bothal Castle	Castle	14th century	Rebuilt		Private	Extensively restored in the 19th century.
Bywell Castle	Castle	15th century	Fragments		Private	Gatehouse survives.
Callaly Castle	Pele tower	14–15th century	Intact		Private apartments	Incorporated in later country house.
Cartington Castle	Pele tower and extensions	14–15th century	Fragmentary remains		Private	
Chillingham Castle	Quadrangular castle	1344	Intact			Altered in the 17–19th centuries, restored after 1982.
Chipchase Castle	Tower house	14th century	Intact			Incorporated in Jacobean house, altered in the 18–19th centuries.
Cocklaw Tower	Tower house	14–15th century	Shell		Private, farm	Near Wall.
Cockle Park Tower	Tower house	c. 1517	Substantially intact		Newcastle University	
Corbridge Vicar's Pele	Pele tower	1318	Intact			Re-roofed in 1910.
Coupland Castle	Tower house	16–17th century	Restored		Private	Later additions.
Craster Tower	Pele tower	14–15th century	Intact		Holiday accommodation	Incorporated in later building.
Crawley Tower	Pele tower	14th century	Ruins		Private	A cottage was built within the walls in the 18th century.
Cresswell Castle	Pele tower	15th century	Ruin			18th century-parapet.
Dilston Castle	Tower house	15th century	Ruins			Altered in the 16–17th century, later buildings demolished.
Dunstanburgh Castle	Keep and bailey	14th century	Fragmentary ruins			Spectacular coastal setting.
Edlingham Castle	Keep and bailey	14th century	Fragmentary ruins			
Elsdon Tower	Pele tower	16th century	Intact		Private	Altered, rectory until 1960, restored in the 1990s.
Embleton Tower	Pele tower	14th century	Intact		Private	19th-century vicarage attached.
Etal Castle	Castle	14th century	Fragmentary ruins			
Featherstone Castle	Castle	14th century	Intact		Private	14th-century tower, three further towers added in the 18–19th century.
Ford Castle	Quadrangular castle	14th century	Substantially intact		Private	Converted into mansion in the 17th century.
Halton Castle	Tower house	13–14th century	Intact		Private	Attached to later house.
Harbottle Castle	Keep and bailey	12–14th century	Fragmentary ruins		Northumberland National Park	Captured by Robert Bruce in 1318.
Haughton Castle	Tower house	13–14th century	Restored		Private	Altered in the 18–19th centuries.
Hexham Moot Hall and Old Gaol	Fortified towers	14–15th century	Intact			Probably once connected by bailey wall, AD1415 list of castles has "Turris de Hexham".
Horsley Tower, Longhorsley	Pele tower	16th century	Intact		Private	
Langley Castle	Tower house	c. 1350	Restored		Hotel	Restored in the 1890s.
Lemmington Hall	Tower house	15th century	Restored		Wedding venue	Incorporated in later house.
Lindisfarne Castle	Artillery fort	16th century	Restored			Remodelled by Edwin Lutyens 1901.
Mitford Castle	Keep and bailey	11–13th century	Fragmentary ruins			
Morpeth Castle	Castle	1342–9	Fragments		Landmark Trust	Only gatehouse and a section of wall remain.
Norham Castle	Keep and bailey	12th century	Ruins			Keep remodelled in 1422–25, partly rebuilt in 1513–15.
Preston Tower, Ellingham	Pele tower	c. 1400	Fragment			South wall remains, with two of the original four turrets.
Prior Castell's Tower	Tower house	15–16th century	Substantially intact			On the island of Inner Farne.
Prudhoe Castle	Castle	12–14th century	Ruins			
Shilbottle Tower	Pele tower	15th century	Restored		Private	Incorporated into a vicarage.
Shortflatt Tower	Pele tower	14–15th century	Restored		Wedding venue	Incorporated in later house.
Thirlwall Castle	Tower house	14th century	Fragmentary ruins		Northumberland National Park	Built with stone from Hadrian's Wall.
Warkworth Castle	Keep and bailey	12–14th century	Ruins			
Whittingham Tower	Pele tower	13–14th century	Restored		Private	Converted for use as almshouses in 1845.
Whitton Tower	Pele tower	c. 1386	Intact		Holiday accommodation	Near Rothbury, well-preserved.
Willimoteswick Castle	Fortified manor house	16th century	Ruins		Private, farm	Incorporates remains of earlier building, largely rebuilt in 1900.

== North Yorkshire ==
Castles of which little remains include:

- Acklam Motte
- Burton in Lonsdale Castle
- Buttercrambe Castle
- Carlton Castle
- Castle Levington
- Duffield Castle
- Guisborough Castle
- Harsley Castle
- Henderskelfe Castle
- Howe Hill (Yafforth)
- Hunmanby Castle
- Killerby Castle
- Kilton Castle
- Kirkby Fleetham Castle
- Kyme Castle
- Lythe Castle
- Malton Castle
- Saxton Castle
- Sigston Castle
- Slingsby Castle
- Tadcaster Castle
- Topcliffe Castle
- Upsall Castle

Name	Type	Date	Condition	Image	Ownership / Access	Notes
Ayton Castle	Castle	13–14th century	Fragment		Local authority	
Barden Tower	Castle	15th century	Ruins			
Bolton Castle	Quadrangular castle	14th century	Ruins			Besieged and slighted during English Civil War.
Cawood Castle	Quadrangular castle	1374–88	Fragments		Landmark Trust	Largely demolished in 1750, gatehouse survives.
Clifford's Tower	Keep	13th century	Restored			Reduced in height 1596.
Crayke Castle	Tower house	15th century	Restored		Private	18th- and 19th-century additions and alterations.
Danby Castle	Quadrangular castle	14th century	Fragmentary ruins		Private, farm	Partly used as farm buildings.
Gilling Castle	Tower house	14th century	Intact		St. Martin's Ampleforth School	16th- and 18th-century additions and alterations.
Hazlewood Castle	Castle	13–18th century	Rebuilt		Hotel	Altered in the 18th and 20th centuries, formerly Carmelite retreat centre.
Hellifield Peel	Tower house	14–15th century	Restored		Hotel	Restored 2005.
Helmsley Castle	Castle	12–13th century	Ruins			Severely slighted in 1645.
Hornby Castle	Courtyard castle	14–15th century	Restored		Private	Converted to country house by John Carr, 18th century.
Knaresborough Castle	Keep and bailey	12–14th century	Fragmentary ruins		Duchy of Lancaster	
Marmion Tower	Fortified manor house	15th century	Fragment			Surviving gatehouse of Tanfield Castle.
Middleham Castle	Keep and bailey	12–14th century	Ruins			
(Old) Mulgrave Castle	Enclosure castle	12–13th century	Fragmentary ruins		Marquess of Normanby	Superseded by 18–19th-century castellated mansion also known as Mulgrave Castle.
Nappa Hall	Fortified manor house	1459	Intact		Private	Enlarged in the 17th century, little altered since.
Pickering Castle	Keep and bailey	12–14th century	Ruins			
Ravensworth Castle	Castle	14th century	Fragmentary remains		Private	
Richmond Castle	Keep and bailey	11–14th century	Ruins			Keep 100 ft (30 m) high.
Ripley Castle	Tower house	15–16th century	Rebuilt			Extended in 1783–36 in Gothic Revival style.
Scarborough Castle	Keep and bailey	12–13th century	Ruins			
Sheriff Hutton Castle	Quadrangular castle	1382	Fragmentary ruins		Private	
Skelton Castle	Castellated house	13–19th century	Intact		Private	18–19th-century house incorporates remains of medieval castle.
Skipton Castle	Castle	12–17th century	Restored			Partly demolished in 1649, rebuilt in 1657–58.
Snape Castle	Castle	15–18th century	Partly ruined		Private	Mostly reconstructed in the 17th century.
South Cowton Castle	Tower house	15th century	Restored		Private	Altered in the 19th century, farmhouse.
Spofforth Castle	Fortified manor house	13–15th century	Fragmentary ruins			
Whorlton Castle	Castle	14–16th century	Fragmentary ruins			Remains of gatehouse.
Wilton Castle	Neo-romantic castle	c. 1810	Intact		Private apartments	By Smirke on site of medieval castle.

== Nottinghamshire ==
Castles of which little remains include:

- Annesley Castle
- Aslockton Castle
- Bothamsall Castle
- Cuckney Castle
- Egmanton Castle
- Greasley Castle
- Laxton Castle
- Lowdham Castle
- Worksop Castle

Name	Type	Date	Condition	Image	Ownership / Access	Notes
Halloughton Manor House	Pele tower	14th century	Intact		Private	Attached to later building.
Newark Castle	Castle	12–14th century	Ruins		/ Newark District Council	Gatehouse, part of curtain wall and a tower remain.
Nottingham Castle	Keep and bailey	12–13th century	Fragmentary remains		Nottingham City Council	Demolished in 1651, later mansion on site, a much-restored 14th-century gatehouse remains.

== Oxfordshire ==
Castles of which little or nothing remains include:

- Ardley Castle
- Ascot d'Oilly Castle
- Ascott Earl Castle
- Banbury Castle
- Beaumont Castle
- Brightwell Castle
- Chipping Norton Castle
- Deddington Castle
- Faringdon Castle
- FitzHarris Castle
- Hinton Waldrist Castle
- Leafield Castle
- Radcot Castle
- South Moreton Castle
- Swerford Castle

Name	Type	Date	Condition	Image	Ownership / Access	Notes
Bampton Castle	Quadrangular castle	c. 1315	Fragment		Private	Parts of gatehouse and curtain wall survive in later house, Ham Court.
Broughton Castle	Fortified manor house	14–15th century	Intact			Remodelled in the 15–18th centuries.
Hanwell Castle	Castellated house	15–16th century	Fragment		Private	Large surviving tower of unfortified building.
Oxford Castle	Motte and bailey	11–12th century	Fragment		Hotel	Motte and the unusual, possibly Saxon, St. George's Tower.
Rotherfield Greys Castle	Fortified manor house	14th century	Fragment			Towers and section of wall survive, close to Greys Court.
Shirburn Castle	Quadrangular castle	c. 1378	Rebuilt		Private	Originally stone, largely rebuilt in brick c. 1720, remodelled in the 19th century.
Wallingford Castle	Motte and bailey	11–13th century	Fragmentary remains			Slighted in 1652, impressive earthworks remain.

== Rutland ==
Castles of which little or nothing remains include:

- Burley Castle
- Essendine Castle
- Uppingham Castle
- Woodhead Castle

Name	Type	Date	Condition	Image	Ownership / Access	Notes
Oakham Castle	Motte and bailey	12–13th century	Fragment		/ Rutland County Council	Aisled great hall built in 1180–1190 survives.

== Shropshire ==
Castles of which only earthworks or vestiges remain include:

- Apley Castle
- Belan Bank (Kinnerley)
- Buckhurst Castle
- Bucknell Castle
- Castle Bank
- Caus Castle
- Charlton Castle
- Cleobury Castle
- Clungunford Castle
- Colebatch Castle
- Corfham Castle
- Ellesmere Castle
- Fordhall castle
- Hodnet Castle
- Holdgate Castle
- Knockin Castle
- Lea Castle
- Little Ness Castle
- Middlehope Castle
- Minton Castle
- Myddle Castle
- Oswestry Castle
- Panpudding Hill
- Pulverbatch Castle
- Rushbury Castle
- Ruyton-XI-Towns Castle
- Shrawardine Castle
- Stapleton Castle
- Wem Castle
- Soulton Castle
- The Beacon (Bretchel)
- Tong Castle
- Tyrley Castle
- West Felton Castle
- Wilcott Castle
- Wollaston Castle
- Yockleton Castle

Name	Type	Date	Condition	Image	Ownership / Access	Notes
Acton Burnell Castle	Fortified manor house	13th century	Ruins			Shell, used as a barn in the 18th century.
Alberbury Castle	Chamber block	13th century	Fragmentary remains			
Bishop's Castle	Motte and bailey	12th-13th century	Fragments		Castle Hotel	Mound and wall fragments in hotel grounds.
Bridgnorth Castle	Keep and bailey	12th century	Fragmentary remains			Slighted in 1645.
Broncroft Castle	Fortified manor house	14th century	Intact		Private	Renovated in the 19th century.
Bryn Amlwg Castle	Ringwork	13th century	Fragments		Private farmland	Fragments of 13th-century stone castle visible among earthworks.
Cheney Longville Castle	Fortified manor house	14–17th century	Part habitable		Private	Building at Risk.
Clun Castle	Keep and bailey	13th century	Fragmentary remains			Ruins of keep built onto side of motte.
Hopton Castle	Keep and bailey	14th century	Ruins			Burnt in the Civil War; restored in 2006-11.
Ludlow Castle	Keep and bailey	11–14th century	Ruins		Earl of Powis	One of the great Welsh border castles.
Moreton Corbet Castle	Keep	12th century	Fragmentary remains			Adjoining ruins of a 16th-century building.
Quatford Castle	Neo-romantic castle	c. 1830	Intact		Private	Nearby are earthwork remains of the medieval Quatford Castle.
Red Castle	Castle	13th century	Fragmentary remains.			Overgrown, feature of Hawkstone Park landscape garden. Building at Risk.
Rowton Castle	Sham castle	18–19th century	Intact		Hotel	On site of medieval castle, remodelled in 1809–12 by George Wyatt.
Shrewsbury Castle	Castle	12th century	Rebuilt		Shropshire Council	Restored and extended in 1642, altered c. 1790 by Telford.
Stokesay Castle	Fortified manor house	13–14th century	Intact			Restored in the 19th century.
Wattlesborough Castle	Castle	13–14th century	Fragment		Private	Near Rowton, keep/tower survives, adjoining Wattlesborough Hall.
Whittington Castle	Keep and bailey	12–13th century	Fragments		Local community	Gatehouse towers survive.

== Somerset ==
Castles of which only earthworks or no traces remain include:

- Ballands Castle
- Bridgwater Castle
- Bury Castle
- Cary Castle
- Castle Batch (Worle)
- Castle Neroche
- Cockroad Wood Castle
- Crewkerne Castle
- Culverhay Castle
- Fenny Castle
- Montacute Castle
- Richmont Castle
- Stowey Castle

Name	Type	Date	Condition	Image	Ownership / Access	Notes
Beckington Castle		17th century	Rebuilt		Company HQ	Medieval remains incorporated in later building.
Dunster Castle	Castle	13–19th century	Rebuilt			Existing house dates largely from c. 1571, with 18–19th-century alterations.
Farleigh Hungerford Castle	Enclosure castle	14–15th century	Ruins			On high ground above the River Frome.
Newton St Loe Castle	Fortified manor house	14th century	Fragment		Bath Spa University	Large tower and gatehouse, altered in the 16–17th century.
Nunney Castle	Tower house	1373	Ruins			Towers originally had conical roofs, north wall collapsed in 1910.
Stogursey Castle	Ringwork	11–12th century	Fragmentary remains		Landmark Trust	17th-century house built within the remains of the castle.
Sutton Court	Fortified manor house	14–15th century	Fragment		Private apartments	Short length of embattled wall and a tower survive, incorporated in large house, restored in the 19th century.
Taunton Castle	Keep and bailey	12th-13th century	Restored			Now houses the Museum of Somerset, Castle Hotel incorporates remains of an outer gatehouse.
Walton Castle	Sham castle	1615–20	Restored		Private	Restored as private house 20th century.
Wells Bishop's Palace	Fortified palace	13–15th century	Substantially intact		Church of England	Adjacent to cathedral, residence of the Bishop of Bath and Wells.

== South Yorkshire ==
Castles of which only earthworks, fragments or nothing remains include:

- Bradfield Castle (Bailey Hill)
- Doncaster Castle
- Hangthwaite Castle
- Kimberworth Castle
- Laughton Castle
- Mexborough Castle
- Sheffield Castle
- Manor Castle
- Thorne Castle

Name	Type	Date	Condition	Image	Ownership / Access	Notes
Conisbrough Castle	Keep and bailey	12th century	Ruins			Cylindrical keep, castle ruinous before English Civil War, so escaped slighting.
Tickhill Castle	Motte and bailey	11–14th century	Fragmentary remains		Duchy of Lancaster	Ruined gatehouse and parts of curtain walls remain.

== Staffordshire ==
Castles of which little or nothing remains include:

- Audley Castle
- Chesterton Castle
- Heighley Castle
- Lichfield Castle
- Newcastle-under-Lyme Castle

Name	Type	Date	Condition	Image	Ownership / Access	Notes
Alton Castle	Castle	12–13th century	Fragmentary remains		Youth centre	Cliff-top position, site partly occupied by a 19th-century building.
Caverswall Castle	Enclosure castle	c. 1275	Substantially intact		Private	Moated, walls and towers reduced in height, a 17th-century mansion built within.
Chartley Castle	Motte and bailey	11–13th century	Fragmentary remains		Private	Altered in the 13th century to form enclosure castle, abandoned by 1485.
Eccleshall Castle	Castle	14th century	Fragmentary remains		Private	Remains partly incorporated into house of c. 1695, rebuilt in the 19th century.
Stafford Castle	Motte and bailey	11–12th century	Earthworks		/ Stafford Borough Council	Medieval keep partly rebuilt in the 19th century, then partly demolished.
Stourton Castle	Castle	14–15th century	Fragment		Private	Remains incorporated in later buildings.
Tamworth Castle	Shell keep	11–13th century	Rebuilt		Local authority	Largely rebuilt in the 16–18th centuries.
Tutbury Castle	Motte and bailey	12–15th century	Fragmentary ruins			Slighted in 1647–48, a 19th-century folly stands on the motte.

== Suffolk ==
Castles of which only earthworks or no traces remain include:

- Denham Castle
- Freckenham Castle
- Great Ashfield Castle
- Haughley Castle
- Ipswich Castle
- Lidgate Castle
- Milden Castle

Name	Type	Date	Condition	Image	Ownership / Access	Notes
Bungay Castle	Keep and bailey	12–13th century	Fragmentary remains		/ Bungay Castle Trust	Abandoned c. 1365.
Clare Castle	Motte and bailey	11th century	Fragmentary remains			Motte 53 ft (16 m) high.
Eye Castle	Motte and bailey	11th century	Fragmentary remains			Motte over 40 ft (12 m) high.
Framlingham Castle	Enclosure castle	12th century	Ruins			Used as a poor house in the 17–19th centuries.
Mettingham Castle	Fortified manor house	c. 1342	Fragmentary remains		Private	Gatehouse survives.
Orford Castle	Keep	1165–73	Ruins			Unique polygonal keep survives.
Wingfield Castle	Castle	c. 1385	Fragment		Private	South curtain wall, gatehouse and east drawbridge survive, with a 16–17th-century house.

== Surrey ==
Castles of which only little or no traces remain include:

- Abinger Castle
- Betchworth Castle
- Bletchingley Castle
- Cranleigh Castle (Broomhall Copse)
- Reigate Castle
- Starborough Castle
- Thunderfield Castle
- Walton-on-the-Hill Castle

Name	Type	Date	Condition	Image	Ownership / Access	Notes
Farnham Castle	Keep and bailey	12th century	Substantially intact			Shell keep replaced earlier keep part buried, part remodelled in the 17th century.
Guildford Castle	Keep and bailey	12–13th century	Ruins		Local authority	Tower keep survives, roofless since c. 17th century.

== Tyne and Wear ==
Castles of which little remains include:

- Burradon Tower
- Heaton Castle

Name	Type	Date	Condition	Image	Ownership / Access	Notes
Hylton Castle	Tower house	c. 1400	Ruins			Large gatehouse tower, incorporated into an 18th-century house, since demolished.
Newcastle Castle	Keep and bailey	1172–77	Restored		/ Newcastle City Council	Keep and gatehouse survive.
Old Hollinside	Fortified manor house	13th century	Ruins			On slope overlooking River Derwent.
Ravensworth Castle	Quadrangular castle	14–19th century	Ruins		Private	Two towers of medieval castle survive, amidst ruins of later building. Building at Risk.
Tynemouth Castle	Enclosure castle	13–14th century	Ruins			Built to enclose and protect the priory, modified as artillery castle 16th century.

== Warwickshire ==
Castles of which only earthworks or vestiges remain include:

- Baginton Castle
- Beaudesert Castle
- Brailes Castle
- Brandon Castle
- Brinklow Castle
- Caludon Castle
- Fillongley Castle
- Hartshill Castle
- Halford Castle
- King John's Castle
- Kingsbury Hall
- Ratley Castle
- Seckington Castle
- Studley Old Castle

Name	Type	Date	Condition	Image	Ownership / Access	Notes
Astley Castle	Fortified manor house	13–14th century	Shell		Landmark Trust	Altered 15–19th centuries, hotel prior to fire in 1978. Modern living space constructed within shell, winner of Stirling Prize 2013.
Kenilworth Castle	Keep and bailey	12–14th century	Ruins			Altered in the 16th century, slighted in 1650.
Maxstoke Castle	Quadrangular castle	14–15th century	Substantially intact		NGS	Moated, domestic buildings of 15–19th centuries within curtain walls.
Warwick Castle	Castle	13–15th century	Intact			Guy's tower rises 128 ft (39 m), 17th-century residential block, remodelled by Anthony Salvin after fire.

== West Midlands ==
Castles of which little or no traces remain include:

- Allesley Castle
- Bescot Castle
- Bromwich Castle
- Caludon Castle
- Coventry Castle
- Darlaston Castle
- Hobs Moat
- Walsall Castle
- Wednesbury Castle
- Weoley Castle

Name	Type	Date	Condition	Image	Ownership / Access	Notes
Dudley Castle	Keep and bailey	1070-71	Ruins		Dudley Zoo	Slighted in 1647, then rebuilt and inhabited until destroyed by fire in 1750, partly restored in the 19th century.

== West Sussex ==
Castles of which only little or no traces remain include:

- Chichester Castle
- Midhurst Castle
- Pulborough Castle
- Sedgwick Castle

Name	Type	Date	Condition	Image	Ownership / Access	Notes
Amberley Castle	Castle	1377–82	Partly habitable		Hotel	Remodelled in the 16th century and later, incorporates a 12th-century manor, working portcullis.
Arundel Castle	Keep and bailey	12–13th century	Heavily restored		Duke of Norfolk	Remodelled in 1791–1815 and 1890–1903.
Bramber Castle	Keep and bailey	11–12th century	Fragmentary remains			Commanding position, earthworks and fragment of wall remain.
Halnaker House	Fortified manor house	13–14th century	Ruins		Private	Altered in the 18th century, fell into ruin 1880s, replaced by later house of same name.
(Old) Knepp Castle	Keep and motte	1214	Ruins		Private	11th century motte, with keep added in 1214. Mostly demolished in 1726.

== West Yorkshire ==
Castles of which only earthworks or no traces remain include:

- Almondbury Castle
- Bardsey Castle
- Barwick-in-Elmet Castle
- Sowerby Castle
- Wakefield Castle
- Wetherby Castle

Name	Type	Date	Condition	Image	Ownership / Access	Notes
Harewood Castle	Tower house	14th century	Ruins		Private	Shell of tower, substantially intact, within Harewood House estate.
Pontefract Castle	Motte and bailey	12–15th century	Fragmentary remains		Local authority	Royal castle, withstood three sieges during English Civil War, afterwards dismantled.
Sandal Castle	Motte and bailey	12th-13th century	Fragmentary remains			Well-preserved earthworks, excavated site with visitor centre.

== Wiltshire ==
Castles of which only little or no traces remain include:

- Ashton Keynes Castle
- Bincknoll Castle
- Castle Combe Castle
- Castle Orchard
- Lewisham Castle
- Malmesbury Castle
- Marlborough Castle
- Mere Castle
- Norwood Castle
- Sherrington Castle
- Stapleford Castle

Name	Type	Date	Condition	Image	Ownership / Access	Notes
Devizes Castle	Neo-romantic castle	19th century	Intact		Private apartments	Present building begun 1842 on site of important medieval castle built in 1080.
Longford Castle	Sham castle	1591	Intact		Earl of Radnor	Remodelled in the 18th century.
Ludgershall Castle	Ringwork	11–13th century	Fragmentary remains			Remains of a tower and extensive earthworks.
Old Sarum Castle	Motte and bailey	11–13th century	Fragmentary remains			On site of Iron Age hill fort.
Old Wardour Castle	Castle	c. 1393	Ruins			Remodelled in the 16–17th centuries, superseded by Palladian building known as New Wardour Castle.

== Worcestershire ==
Castles of which only earthworks remain include:

- Castlemorton Castle
- Elmley Castle
- Hanley Castle
- Homme Castle
- Inkberrow Castle
- Leigh Castle
- Tenbury Wells Castle

Name	Type	Date	Condition	Image	Ownership / Access	Notes
Caldwall Castle	Fortified manor house	15–16th century	Fragment		Private	Single surviving tower, in Kidderminster, Caldwall or Caldwell.
Hartlebury Castle	Fortified manor house	15th century	Rebuilt		Church of England	15th-century remains incorporated in later buildings, residence of Bishop of Worcester until 2007, houses Worcestershire County Museum.
Holt Castle	Castle	14–19th century	Intact		Wedding venue	Medieval tower incorporated in later buildings.
Worcester Castle	Castle	13–14th century	Fragment		Church of England	Edgar Tower, now the entrance to College Green, may incorporate the remains of a castle gatehouse.

== See also ==
- Maps of castles in England by county
- Military history of the United Kingdom
- Castles in Great Britain and Ireland
- List of castles in Ireland
- Castles in Scotland
- Castles in the Isle of Man
- List of castles in Wales
- List of castles

== Bibliography ==
- Blair, John (1998) Anglo-Saxon Oxfordshire London: Sutton. ISBN 978-0-7509-1750-6.
- Brown, R. Allen (1962) English Castles London: Batsford. ISBN 978-0-907486-06-0.
- Creighton, Oliver (2002) Castles and Landscapes London: Continuum. ISBN 978-0-8264-5896-4.
- Elton, Geoffrey R. (1991) England Under the Tudors London: Routledge. ISBN 978-0-415-06533-7.
- Emery, Anthony (1996) Greater Medieval Houses of England and Wales, 1300-1500: Volume 1, Northern England Cambridge: Cambridge University Press. ISBN 978-0-521-49723-7
- Harrington, Peter (2007) The Castles of Henry VIII Oxford: Osprey. ISBN 978-1-84603-130-4.
- Higham, Robert (1988), "Devon castles: An annotated list", Proceedings of the Devon Archaeological Society, 35: 142–149
- Higham, Robert; Barker, Philip (1992) Timber Castles London: Batsford. ISBN 978-0-7134-2189-7.
- Impey, Edward; Parnell, Geoffrey (2000) The Tower of London: The Official Illustrated History Merrell Publishers in association with Historic Royal Palaces. ISBN 978-1-85894-106-6.
- King, D.J. Cathcart (1983) Castellarium Anglicanum: An Index and Bibliography of the Castles in England, Wales and the Islands London: Kraus International Publications ISBN 978-0-527-50110-5.
- King, D.J. Cathcart (1988) The Castle in England and Wales: An Interpretative History London: Croom Helm. ISBN 978-0-918400-08-6.
- Renn, Derek (1984), "Review: Castellarium Anglicanum by D.J. Cathcart King" (PDF), Medieval Archaeology, 28: 277–278
- Thompson, Michael (1987) The Decline of the Castle Cambridge: Cambridge University Press. ISBN 978-0-521-32194-5.
