= Denham Castle =

Castle in Suffolk, England

- Gazeley, Suffolk, England
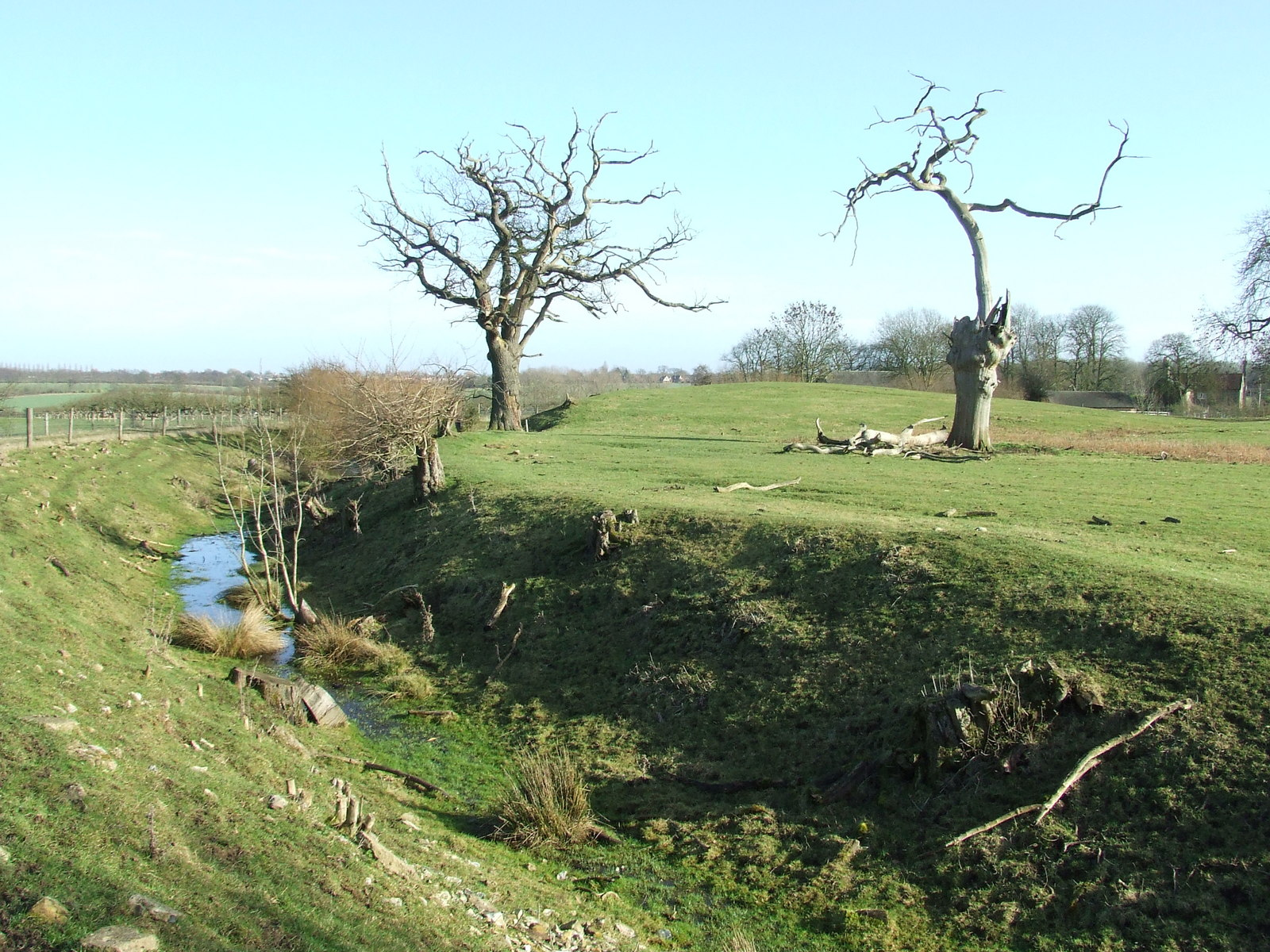
- Earthwork remains of Denham Castle

Site information
- Type: Motte and bailey
- Owner: The Denham Estate
- Open to the public: No, but closely viewable from public path
- Condition: Earthworks remain

Location
- Shown within Suffolk
- Coordinates: 52.2357°N 0.5569°E
- Grid reference: grid reference TL747628

Site history
- Materials: Earth and timber

Denham Castle, also known as Castle Holes, is a medieval motte and bailey castle near the village of Gazeley, Suffolk, England. The castle was also known as Desning Castle at the time of building and occupation.

== History ==
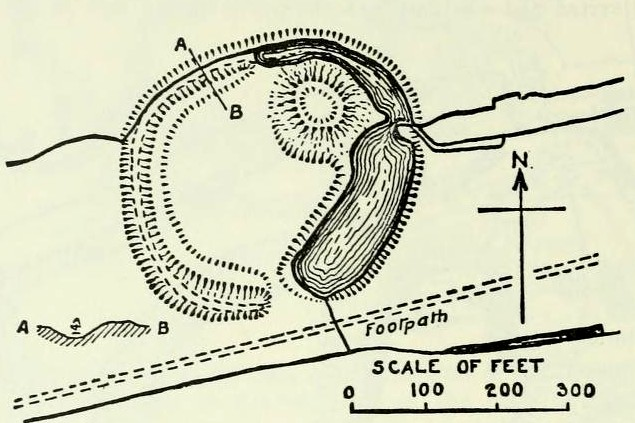
Plan and cross-section of Denham Castle in 1911

Denham Castle was a 12th-century Norman castle, built in a motte and bailey design with the motte (man-made hill), now 10 feet high, located in the north-east corner. The motte and the bailey (courtyard) are contained within a wide ditch, 132 m by 122 m across. The entrance to the castle was on the south side.

The castle is thought to have been at its greatest importance during the civil wars that arose after Stephen of Blois (1097-1154) took the throne instead of Matilda, Henry I's daughter. Later, Stephen adopted Matilda's son, Henry, as his heir but it was Stephen's death in 1154 that brought about the demise of Desning Castle. The newly crowned Henry II decided to strip many of the leading Suffolk nobles of their castles as a result of their support for Stephen. As a result it is thought that Desning Castle was slighted, retaining the hall and other buildings within the bailey. Thus the site was occupied until the 14th century when the Black Death is thought to have caused the site to be evacuated, with the owner occupants moving about a mile West to the site of Desning Hall (which itself was totally demolished in the 1980s. Today the castle is a scheduled monument. Despite previous damage to the castle remains from modern agriculture, the current owners, the Denham Estate, have announced that they are working with English Heritage to restore and maintain the site.

== See also ==
- Castles in Great Britain and Ireland
- List of castles in England

== Bibliography ==
- Page, William. (ed) (1911) The Victoria History of Suffolk, Vol. 1. London: University of London.
- Wall, J. C. (1911) "Ancient Earthworks," in Page (ed) (1911).
