= Stow Green, St Briavels =

Coordinates: 51°45′18″N 2°37′56″W

Stow Green Castle, also known as Castle Tump, was a castle near the village of St Briavels in Gloucestershire, England.

The castle is believed to have been built after the Norman Conquest. The castle was a small circular ring-motte fortification, once measuring 35 yards across, now only 25 yards, with a high motte, or mound, in the middle and a protective ditch around it. The entrance to the castle was on the south side of the fortification. The castle would have defended the Stowe valley, and was probably a precursor to the later St Briavels Castle in the same area.

== See also ==
- Castles in Great Britain and Ireland
- List of castles in England

== Bibliography ==
- Witts, G. B. (2008) Archaeological Handbook of the County of Gloucester. Read Books.
