= Cotherstone Castle =

Castle in Durham, England

- County Durham, England, UK

Location
- Location in County Durham
- Coordinates: 54.575°N 1.978°W
- Grid reference: NZ015200

Cotherstone Castle was in the village of Cotherstone by the River Tees some 3 miles (5 km) north-east of Barnard Castle in County Durham, England.

This was a motte and bailey castle built around 1090. In 1200 the wooden building was replaced by a stone building, of which was licensed on 2 March 1201. The remains include an earth mound, a ruined wall fragment and traces of a probable fishpond.

There is no public right of way onto the land the Castle occupied, which is now used for pasture.

== See also ==
- Castles in Great Britain and Ireland
- List of castles in England
