= South Moreton Castle =

Motte and ditch garrisoning South Moreton ford

- South Moreton, Oxfordshire, England

Site information
- Type: Motte and bailey
- Condition: Earthworks remain

Location
- Shown within Oxfordshire
- Coordinates: 51.5884°N 1.1966°W

South Moreton Castle was an 11th-century castle in the village of South Moreton, Oxfordshire, (historically in Berkshire until the 1974 reorganisation), England. The name can also refer to a nearby siege-castle, probably from the 12th century.

== History ==
South Moreton Castle is an 11th-century Norman motte and bailey design that overlooks Mill Brook in the village of South Moreton, lying close to the village church. The motte is 50 metres (160 ft) wide and 4 metres (13 ft) high, surrounded by a 15-metre-wide (49 ft) ditch that may have originally been filled with water. and is partly filled most winters. The motte was damaged during the late Victorian period, and a 50-yard-long (46 m) embankment stretching away from the castle to the west may have been destroyed around that time. Local tradition states that some victims of the English Civil War in the 17th century were buried upon the motte. The castle is a scheduled monument.

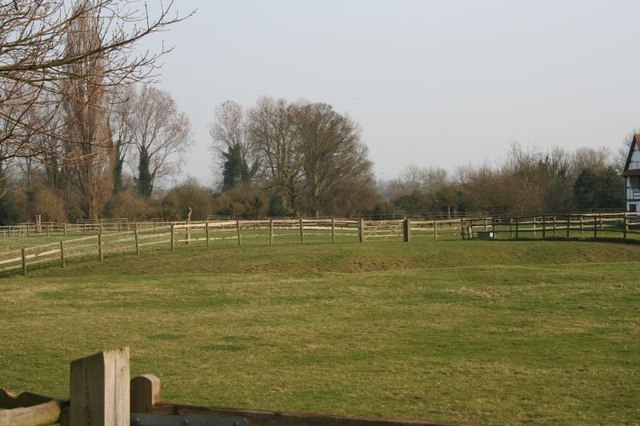
The siege work

600 metres to the north of the main South Moreton Castle, by the Saundreville manor house and the railway line, is another fortification, possibly dating from the civil war of the Anarchy in the 12th century. These fortifications includes a moated ditch 85 metres (279 ft) by 130 metres (430 ft) across, and could be a siege-castle designed to contain the forces of the Empress Matilda at Wallingford three miles away An alternative opinion is that this moat was in fact associated with the nearby manor house, and that the siege castle referred to in the 1140s was in fact the old castle overlooking Mill Brook.

== See also ==
- Castles in Great Britain and Ireland
- List of castles in England

== Bibliography ==
- Betts, W.J. (1910) "South Moreton," Berkshire, Buckinghamshire and Oxfordshire Archaeological Journal Vol. 15, p. 73.
- Spurrell, M. (1995) "Containing Wallingford Castle, 1146-53.", Oxoniensia 60, pp257–270.
