= Ipswich Castle =

- Ipswich, Suffolk, England

Site information
- Condition: Destroyed

Location
- Shown within Suffolk
- Coordinates: 52.0584°N 1.1566°E
- Grid reference: grid reference TM165447

Ipswich Castle was a medieval castle, now vanished, in the town of Ipswich, Suffolk, England.

== History ==
Ipswich Castle was built after the Norman conquest of England in the town of Ipswich; the exact location is uncertain, with the modern-day Ipswich arboretum or the mount near St Stephen's church being two possibilities.

By the 12th century the Bigod family had come to dominate Suffolk, holding the title of the Earl of Norfolk and owning the four major castles of Framlingham, Bungay, Walton and Thetford. Tensions persisted throughout the period, however, between the Crown and the Bigods. Hugh Bigod was one of a group of dissenting barons during the Anarchy in the reign of King Stephen, and controlled Ipswich Castle. At the end of the conflict, Stephen struck into Hugh's territory and took the town and the castle in 1153.

After coming to power Henry II attempted to re-establish royal influence across the region, by when Hugh had regained control of Ipswich Castle. As part of this effort, Henry confiscated the main Bigod castles from Hugh in 1157; his efforts to control Hugh failed, and the baron joined the revolt by Henry's sons in 1173. The attempt to overthrow Henry was unsuccessful, and in 1176 Henry ordered Ipswich Castle destroyed as part of his punishment of the Bigods. The castle was not rebuilt and nothing remains of it today.

== See also ==
- Castles in Great Britain and Ireland
- List of castles in England

== Bibliography ==
- Bradbury, Jim. (2009) Stephen and Matilda: the Civil War of 1139–53. Stroud, UK: The History Press. ISBN 978-0-7509-3793-1.
- Brown, R. Allen. (1962) English Castles. London: Batsford. OCLC 1392314.
- Drage, C. (1987) "Urban castles," in Schofield and Leech (eds) (1987).
- MacKenzie, James Dixon. (1896/2009) The Castles of England: Their Story and Structure. General Books LLC. ISBN 978-1-150-51044-1.
- Pounds, Norman John Greville. (1994) The Medieval Castle in England and Wales: a social and political history. Cambridge: Cambridge University Press. ISBN 978-0-521-45828-3.
- Schofield, J. and R. Leech. (eds) Urban Archaeology in Britain. CBA Research Report 61.
