= Bourn Castle =

Coordinates: 52.18821°N 0.06757°W

Bourn Castle was in the village of Bourn in Cambridgeshire, 10 miles to the west of Cambridge (grid reference TL322562).

It originally consisted of wooden buildings on an earthwork enclosure which was erected by Picot of Cambridge around 1080, which was towards the end of the reign of William the Conqueror. This was burnt down during the reign of Henry III, c.1266. In the early 16th century Bourn Hall was built on part of the site.

== See also ==
- Castles in Great Britain and Ireland
- List of castles in England
