= Castle Tump, Dymock =

Castle in Gloucestershire, England

Coordinates: 51°57′42″N 2°25′16″W

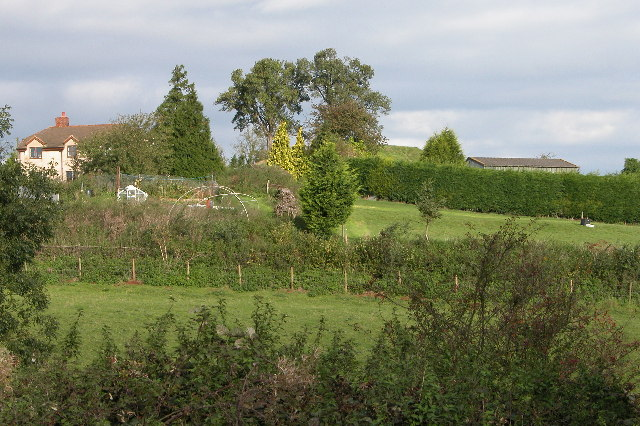
Castle Tump today

Castle Tump was a castle in the village of Dymock in Gloucestershire, England.

The castle was built in either the 11th or more probably the early 12th century as a motte and bailey design. The motte today is 14 m high, with the traces of the bailey to the south-east.

During the Anarchy the castle was given to William de Braose, the son-in-law of the powerful Miles de Gloucester. After the conflict the castle is believed to have probably been destroyed by Henry II as part of a wider programme of castle denigration in Gloucestershire during the 1150s.

== See also ==
- Castles in Great Britain and Ireland
- List of castles in England

== Bibliography ==
- Amt, Emilie. (1993) The Accession of Henry II in England: royal government restored, 1149-1159. Woodbridge, UK: Boydell Press. ISBN 978-0-85115-348-3.
- Fry, Plantagenet Somerset. (2005) Castles: England, Scotland, Wales, Ireland: the definitive guide to the most impressive buildings and intriguing sites. Cincinnati: David and Charles. ISBN 978-0-7153-2212-3.
- Renn, Derek Frank. (1968) Norman castles in Britain. London: Baker.
