= Allesley Castle =

Former castle in the West Midlands, England

- West Midlands, England
- The concrete-capped well situated on the site's earthworks

Site information
- Type: Castle
- Open to the public: Yes
- Condition: Earthworks

Location
- Shown within the West Midlands.
- Location within West Midlands county
- Coordinates: 52.4245°N 1.5665°W
- Grid reference: SP 29906 80049

Allesley Castle is a former motte and bailey castle in Allesley, Coventry. The mound has never been excavated. All that remains of the castle is a large mound - the motte - and a defensive ditch approximately 45 metres (148 ft) in diameter. The ditch contains several concrete blocks which are thought to be bases for bridges over the motte. The site is a scheduled historical monument.

== History ==
There is little documentary evidence for the history of the castle. It was possibly built as early as the 11th century or around 1140 (during the Anarchy) and it was probably ruined by 1387, but there is speculation that it may have been built in the 14th century by Lord Hastings, who built another fortification in Fillongley, seven miles away. It was seized from the estate of Robert Fitch in 1588 and it was probably in ruins by 1650. English Heritage believe the site contains artefacts which will reveal more about the construction and history of the castle.
