= Newnham Castle =

- Newnham, Kent, England

Location
- Shown within Kent
- Coordinates: 51.2858°N 0.8021°E
- Grid reference: grid reference TQ955578

Newnham Castle was a medieval castle in the village of Newnham, Kent, England.

== History ==
Newnham Castle was built by the Normans, probably by Fulk de Newenham in the mid-12th century during the civil war known as the Anarchy. The castle was located on a scarp to the north of the village and comprised a motte and bailey design. It had a stone keep approximately 6.2 metres (20 ft) by 6.1 metres (20 ft), with 1.8 metres (5 ft 11 in) thick walls, with unusual curved corners. Once built, a mound was piled up around the tower to produce the motte, in a similar fashion to that seen at Farnham.

== See also ==
- Castles in Great Britain and Ireland
- List of castles in England
