= Hampstead Norreys Castle =

Norman castle in Hampstead Norreys, Berkshire, England

- Hampstead Norreys, Berkshire, England
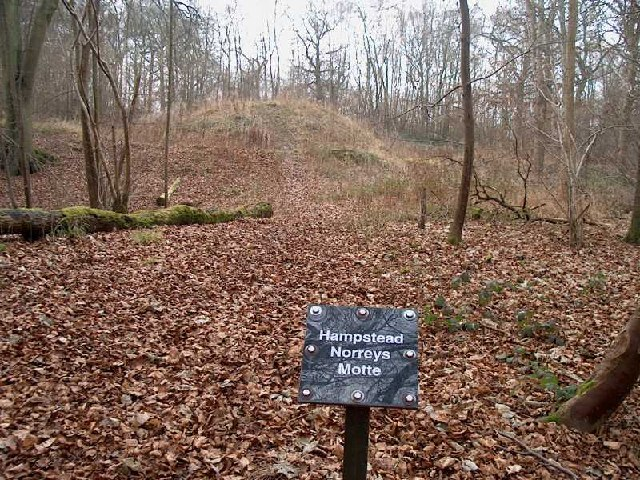
- The motte of Hampstead Norreys Castle

Site information
- Type: Motte and bailey
- Condition: Earthworks

Location
- Shown within Berkshire
- Coordinates: 51.4806°N 1.2398°W
- Grid reference: grid reference SU528760

Hampstead Norreys Castle was a Norman castle in the village of Hampstead Norreys, Berkshire, England.

== History ==
Hampstead Norreys Castle is a Norman motte and bailey castle overlooking the village of Hampstead Norreys, Berkshire, England. The motte is 25 m wide, and 4.2 m high, made of chalk. The contours of the top suggest that a timber tower or defensive structure was built on the motte. The site was originally believed to be a tumulus, until later work confirmed its Norman origins. Local historian David Ford suspects that the castle may have been constructed after the Norman conquest of England by Theodoric the Goldsmith.

Today the castle is surrounded by woodland and is a scheduled monument.

== See also ==
- Castles in Great Britain and Ireland
- List of castles in England

== Bibliography ==
- Grinsell, L.V. (1939) "Berkshire Barrows, Part IV," Berkshire Archaeological Journal 43, pp. 9–21.
- Grinsell, L.V. (1936) "An Analysis and List of Berkshire Barrows," Berkshire Archaeological Journal 40, pp. 20–58.
