= North Elmham Castle =

Grade I listed building in Norfolk, England

- Breckland, Norfolk, England
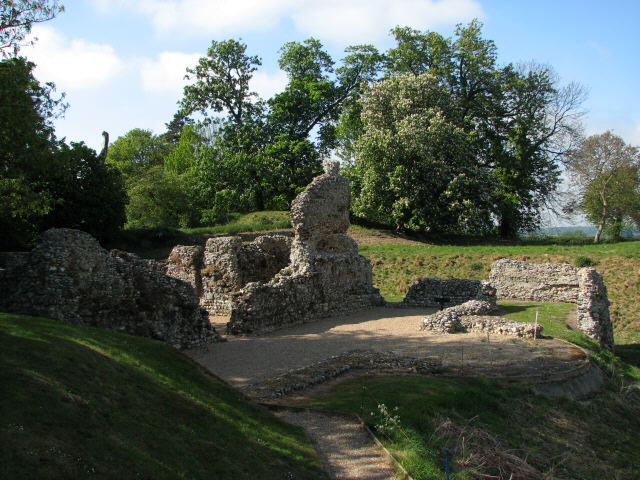
- North Elmham Castle

Site information
- Condition: Only earthworks remain

Location
- Shown within Norfolk
- Coordinates: 52.7554°N 0.9445°E
- Grid reference: grid reference TF988216

North Elmham Castle, also known as North Elmham Bishops Castle and North Elmham Bishops Chapel, is a ruined castle in the village of North Elmham, in the county of Norfolk, England.

== History ==
The castle was built on the site of the Anglo-Saxon cathedral of Elmham in the 11th century. It was the see of Herbert de Losinga, Bishop of Norwich.

On 29 December 1387, Henry le Despenser, Bishop of Norwich, obtained a licence to crenellate the church. He then fortified the structure into a double-moated castle.

The castle fell into disrepair during the 16th century and, by the 19th century, nothing was visible above ground.

== Present ==
English Heritage, which currently stewards the site, excavated it during the 1970s, revealing the earthworks and ruins. Remains of a kitchen hearth, arches, cathedral towers, and walls are all visible. Visitation of the ruins is free and open year-round. The castle is a grade I listed building and a scheduled monument.

== Debate ==
There is debate over some of the ruins at the site. Though it is known for certain that part of the ruins are from the castle and 11th-century church, the building which stood there prior to it is in doubt. It was thought to have been the site of a Saxon cathedral built of stone and flint, and used as the seat of the bishops of East Anglia during the late Anglo-Saxon period until 1075. Architectural historians now believe that though an Anglo-Saxon church made of timber did exist on the site, the stone remains are actually of a Norman chapel built after the Norman invasion.

== See also ==
- Castles in Great Britain and Ireland
- List of castles in England
