= Bromwich Castle =

Coordinates: 52.5059°N 1.7953°W

Bromwich Castle was a motte castle in the large village now called Castle Bromwich in the West Midlands. Bromwich Castle is a scheduled monument.

Bromwich Castle was rebuilt using stone in 1168 by the de Bromwich family.

The site was excavated by Birmingham Museum between 1969 and 1971, revealing evidence of a timber lining to the motte, 12–13th century buildings inside the bailey, and a 16th-century house. Evidence of a Roman settlement was also uncovered. The remains of a motte and bailey castle have been largely destroyed by the construction of the M6 motorway. The location where the castle once stood is now occupied by a roundabout interchange.

== See also ==
- Castles in Great Britain and Ireland
- List of castles in England
