= Old Warden Castle =

Castle in Old Warden, Bedfordshire, England

- Quince Hill
- Old Warden, Bedfordshire, England

Site information
- Type: Castle
- Condition: Earthworks

Location
- Shown within Bedfordshire
- Coordinates: 52.08740°N 0.34244°W
- Grid reference: grid reference TL136445

Old Warden Castle, also known as Quince Hill, is located in the village of Old Warden, in the county of Bedfordshire, England.

It is uncertain whether it is a motte castle or a ringwork.

Roman and Celtic remains have also been located at the site.

Today, only earthworks remain. These are known locally as Quints or Quince Hill. In 1995 the site was classified as a Scheduled Monument.

== See also ==
- Castles in Great Britain and Ireland
- List of castles in England
