= Buckingham Castle =

- Buckinghamshire, England

Site information
- Type: Castle
- Condition: Demolished

Location
- Shown within Buckinghamshire
- Coordinates: 51.9974°N 0.9891°W
- Grid reference: grid reference SP695337

Buckingham Castle was situated in the town of Buckingham, the former county town of Buckinghamshire, on the north side of the River Ouse.

The castle was first mentioned in documentary sources in 1154–64 and was possibly demolished 1208–1215. It was possibly held by the Giffard family. It was levelled in 1777 for the churchyard which now occupies the site, although the outer stone walls remain in place and provide support for the churchyard green. A similar stone wall exists at the rear of castle street, where individual garden plots are supported.

== See also ==
- Castles in Great Britain and Ireland
- List of castles in England
