= Hinton Waldrist Castle =

Castle in England

Coordinates: 51.6895°N 1.4609°W

Hinton Waldrist Castle was in Hinton Waldrist about 7.5 miles (12.1 km) north of Wantage (grid reference SU376991). Hinton Waldrist spent most of its history in Berkshire until in 1974 it was transferred to Oxfordshire.

It was built originally as a motte-and-bailey castle with a moat. The first castle was made of timber by the St. Valory family after the Norman conquest of England. The Bohuns, who were the Earls of Hereford, rebuilt the castle with stone. Mary de Bohun, the first wife of Henry of Bolingbroke, who became King Henry IV, was raised in the castle. Their son, Henry V, visited the castle often in his younger days.

Only earthworks are visible today.
