= Sedgwick Castle =

Castle in Sedgwick, England

Coordinates: 51.02752°N 0.31344°W

Sedgwick Castle is a ruined medieval castle in Nuthurst, West Sussex, England. The castle dates to 1258 AD. The remains consist of wall fragments and earthworks. The site also includes two concentric ditches, ponds, and an outer enclosure. S. E. Winbolt led excavations at the castle in 1923 and 1924. Sedgwick Castle was established as a scheduled monument in 1933.

== Description ==
The ruined medieval castle with a double concentric moat is located on the western edge of Sedgwick Park in Nuthurst, West Sussex. The inner moat is 70.0m in diameter and the outer moat is 140.0m in diameter. There are no structural remains besides ruined sections of mortared, coursed Horsham stone walls, which are in a poor and deteriorating condition. To the west in Rushetts Gill are two large ponds which were constructed in the 13th century.

== History ==
The site was originally a medieval deer park in St Leonard's Forest and was granted to the Le Savage family after the Norman Conquest. The family, who later became known as "Sauvage", used the site as hunting property for two centuries. John Maunsell (d. 1265) later acquired the property and added a keep and outer wall with surrounding moat in 1258. A manor house was added to the complex in 1498. The castle was in continuous use until the early 16th century, when it fell into disrepair. The castle was dismantled and stones from the ruined castle were used in the foundation of Sedgwick Lodge, built in 1600.

Archaeologically investigations were conducted at the site in the mid-19th century and the early 20th century. During the first excavation in 1856, the Rev. Turner investigated the castle remains and produced a layout and description of the site. From 1923 to 1924, S.E. Winbolt excavated the area inside the fortified enclosure and the surrounding moats and later produced a summary on the history of the site and his findings. The site was established as a scheduled monument in 1933.
