= Clent Castle =

Sham ruin folly in Worcestershire, England

Coordinates: 52°24′57″N 2°06′46″W

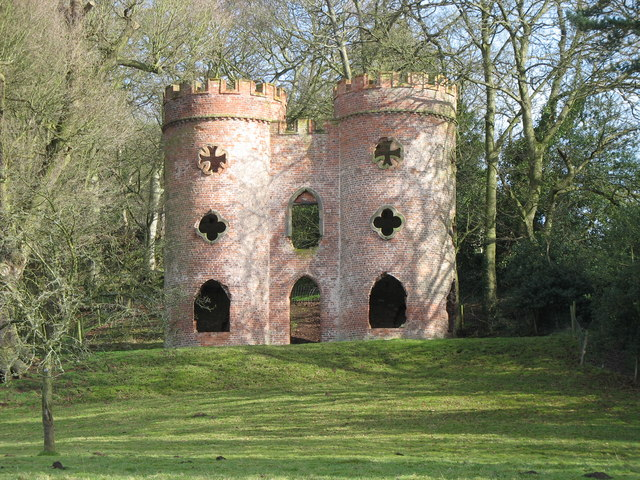
Photograph of Clent Castle by Paul Brooker

Clent Castle is a sham ruin castellated folly in the grounds of Clent Grove (the site of Sunfield Children's Home) that is situated opposite the Fountain Inn on Adams Hill in Clent, Worcestershire, England. It was built in the late 18th century by Thomas Liell, and it has been designated by English Heritage as a Grade II listed building.

English Heritage describes the building thus:

Folly Tower 150 Yards South of Clent Grove

Grade: II
Date Listed: 29 March 1983

Folly tower. Late C18. Handmade brick with stone dressings. Twin round towers linked by lower central section. Three storeys with corbel table and embattled parapets. Window openings have stone architraves. Towers have pointed-arched windows to front and sides, quatrefoil windows at first floor level and windows shaped like Maltese crosses above. Linking section has a pointed archway on the ground floor and a pointed first floor window.

This folly tower appears to have been of similar design to that at Castle Bourne, Bell End, Belbroughton

— English Heritage.

== See also ==
- Hagley Castle, a folly in Hagley Park which is visible from close to the summit of Clent Hill.
