= Desning Hall =

Anglo-Saxon manor house in Suffolk, England

Coordinates: 52.2403°N 0.5400°E

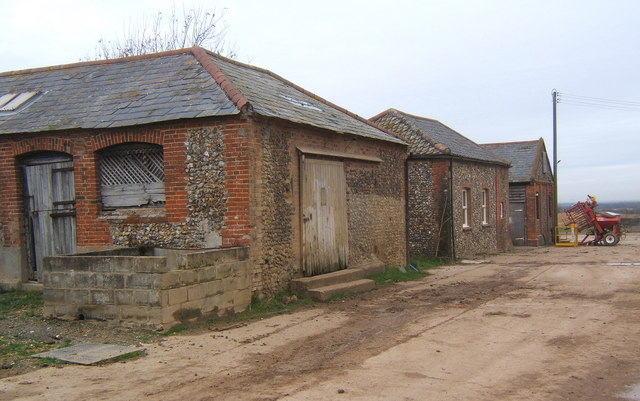
Farm outbuildings at Desning Hall

Desning Hall was a manor house in Dalham, Risbridge Hundred, in Suffolk, England, dating from Anglo-Saxon times. Desning Hall's last resident was Sidney Arthur King who left the property in 1927. The house then stood vacant, becoming derelict, until the early 1980s when it was demolished.
