= Barwick-in-Elmet Castle =

Fortification in the village of Barwick-in-Elmet, West Yorkshire, England

Coordinates: 53.83224°N 1.39675°W

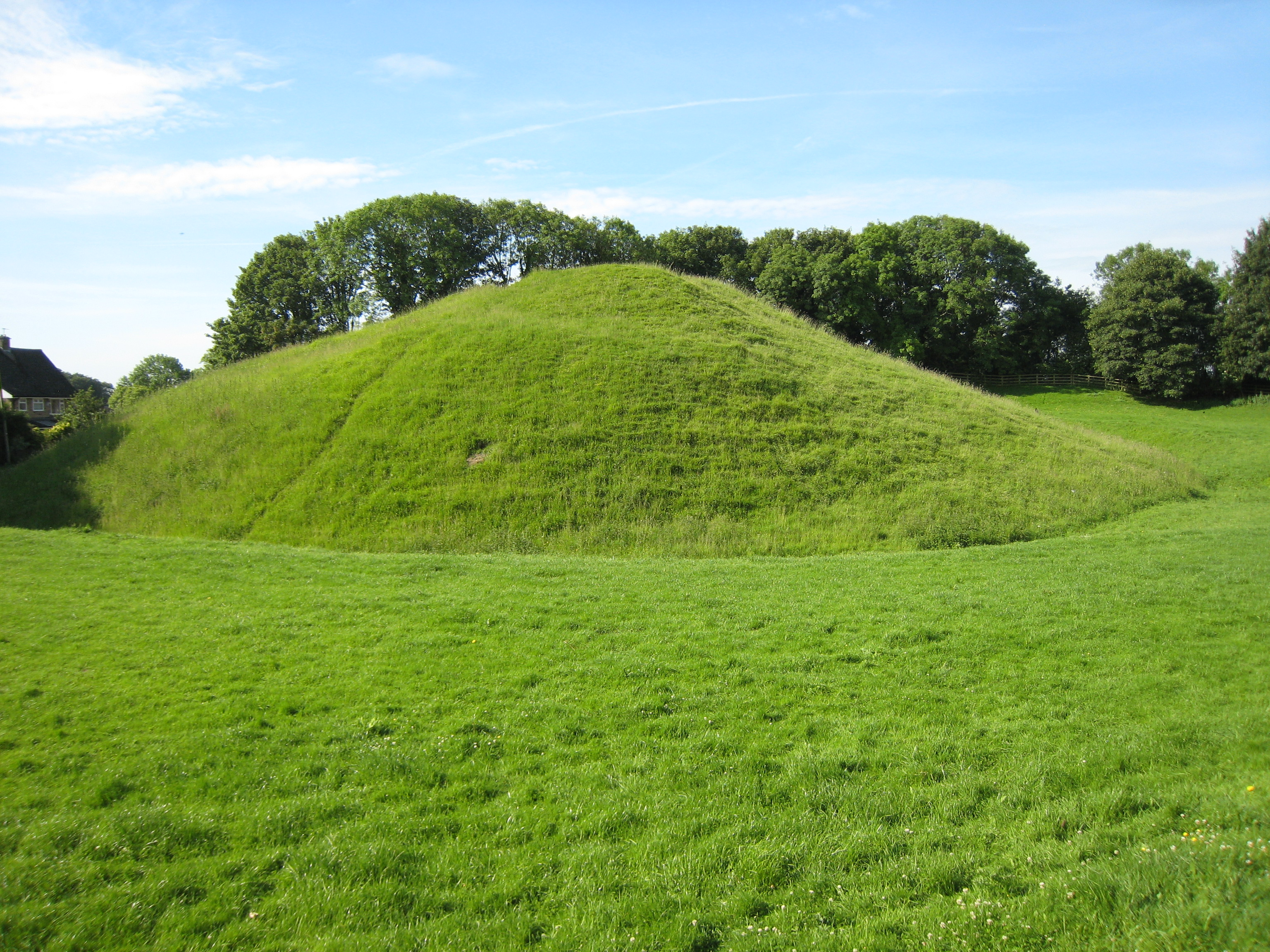
Earthworks of Hall Tower, the location of the former castle

Barwick-in-Elmet Castle was a fortification in the village of Barwick-in-Elmet, West Yorkshire, England to the east of Leeds (grid reference SE398375).

The site of the castle was originally an Iron Age hill fort, the remains of which can be seen even today, and coins dating from the first and second century BC have been discovered in the area. The Romans constructed a bulwark on the northern part of the elevated ground that is nowadays known as Wendel Hill. The village was further developed and fortified during the Dark Ages and became known as the seat of the Kings of Northumbria during the heptarchy, who also housed their granary in the village. According to some sources it was Edwin, King of Northumbria who resided here. After the Norman Conquest the manor house and the lands were awarded to Ilbert de Lacy, the Earl of Lincoln who erected a motte and bailey fortification on a steep elevated hilltop, that came to be known as the Hall Tower Hill. It seems to have had an outer wall as well, surrounded by two trenches, the inner of which according to sources was about thirty three feet deep. After the Lacy's, it was the Duke of Lancaster who took possession of the manor house and the lands.

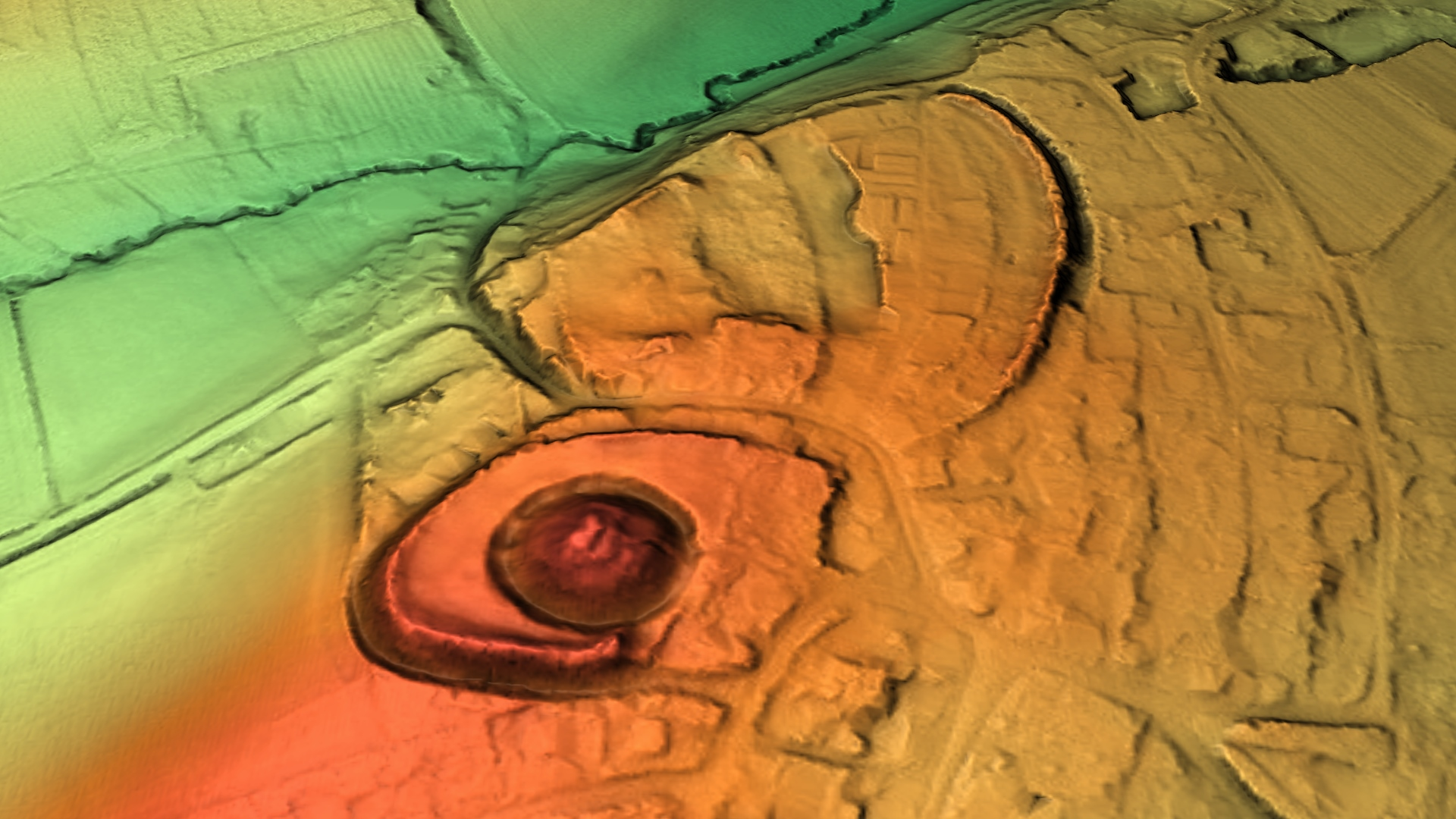
3D view of the digital terrain model

Most of the bailey to the east of Hall Tower Hill has now been built on and destroyed. However the remains of the trench that surrounded the castle are visible, but it now measures only around 14 feet deep.

== Bibliography ==
- Fry, Plantagenet Somerset (1980). The David & Charles Book of Castles. Newton Abbot: David & Charles. p. 184. ISBN 0-7153-7976-3.
