= St. Clare Castle =

Coordinates: 50°43′29″N 1°08′04″W

St. Clare Castle was a castellated mansion in Appley on the Isle of Wight. It was the family seat of St Clare, Appley. Her Majesty Queen Victoria and the Prince Consort visited several times, while Princess Alice and Prince Louis honeymooned at St. Clare in 1862. St. Clare Castle is situated on the coast, about a mile east of Ryde. It was the seat of Colonel Francis Vernon-Harcourt. The grounds and gardens are extensive.
