= Lichfield Castle =

Motte-and-bailey castle in Shropshire, England

- Staffordshire, England

Site information
- Type: Motte-and-bailey castle

Site history
- Built: Possibly c. 1070
- Demolished: Before c. 1540

Lichfield Castle was once a motte-and-bailey castle in Lichfield, Staffordshire, England. No remains exist today and its exact location is unknown.

== History ==
Lichfield Castle was likely built initially from timber around the same time as Stafford Castle and Tamworth Castle in c. 1070, and Lichfield Castle persisted as a timber structure until the early 12th century. It was then rebuilt in stone sometime between 1129 and 1148 by Roger de Clinton, Bishop of Coventry and was probably associated with the crenellations at Cathedral Close built during the 12th century.

Lichfield Castle was mentioned again in 1347, and King Richard II spent Christmas 1397 at Lichfield Castle before he was imprisoned there in 1399, a year before he died.

When John Leyland visited Lichfield around 1540, he noted that Lichfield Castle was demolished and probably existed towards the south of Lichfield around the Castle Field area.

A shopping precinct was built over the Castle Field area but no evidence of Lichfield Castle survived.
