= Moor End Castle =

Quadrangular ruined castle in England

Coordinates: 52°05′41″N 0°54′00″W

The site of Moor End Castle (historically known as Moreende) is situated opposite Moor End Farm, along Moor End Road in the civil parish of Yardley Gobion, within the historic county of Northamptonshire (the Modern Authority of Northamptonshire, the pre-Local Government Act 1972 county of Northamptonshire).

== History ==
The castle was created in 1347 when Thomas de Ferrers was given licence to crenellate his house at Moor End. Later owners sold it to the Crown in 1363.

Edward III regularly visited Moor End during the 1360s, building a royal chamber, a royal chapel and rebuilding the dilapidated gatehouse.

== Ruin ==
Over the following two centuries, the castle passed to a succession of royal and commoner owners before falling into disrepair by 1580, where it was described as "utterly decayed, with no timber or stone remaining".

In 1650 and 1728 the site was known as Castle Yard, and in the 1830s a tenant of Castle Close recovered over 2,000 yards of stone while digging up the foundations.

By the 1970s the only feature visible on the site of the castle was a much-altered moat, fed by the stream which flows from Potterspury Lodge through Moor End to Potterspury village.

Today, a wooded island surrounded by the moat is all that remains.

== Sources ==
- A History of the County of Northamptonshire: Volume 5: The Hundred of Cleley (2002), pp. 289-345 - Riden, Philip and Insley, Charles (eds), 2002
- The Castles of the East Midlands (Malvern) - Salter, Mike, 2002
- Greater Medieval Houses Vol2 (Cambridge), p183 - Emery, Anthony, 2000
- Castellarium Anglicanum (London: Kraus) Vol2, p319 - King, D.J.C., 1983
- An inventory of the historical monuments in the County of Northampton. Vol4: South-west Northamptonshire (HMSO), p175 - RCHME, 1982
- The history of the King's Works Vol2: the Middle Ages (London: HMSO) pp. 742-3 - Colvin, H.M., Brown, R.Allen and Taylor, A.J., 1963
- Some account of Domestic Architecture in England (Oxford) Vol3 pt2, p414 - Turner, T. H. and Parker, J. H., 1859
