= Castlebourne folly =

Castlebourne in Bromsgrove, Worcestershire, England

Coordinates: 52°23′22.5″N 2°05′01.5″W

The Castlebourne folly in the parish of Belbroughton, Worcestershire, England, was built as a sham castle towards the end of the eighteenth century and is similar in age and design to Clent Castle another folly about 2.2 miles (3.5 km) away in an adjacent parish of Clent. In the middle nineteenth century a house, Castlebourne (originally Castle Bourne) was built in a Gothic castle style close to the folly and connected by a wall about 20 yards (18 m) long and 5 yards (4.6 m) high with an archway. The folly, wall and house are designated as a Grade II listed building by English Heritage.

The folly, and the later house, were built on a mound. The folly has a square three-bay plan. The two outer bays are formed by large circular two story corner towers. On the south side, the two towers have pointed windows (some blind), while on the first floor they have quatrefoil windows and relief mouldings above in form of Maltese crosses. The central bay has a blocked pointed doorway with hood mould and returns. The floor above the doorway has a blind pointed first floor window. The roof is of slate behind embattled parapets. The wall connecting the folly to the house faces south-west and has an embattled parapet above a moulded cornice.

It can be spotted in Winter months, if you look up the hill from the dual carriageway below where the original driveway posts are discretely laid a few metres from the road you can get a good glimpse of the castle normally out of view in summertime.
