= Abinger Castle =

Castle in Surrey, England

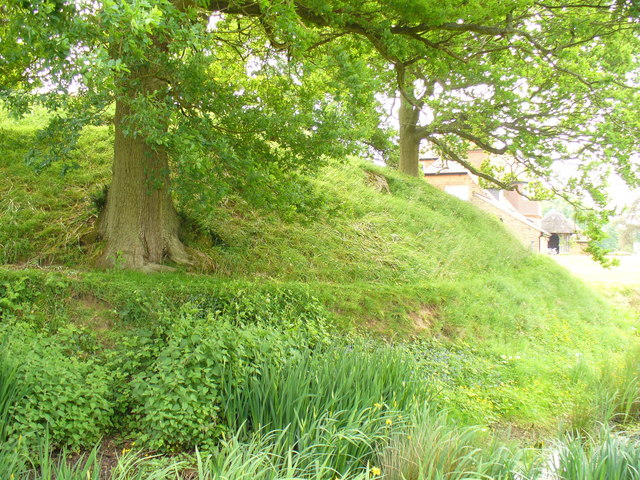
Abinger motte

Abinger Castle is an earthwork motte and bailey that was topped with a small wooden fortress. It is located in Abinger Common, between Guildford and Dorking in Surrey, England.

== History ==
Abinger Castle was founded by William Fitz-Ansculf c. 1100. It was initially composed of wood and was rebuilt in 1140. It had a longer life than most castles of its type, surviving until 1153.

== Surrounding Area ==
=== Manor ===
Abinger Manor is a grade II listed manor house located south of the motte. The manor was recorded in the Domesday Book as land belonging to William fitz Ansculf. The house was re-established in 1688 by John Evelyn and was rebuilt in c. 1872 using some old materials following a new design by Alfred Waterhouse.

=== Church ===
St James' Church was first established in the 12th century and remains due east of the motte. The earliest extant sections of the church are its chancel and north chapel, rebuilt c. 1220. Bombed during World War II, it was restored in 1950 by Frederick Etchells. The church is a grade II* listed building.

=== Mesolithic site ===
There are remains of a Mesolithic pit-dwelling near the motte, representing one of the oldest known and best preserved man-made dwelling remains in Britain. The site is also notable for containing many examples of microlith assemblages. The site is a scheduled monument.

== Excavation ==
The castle was excavated by Brian Hope-Taylor between 1947 and 1949. These excavations revealed the postholes of a wooden tower, a horizontal bridge connecting the motte to the bailey, and a surrounding palisade. The central motte remains, suspected to be of approximately the same height as it originally was, and is a scheduled monument.
