= Bronsil Castle =

Former manor house in Herefordshire, England

Coordinates: 52.03263°N 2.36729°W

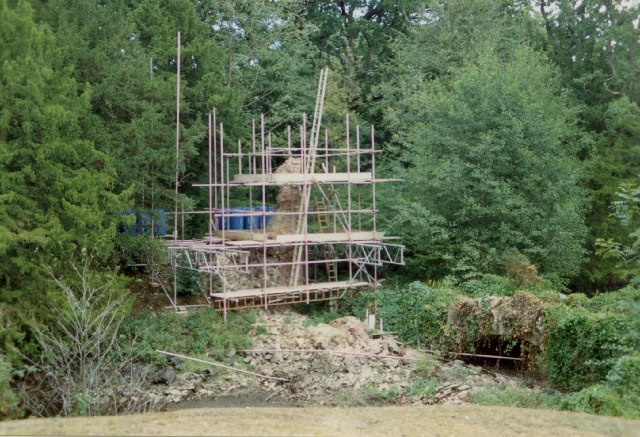
Remains of Bronsil Castle pictured in 2005. Consolidation efforts were underway.

Bronsil Castle was a fortified manor house about 1 mile (1.6 km) to the east of Eastnor in Herefordshire, England near Ledbury). It is a Grade II* listed building, first listed in 1967.

The first record of Bronsil Castle is around 1240, but no description of the structure at that time is given. In 1449 and again in 1460 Richard Beauchamp, Treasurer to Henry VI, was given licence to crenellate his house on the site. In 1644 during the Civil War it was taken and set alight by the Roundheads.

The remains indicate that the manor house was four-sided, with corner and mid-wall tower fortifications. There is an extant moat that surrounds the castle, spanned by a late 19th century bridge. Cracking to the gatehouse tower was noticed in 1990, and during the erection of scaffolding for consolidation works in 1991, much of the tower collapsed into the moat.
