= Burley Castle =

Possible castle in the county of Rutland, England

Coordinates: 52.69741°N 0.67854°W

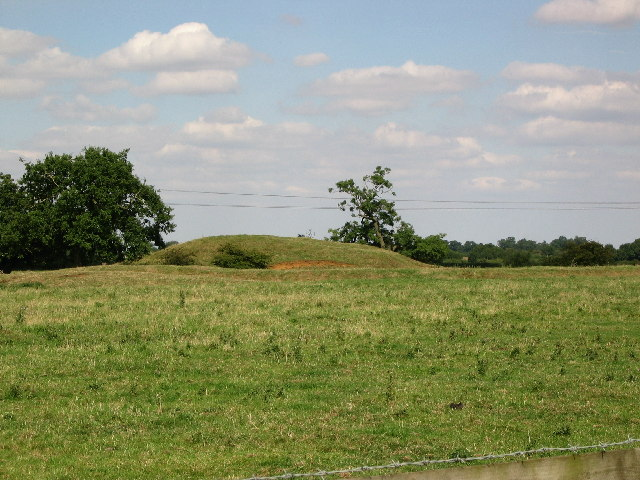
Mound at Alstoe

Burley Castle, more commonly called Alstoe, was to the north of the village of Burley, two miles north-east of Oakham in the county of Rutland, grid reference SK894119. Alstoe was the name of a hundred.

It was originally used as a Saxon moot (c.7th century-11th century). There is doubtful evidence of a small motte and bailey castle of the late 11th or early 12th century (between 1086 and 1153). Only earthworks remain.
