= Fillongley Castle =

Twelfth-century castle in Warwickshire

- Fillongley, England

Site information
- Type: Motte and bailey castle, then a fortified manor house
- Open to the public: Yes
- Condition: Ruined

Location
- Shown within Warwickshire.
- Coordinates: 52.47843°N 1.58945°W
- Grid reference: grid reference SP00109848

Site history
- Built: Castle Hills: c. 1135; Castle Yard: c. 1135
- In use: Castle Hills: c. 1135 to 13th century; Castle Yard: c. 1135 to 15th century
- Materials: Timber and later stone masonry

Fillongley Castle was a motte and bailey castle and later a fortified manor house in Fillongley in Warwickshire, England. Today, only earthworks and partial ruins exist.

The Castle Yard site has been a scheduled monument since 1951. The Castle Hill or Hills site has been a scheduled monument since 1925.

== History ==
=== Castle Hills ===
The first castle at Fillongley, formerly known as Fillungeleye Castle, was located at Castle Hills and was constructed from timber with a moat around 1135 and was abandoned by the 13th century, probably before 1272. It was known as Old Fillongley during the reign of Henry III (1216-1272).

=== Castle Yard ===
The second castle, located in Castle Yard, was probably a fortified manor house (also with a moat), held by the de Hastings family and built around the same time, c. 1135.

On 2 February 1301, John Hastings (1262–1313), Baron Bergavenny, had received the licence to crenellate his "manor and town of Fillongley in Warwickshire". He was buried at the Greyfriars in Coventry. The manor house was still standing during the reign of Edward III (1327–1377), but was unoccupied by the de Hastings. In 1389, it passed to the Beauchamp family holding the Earl of Warwick title and was repurposed into a manor house during the 14th century before being abandoned during the 15th century, with stone from the castle being used to repair buildings within the village of Fillongley.

Most of the surviving ruins of Fillongley Castle have remained unchanged since at least the 19th century and have been owned by Bonds Hospital Charity since 1980. The site of the castle had become overgrown by c. 2012, so the ruins were sprayed with Mircam, which also led to partial habitat destruction and loss of biodiversity.
