= Grade II* listed buildings in Bromsgrove (district) =

Worcestershire shown within England

There are over 20,000 Grade II* listed buildings in England. This page is a list of these buildings in the district of Bromsgrove in Worcestershire.

== Bromsgrove ==
Name	Location	Type	Completed (Note: The date given is the date used by Historic England as significant for the initial building or that of an important part in the structure's description.)	Date designated	Grid ref. (Note: Sometimes known as OSGB36, the grid reference is based on the British national grid reference system used by the Ordnance Survey.) Geo-coordinates	Entry number (Note: The "List Entry Number" is a unique number assigned to each listed building and scheduled monument by Historic England.)	Image
Church of St Laurence	Alvechurch, Bromsgrove	Parish Church	12th century	16 November 1967	SP0266472445; 52°21′00″N 1°57′44″W	1100225	Church of St Laurence More images
Seechem Manor	Alvechurch, Bromsgrove	House	CIRCA LATE 16th century	16 July 1986	SP0520172756; 52°21′10″N 1°55′30″W	1100220	Upload Photo
The Old House	Alvechurch, Bromsgrove	House	Mid 19th century	23 April 1952	SP0273972593; 52°21′05″N 1°57′40″W	1100224	The Old House More images
Bradford House and adjoining Garden Walls	Belbroughton, Bromsgrove	House	Late 17th century	23 April 1952	SO9208476341; 52°23′06″N 2°07′04″W	1348574	Bradford House and adjoining Garden Walls
Chapel about 80m north of Bell Hall	Belbroughton, Bromsgrove	Chapel	c. 1200	23 April 1952	SO9347277192; 52°23′34″N 2°05′50″W	1166799	Upload Photo
Church of the Holy Trinity	Belbroughton, Bromsgrove	Parish Church	12th century	16 November 1967	SO9192076862; 52°23′23″N 2°07′13″W	1301271	Church of the Holy Trinity More images
Fairfield Court	Fairfield, Belbroughton, Bromsgrove	Farmhouse	16th century	23 April 1952	SO9456775946; 52°22′53″N 2°04′52″W	1100120	Upload Photo
Church of St Leonard	Clent, Bromsgrove	Parish Church	12th century	16 November 1967	SO9285579350; 52°24′44″N 2°06′23″W	1167000	Church of St Leonard More images
Field House	Clent, Bromsgrove	House	Mid 18th century	16 November 1967	SO9108879476; 52°24′48″N 2°07′57″W	1166943	Upload Photo
Church of St Michael	Cofton Hackett, Bromsgrove	Parish Church	14th century	16 July 1986	SP0117975352; 52°22′34″N 1°59′03″W	1348568	Church of St Michael More images
Cofton Hall	Cofton Hackett, Bromsgrove	Country House	Early 18th century	23 April 1952	SP0101575022; 52°22′24″N 1°59′11″W	1167600	Cofton Hall More images
Church of the Holy Trinity and St Mary	Dodford, Dodford with Grafton, Bromsgrove	Parish Church	1907-8	17 July 1986	SO9321772479; 52°21′01″N 2°06′04″W	1100097	Church of the Holy Trinity and St Mary More images
Dodford Priory	Dodford, Dodford with Grafton, Bromsgrove	Farmhouse	Early 17th century	23 April 1952	SO9325572834; 52°21′13″N 2°06′02″W	1100095	Upload Photo
Grafton Manor and Chapel Adjoining to South West	Dodford with Grafton, Bromsgrove	House	Early 16th century	23 April 1952	SO9391269183; 52°19′15″N 2°05′27″W	1100131	Grafton Manor and Chapel Adjoining to South West More images
Church of St Leonard	Frankley, Bromsgrove	Parish Church	15th century	16 November 1967	SO9989580409; 52°25′18″N 2°00′11″W	1100104	Church of St Leonard More images
Church of St John the Baptist	Hagley, Bromsgrove	Parish Church	13th century	16 November 1967	SO9207580769; 52°25′29″N 2°07′05″W	1100106	Church of St John the Baptist More images
Obelisk about 3/4 Mile North of Hagley Hall	Wychbury Hill, Hagley, Bromsgrove	Obelisk	Mid 18th century	23 April 1952	SO9210181646; 52°25′58″N 2°07′03″W	1167587	Obelisk about 3/4 Mile North of Hagley Hall More images
Prince of Wales Column	Hagley, Bromsgrove	Column	Mid/Late 18th century	17 July 1986	SO9226780976; 52°25′36″N 2°06′55″W	1167574	Prince of Wales Column More images
The Castle About 3/4 Mile East of Hagley Hall	Hagley Park, Hagley, Bromsgrove	Folly	1747	23 November 1979	SO9289680634; 52°25′25″N 2°06′21″W	1348597	The Castle About 3/4 Mile East of Hagley Hall More images
The Old Dairy about 120m north of Hagley Hall	Hagley Park, Hagley, Bromsgrove	Dairy	Mid/Late 18th century	16 November 1967	SO9191180854; 52°25′32″N 2°07′13″W	1167568	Upload Photo
The Rotunda about 1/2 Mile north-east of Hagley Hall	Hagley Park, Hagley, Bromsgrove	Rotunda	1747	17 July 1986	SO9283380953; 52°25′35″N 2°06′25″W	1348598	The Rotunda about 1/2 Mile north-east of Hagley Hall More images
Guesten Hall Roof	Avoncroft Museum of Historic Buildings, Stoke, Bromsgrove	Guest House	c. 1320	16 July 1986	SO9522968422; 52°18′50″N 2°04′17″W	1348531	Upload Photo
Cattespool	Tutnall and Cobley, Bromsgrove	Farmhouse	c. 1640	23 April 1952	SP0068171107; 52°20′17″N 1°59′29″W	1168031	Cattespool
Church of St Bartholomew	Tardebigge, Tutnall and Cobley, Bromsgrove	Parish Church	1777	16 November 1967	SO9955769136; 52°19′13″N 2°00′29″W	1100167	Church of St Bartholomew More images
Chadwick Manor	Lydiate Ash, Bromsgrove	House	Late 17th century	28 April 1952	SO9738876071; 52°22′58″N 2°02′23″W	1348486	Chadwick Manor More images
7, Worcester Road. Former Golden Lion Public House	Bromsgrove	Public House	18th century	28 April 1952	SO9584970570; 52°20′00″N 2°03′44″W	1100367	Upload Photo
