= Hagley Park, Worcestershire =

Estate in Worcestershire, England

Coordinates: 52°25′30″N 2°06′50″W

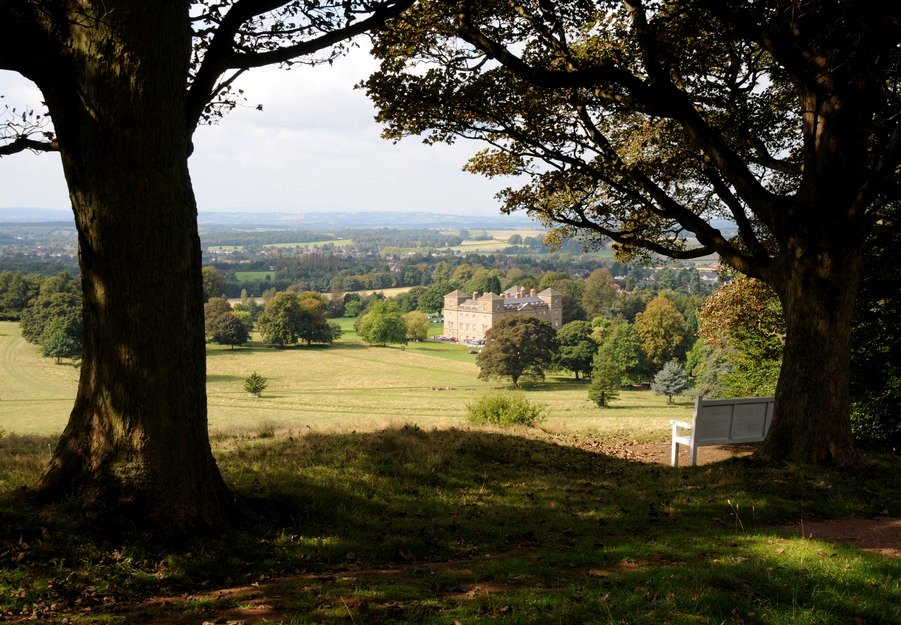
The view from Milton's Seat in Hagley Park

Hagley Park is the landscaped grounds around Hagley Hall in Worcestershire, England. The grounds comprise 350 acres (1.4 km^{2}) of undulating deer park on the lower slopes of the Clent Hills. They were redeveloped and landscaped between about 1739 and 1764, with follies designed by John Pitt (of Encombe), Thomas Pitt, James "Athenian" Stuart, and Sanderson Miller. Planned as part of an 18th-century enthusiasm for landscape gardening, especially among poets, the park brought many distinguished literary visitors to admire the views, as well as poetic tributes to their beauty and Classical taste

The park is open to the public, with admission charges (the house is generally not visitable).

== The appeal of the past ==
A park adjacent to the former manor house at Hagley was mentioned in the 14th century as having an embanked ditch as boundary, traces of which still remain. The grounds eventually fell into disuse and were only renewed at the end of 17th century by Charles Lyttelton. It was his grandson George, however, who was chiefly responsible for landscaping them in the Neoclassical taste and making them one of the foremost examples of the style in England. In particular he started a tradition of abandoning the European taste for formal gardens, incorporating instead the natural beauty of the landscape. The charm of the grounds was further underlined by the creation of buildings in diverse styles: some that recreated ancient Greek and Roman examples, another being a gothic folly. About the grounds were various inscriptions underlining the fact that this was a literary landscape which reflected the shaping vision of some of the leading poets of the 18th century.

Because the grounds were wide and extended up valleys and over wooded hillsides, it was impossible to take in the whole as a single vista. Instead there was a circuit often described in contemporary works, such as the introduction to Thomas Maurice’s Hagley: A Descriptive Poem (Oxford 1776), which guided the reader along a route through alternating light and shade, open and closed prospects, rises and descents. Along the way were memorials to poets that commanded outlooks either across an open area within the park, such as that from Pope's Seat, or else down to the Hall and then across to the distant hills beyond, as from Milton's seat. On the south-eastern boundary there was access to an even wider prospect from the summit of Clent Hill, where yet another memorial was erected. It consisted of four rough-hewn pillars, the so-called Ossian’s Tomb, known also as the Druid's Temple or later simply as the Four Stones.

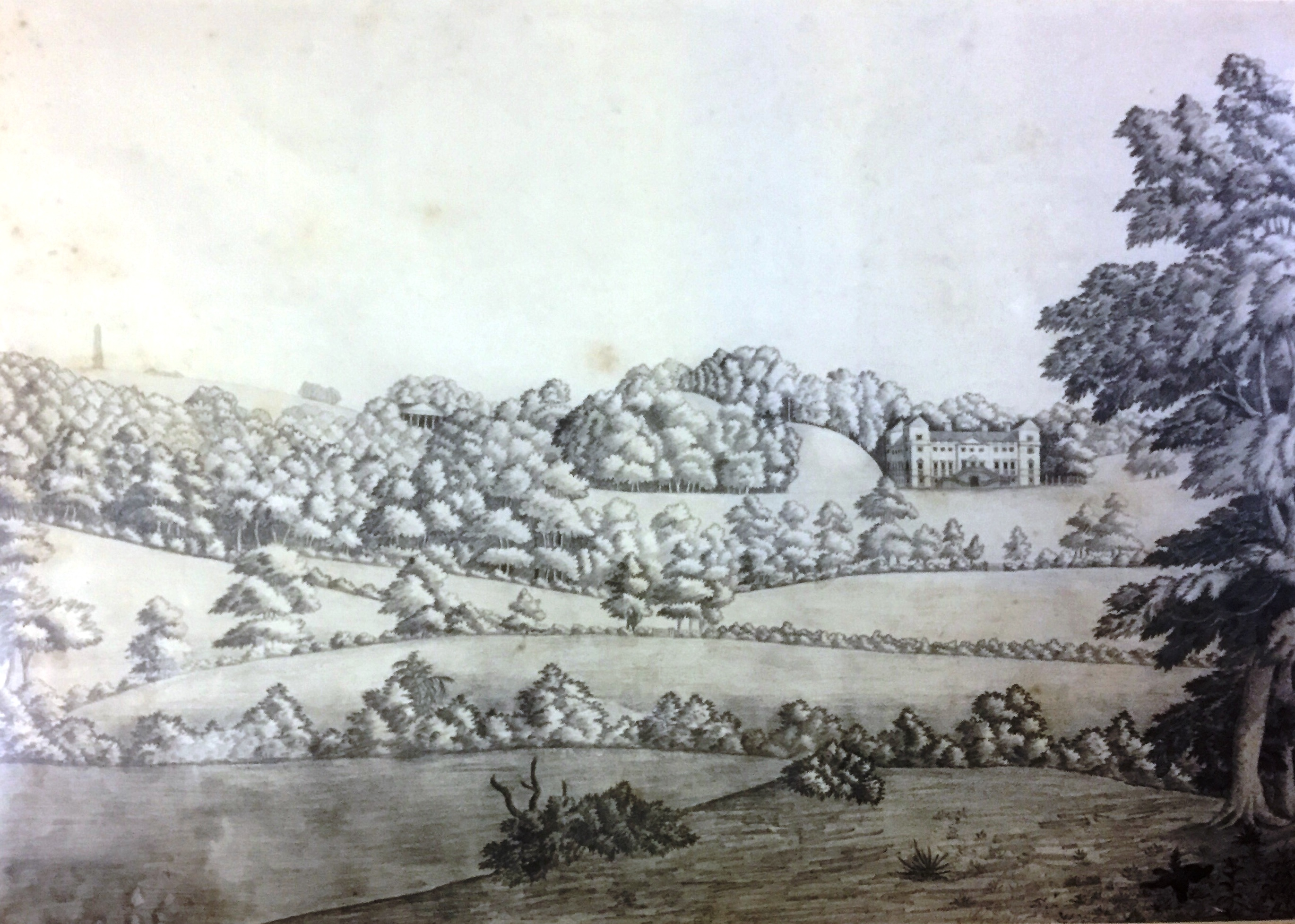
A 19th century pencil sketch of the Park showing Hagley Hall, the Temple of Theseus and Wychbury Obelisk

Another series of prospects was associated with Wychbury Hill to the north, towards which the old road to Halesowen climbed in a hollow way from between the church and the former site of the Hall. On the slope immediately overlooking the new Hall was a column, originally the gift of George Lyttelton's old employer, Frederick, Prince of Wales, which was moved to that position as a memorial following the prince's death in 1751. Beyond that was the Wychbury Obelisk, raised in 1758 by an illegitimate Lyttelton half-brother, Admiral Thomas Smith, who lived at nearby Rockingham Hall. On the way there was the Temple of Theseus built for George Lyttelton's father by James Stuart in imitation of the ancient Temple of Hephaestus at Athens. Its purpose was to serve both as a landscape feature visible from the Hall and to "command a most beautiful View of the Country" round about. Along the course of the old road on its way there was the rectory, and near it Jacob's Well, the original water source for the Hall, and a quarry that produced the stone known as Hagley-rag. Above the quarry was the site of Thomson’s Seat, at one time an octagonal building in a grove before it was destroyed by the fall of a tree.

The circuit of the grounds as described by Thomas Maurice began at the parish church, which in the 18th century was entirely lost behind trees, and took a path "to a gloomy hollow, whose steep banks are covered with large rocky stones, as if rent asunder by some violent concussion of nature." On the bank above was an elegant Palladian bridge from which one looked up along a sequence of three lakes one above the other to a Rotunda (the work of John Pitt in about 1748) crowning the valley's head. This was a circular Ionic structure, also known as Pope's Temple in the past. On the bridge itself (a later work by Thomas Pitt) were lines by Catullus recalling the Classical Vale of Tempe overhung by woods (Tempe quae sylvae cingunt superimpendentes).

Ascending the left bank, one reached a grotto of "grotesque stone alcoves and seats shaded with laurels" above a cascade decorated with glittering vitrified slag from the old glass industry in the area. Beyond that was the first memorial to an English poet in the circuit, a tall stone urn dedicated to William Shenstone. A further climb through woods brought one to open grassland and another urn dedicated to Alexander Pope beyond the Rotunda. From there a woodland walk climbed to an ivy-covered castellated ruin, completed in 1748 and designed by Sanderson Miller. The Gothic style windows of this are said to have been transferred from the remains of Halesowen Abbey. Of the castle's four towers, only one was intact and that was inhabited at the period by the park keeper. Continuing within the park, rather than leaving by the gate to Clent Hill, one next encountered a pebble-floored rustic hermitage composed of roots and moss and near it a curved seat of contemplation with its Latin name (sedes contemplationis) spelled out in snail shells. The design for this may even have been Alexander Pope's and was associated with a description of such a retreat in Milton's Il Penseroso. Leaving this haven, the path descended and then climbed to Milton's Seat itself, with its panoramic view. From there one returned downhill to the Hall.

Up until the mid-19th century the park was generally open to the public, "And citizens who take the air/ Full oft to Hagley Park repair," a local author observed. No doubt some carried with them one or other of the tourist guides published at the time. But because of the vandalism caused by some visitors, only supervised access was allowed thereafter. Time, the weather and neglect were also taking their toll over the years, causing some features in the grounds to disappear completely. Only comparatively recently has restoration work begun, starting with the Wychbury Obelisk in 2011. More recently the Palladian Bridge was rebuilt and the vista opened up the valley to the repaired Rotunda at its head. Paths are now being brought back into use, and new trees planted, in preparation for opening the park up once again.

== A poetical landscape ==
The development of the 18th century English park was the product of those educated in the Classics during the Augustan age, men whose imagination had been taught to interpret a landscape through the eyes of the Latin and Greek poets, and also in part by the Classical landscapes of Claude Lorrain and Nicolas Poussin. Although examples from neither of those painters were to be found in Hagley Hall, in the parlour there hung Arcadian landscapes by their later Baroque counterpart, Francesco Zuccarelli, and visitors to Hagley certainly compared aspects of the grounds to paintings by Poussin. Jacob's Well reminded Horace Walpole of "the Samaritan Woman's in a picture of Nicolo Poussin," while James Heely found in the prospect uphill to the Prince's Column "a landscape that would do honour to the pencil of Poussin – an inexpressible glow of the sublime and beautiful, in all the fullness of their powers".

Chiefly, though, the landscaping of Hagley Park was a poetical project. Among visitors were Alexander Pope, who had developed his own more modest grounds at Twickenham, and William Shenstone who, in addition to his work on his own property at The Leasowes, helped develop the garden at the neighbouring Enville Hall. Other poets with an interest in garden development who wrote poetical tributes to Hagley were William Mason and Richard Meadowcourt (1695–1760). One other visitor was Henrietta Knight, Lady Luxborough who, while she lived, was at the centre of the circle of local landscaping poets, and who came to view the newly constructed "Giant's Castle" in 1748.

Lord Lyttelton was himself a poet and erected monuments about the grounds to those poets whom he admired and counted as his friends: Shenstone, Pope, Thomson, Milton. The inclusion of the last of these was an aesthetic announcement of the new taste in landscape gardening there which, eschewing European artificiality, took its lead from the description of Eden in the fourth book of Paradise Lost. In his essay on "The History of the Modern Taste in Gardening" (1780), Horace Walpole was to commend Milton's description as "a warmer and more just picture of the present style than Claude Lorrain could have painted from Hagley or Stourhead", going on then to apply Milton's lines on the management of water to the principal garden vista at Hagley

Which through veins

Of porous earth with kindly thirst updrawn,
Rose a fresh fountain and with many a rill
Water’d the garden; then united fell
Down the steep glade.

In addition, lines from Milton appeared at two other sites in the park. Within the Hermitage was inscribed the description of the "mossy cell" to which the devotee of melancholy will withdraw, taken from Il Penseroso; while on Milton's Seat, with its broad outlook over the countryside, appeared the passage beginning "These are thy glorious works, parent of good" from the fifth book of Paradise Lost.

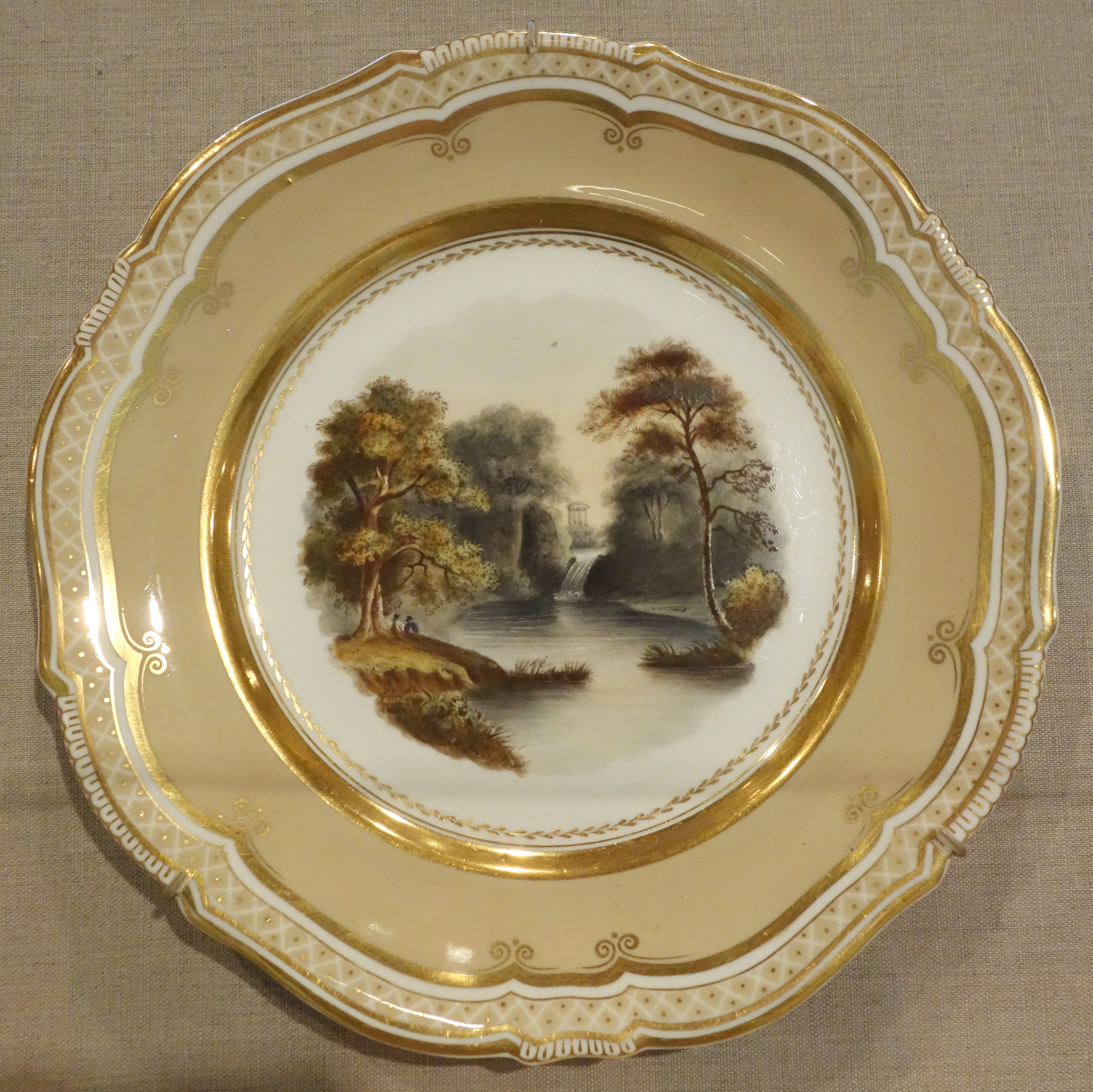
"The British Tempe" on an early 19th century serving plate

William Mason, author of a poetical essay on The English Garden (1772-82), had earlier taken up the criticism of artificiality (also present in Milton) in his "Ode to a water nymph" (1758), particularly the way water was forced from its natural course and into regularity. The poem then ends in a compliment to Lyttelton‘s water vista at Hagley as the principal example of naturalness. But even before Lyttelton had begun work on it in the valley above his house, James Thomson had recognised its Classical possibilities and christened it

The British Tempe! There along the dale,
With woods o'er-hung, and shagg'd with mossy rocks,
Whence on each hand the gushing waters play;
And down the rough cascade white-dashing fall,
Or gleam in lengthened vista thro' the trees.

This was written following his first visit to Hagley in 1743 and introduced the following year into the Spring section of his revised The Seasons. Only in 1762 did work on the Palladian Bridge begin, when Lyttelton followed Thomson's lead by incorporating there the reference to the Vale of Tempe by Catullus.

Remote echoes of Thomson's evocation are heard in the "ever murmuring streams and ever tinkling rills" of Richard Meadowcourt's address to Lyttelton and in the diminished sound of "each tinkling rill" in Anthony Pasquin’s "Verses written at Hagley on the 4th of December, 1788". Pasquin also recalled the distinguished poetic visitors to the place, as did Mary Leadbeater in her lilting "On a visit to Hagley Park". But these would be mere distractions to the youthful Romanticism of Chauncy Hare Townshend in his "Sonnet on visiting Hagley". Ardent admiration forgives what is now perceived as the artifice of 18th century landscaping, and forgets the literary associations of a bygone age, as it responds naturally to the handiwork of "Nature's God". But Townshend only echoes misgivings expressed (though more diplomatically) by earlier visitors. Thomas Maurice exclaims

Ah, Lyttelton, in vain thy fancy strives
To imitate, where real nature lives –
For still in spite of thee, in spite of art,
Her antient spirit breathes thro’ every part.

And James Heely follows him at greater length:

Not that I would mean to throw the least reflexion on the confinement of a spot, replete with such beauty as this is…but I may lament, from the pleasure it afforded me, that the same flowery taste did not spring even from the rough scene preceding that of the alcove, which had it taken effect, instead of the present reservoirs, would have risen (properly conducted) the most delectable scene the powers of genius and taste have to give.

One other person's name was linked with Hagley Park, that of Lucy (born Fortescue), George Lyttelton's first wife, who died in 1746, before the park's main development. Thomson represents her as accompanying her husband on walks about the grounds, although under the poetic name of Lucinda. The association was deepened by Lyttelton's monody "To the memory of a lady lately deceased", which is set in the grounds at the start, and whose fifth stanza, beginning "O Shades of Hagley, where is now your Boast?" was particularly admired. In its wake came references to Lyttelton's sorrow as the burden of Hagley's streams in Mason's "Ode to a Water Nymph" and to his monody in Maurice's descriptive poem.

The English private parks that developed in the 18th century coincided with a consciousness of national identity and self-confidence. That Lord Lyttelton, the creator of Hagley, was a patriot dedicated to the national good was a theme developed by several of the poets who invoked the place: by Thomson, as being one of the themes taking Lyttelton's mind from appreciation of the beauty surrounding him; by Mason, whose ode closes with a compliment to Lyttelton's parliamentary performance; and by James Woodhouse, who conceives of Hagley as a place where the patriotic lord can withdraw from the tawdry temptations of the capital. Maurice's descriptive poem dated from after Lyttelton's death and closed with the patriotic hope that Britain will triumph against its continental rivals, lately allied against it during the American Revolutionary War. Some three years later, at a time of damaged national confidence, the second Baron Lyttleton finds in Hagley a place of retreat from Parliamentary strife and ambition. Though poetic tributes to the park were to continue, the past glories that were its inspiration are only memories now. The place

Where Thomson sang in songs sublime,
And Pope and Lyttelton could rhyme,
And still where modern bards resort,

had become a tourist attraction.

== Bibliography ==
Some old guides to the Park:

- Thomas Martyn, The English Connoisseur: containing an account of whatever is curious in painting, sculpture, &c. in the palaces and seats of the nobility and principal gentry of England, London 1766; "Hagley Park, the seat of Lord Lyttelton", Vol.1, pp.62-9
- Thomas Maurice, the introduction to Hagley: A Descriptive Poem, Oxford 1776, pp.3-14
- James Heely, A Description of Hagley Park in the form of six letters, London 1777, p.23ff
- Anon, A Companion to the Leasowes, Hagley, and Enville (Birmingham 1789); the description of Hagley Park on pp.43-74 is dependent on Maurice's poem and introduction
- William Scott, Stourbridge and its Vicinity, Stourbridge 1832, pp.258-264
- William Harris, Clentine Rambles, Stourbridge 1845; revised and enlarged 1868, pp.13-21
- Tom Pagett, The Follies and Other Features of Hagley Park, Worcestershire, Hagley Historical and Field Society, 1994
