= Who put Bella in the wych elm? =

Unidentified murder victim in the United Kingdom

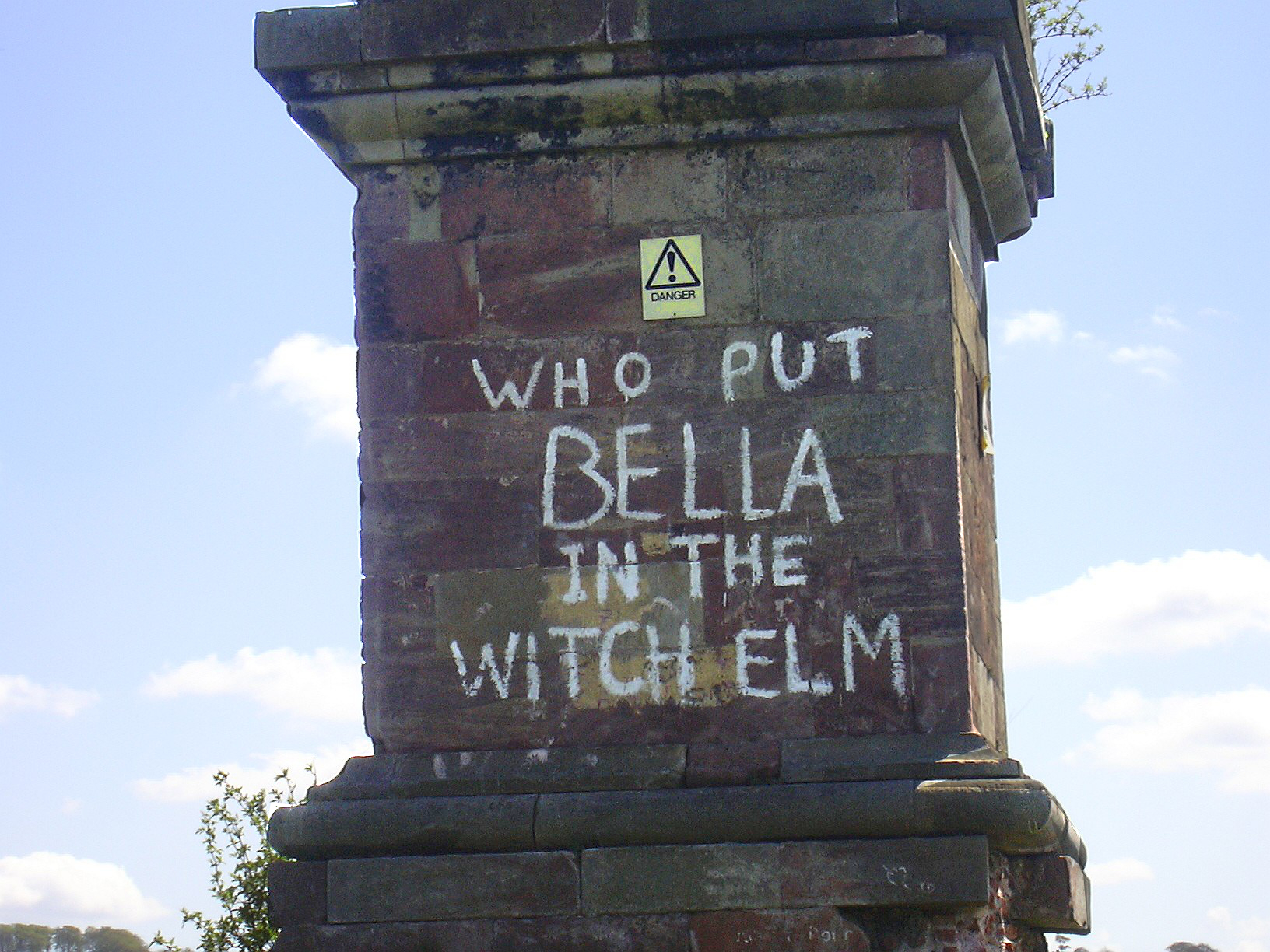
Modern graffiti, photographed in 2006, on the Wychbury Obelisk

"Who put Bella in the wych elm?" is the final form of a series of graffiti connected with the discovery in 1943 of the remains of a murdered woman inside a wych elm on the outskirts of Hagley in Worcestershire. The body has remained unidentified and the case unsolved since then, prompting many media articles and films, as well as dramas, an opera and a musical.

== Discovery ==
On 18 April 1943, four local boys (Robert Hart, Thomas Willetts, Bob Farmer and Fred Payne) were poaching or bird-nesting (Note: Sources vary.) in Hagley Wood, part of the estate belonging to Lord Cobham near Wychbury Hill, when they came across a large wych elm. (Note: The tree is described in some sources as a "wych-hazel", an old name for the same kind of elm.) Thinking the location to be a particularly good place to search for birds' nests, Farmer attempted to climb the tree to investigate. As he climbed, he glanced down into the hollow trunk and discovered a skull. At first, he believed it to be that of an animal, but after seeing human hair and teeth, he realised that he had found a human skull. As they were on the land illegally, Farmer put the skull back and all four boys returned home without mentioning their discovery to anybody. However, on returning home, the eldest of the boys, Willetts, felt uneasy about what he had witnessed and decided to report the find to his parents.

== Investigation ==
When police checked the trunk of the tree they found an almost complete skeleton, which was dressed in a striped cardigan, a mustard coloured skirt, and blue crêpe soled shoes sized 5 1/2. A gold wedding ring was also found with the remains. The skull was valuable evidence, in that it still had some tufts of hair and had a clear dental pattern, despite some missing teeth. After further investigation, the remains of a hand were found some distance from the tree.

The body was sent for forensic examination by the Birmingham-based Home Office pathologist James Webster. He quickly established that it was that of a woman who had been dead for at least 18 months, placing time of death in or before October 1941. She was believed to be aged between 25-40 and 5ft tall. Webster also discovered a section of taffeta in her mouth, suggesting that she had died from suffocation. From the measurement of the trunk in which the body had been discovered, he also deduced that it must have been placed there "still warm" after the killing, as it could not have fit once rigor mortis had taken hold. Investigation into the shoes she was found wearing revealed they could not have been made prior to 1940.

Police could tell from items found with the body what the woman had looked like, but with so many people reported missing during the Second World War, records were too numerous for a proper identification to take place. They cross-referenced the details they had with reports of missing persons throughout the region, but none of them seemed to match the evidence. In addition, they contacted dentists in the area since the dentistry was quite distinctive.

=== 21st century ===
A case review by West Mercia Police was closed in 2014.

A 2018 episode of the television programme Nazi Murder Mysteries described a forensic facial reconstruction, undertaken by the Liverpool John Moores University's "Face Lab", from photographs of the skull. It was commissioned by Andrew Sparke, for his books on the incident.

In May 2023, the BBC launched an appeal to museums, to track down the victim's remains with the intention of carrying out DNA analysis. The remains had, until the late 1960s or early 1970s, been in the Birmingham City Police's "black museum" at their Tally Ho! training centre. The appeal was made in conjunction with a BBC podcast on the case, The Body in the Tree.

== Graffiti ==
In 1944, graffiti related to the mystery began to appear on the walls of nearby areas.

The first, "Who put Luebella down the wych elm?", was found chalked on a wall on Haden Hill Road, Old Hill. Police believed it to have been written prior to Christmas 1943, but had only become aware of its existence following the discovery of further graffiti in 1944.

The phrase "Who put Bella down the wych elm - Hagley Wood?" was written on an empty building in Upper Dean Street, Birmingham, in March 1944. Two days later, the phrase "Hagley Wood Bella" was discovered on a building on the nearby Pershore Street. Since the writing was too high to have been done by boys, the graffiti was taken seriously. Comparisons of the handwriting lead police to believe the phrases were all written by the same person. The unusual spelling of "wych" made police suspect it may have been a countryman who may have been in the area for the local market.

Since at least the 1970s, similar graffiti have sporadically appeared on the Hagley Obelisk, near where the woman's body was discovered. The latest, dating from 1999, was modified to "Who put Bella in the witch elm?", favouring the witchcraft theory. Then in 2020, the "who" in white was overpainted in red with "hers", surmised by the Stourbridge News to be the name of a Birmingham graffiti artist.

== Theories ==
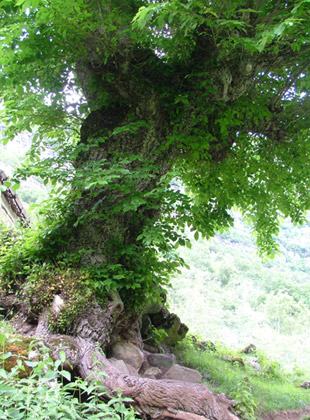
An ancient wych elm

In a Radio 4 programme first broadcast in August 2014, Steve Punt suggested two possible victims. One possible victim was reported to the police in 1944 by a Birmingham sex worker. In the report, she stated that another sex worker called Bella, who worked on the Hagley Road, had disappeared about three years previously. The name "Bella" (or "Luebella") suggested the graffiti writer was probably aware of the identity of the victim.

A second possibility came from a statement made to police in 1953 by Una Mossop, in which she said that her ex-husband Jack Mossop had confessed to family members that he and a Dutchman, whose surname was known to be Van Raalte, had put the woman in the tree. Mossop and Van Raalte met for a drink at the Lyttelton Arms (a pub in Hagley). Later that night, Mossop said, the woman became drunk and passed out while they were driving. The men put her in a hollow tree in the woods in the hope that in the morning she would wake up and be frightened into seeing the error of her ways. Jack Mossop was confined to a Stafford mental hospital because he had recurring dreams of a woman staring out at him from a tree. He died in the hospital before the body in the wych elm was found. The likelihood of this being the correct explanation is questioned because Una Mossop did not come forward with this information until more than 10 years after Jack Mossop's death.

Another theory comes from an MI5 declassified file about Josef Jakobs – the last man to be put to death in the Tower of London, on 15 August 1941. An Abwehr agent, he parachuted into Cambridgeshire in 1941 but broke his ankle when landing and was soon arrested by the Home Guard. On his person was found a photo purportedly of his lover, a German cabaret singer and actress named Clara Bauerle. Jakobs said that she was being trained as a spy and that, had he made contact, she might have been sent over to England after him. However, there is no evidence that Clara Bauerle was parachuted into England, and several witnesses describe that Clara Bauerle was around 6 ft (180 cm) tall, while Bella was 5 ft (150 cm). In September 2016, it was determined that Clara Bauerle had died in Berlin on 16 December 1942.

In 1945, Margaret Murray, an anthropologist and archaeologist at University College, London, proposed a more radical theory, witchcraft. She theorised, based on the severing of one hand, that the victim had been murdered in an occult ritual to create a "Hand of Glory". Her ideas excited the local press and led investigators to consider another seemingly ritualistic killing of a man, Charles Walton, in nearby Lower Quinton.

In 1953, another theory surfaced, namely that the victim was a Dutchwoman named Clarabella Dronkers, and she had been killed by a German spy ring consisting of a British officer, a Dutchman and a music hall artist, for "knowing too much". Available records and evidence were unable to support the story.

== Cultural references ==
In 2003, Simon Holt composed a chamber opera with the title "Who Put Bella in the Wych Elm?" to his own libretto. A play with the same title was later commissioned from the Los Angeles writer and director Katherine Vondy in 2019 and produced in 2022. There have also been a number of smaller scale dramatic presentations in Britain, for the most part serving as staged docudramas or as educational exercises. They include "Bella in the Wychelm" by David Morris at The Stourbridge Theatre Company in 2007; Tom Lee Rutter's film Bella in the Wych Elm (2017); Who Put Bella in the Wych Elm? at London's The Space in March 2018, written and adapted from archive sources by Leah Francis and director Tom Drayton; the 2018 novel The Witch Elm by Tana French; a musical of the same title by Ellis Kerkhoven, and score by Adam Gerber, at the Royal Central School of Speech and Drama in 2019; Francesca Haydon-White's 2021 theatrical documentary in Durham; and the ME Dance Company's project in Walsall (2023) and Wolverhampton (2024).
