= William Lyttelton, 1st Baron Lyttelton =

British politician and colonial administrator (1724–1808)

The Right Honourable The Lord Lyttelton MP
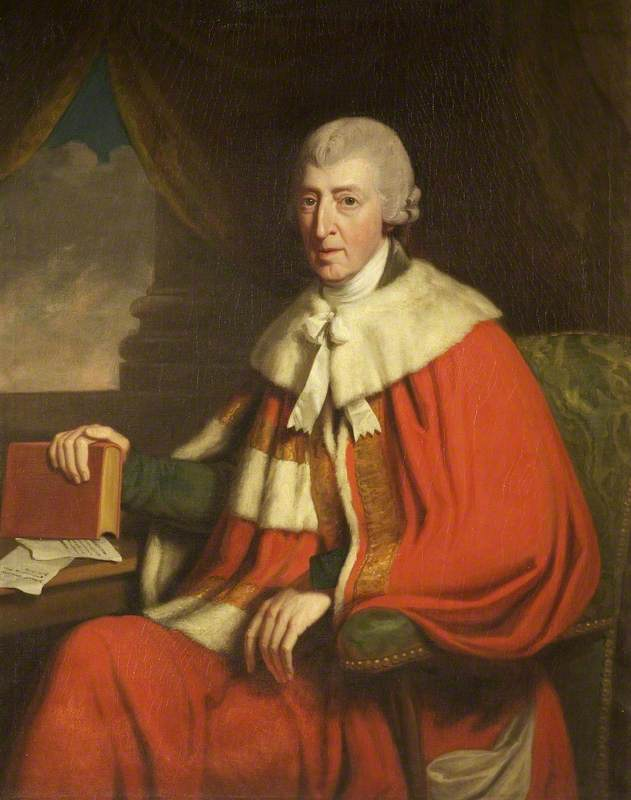
- Portrait by Samuel Woodforde

Governor of Jamaica
- In office 1762–1766
- Preceded by: Henry Moore (acting)
- Succeeded by: Roger Hope Elletson

26th Governor of South Carolina
- In office 1 June 1756 – 5 April 1760
- Monarch: George II
- Preceded by: James Glen
- Succeeded by: Thomas Pownall

Personal details
- Born: 24 December 1724 St Martin-in-the-Fields, City of Westminster, England
- Died: 14 September 1808 (aged 83)
- Resting place: St John the Baptist Churchyard, Hagley, England
- Spouse(s): Martha Macartney; Caroline Bristow
- Children: 5, including: George Lyttelton, 2nd Baron Lyttelton; William Lyttelton, 3rd Baron Lyttelton
- Parent(s): Sir Thomas Lyttelton, 4th Baronet; Christian Temple

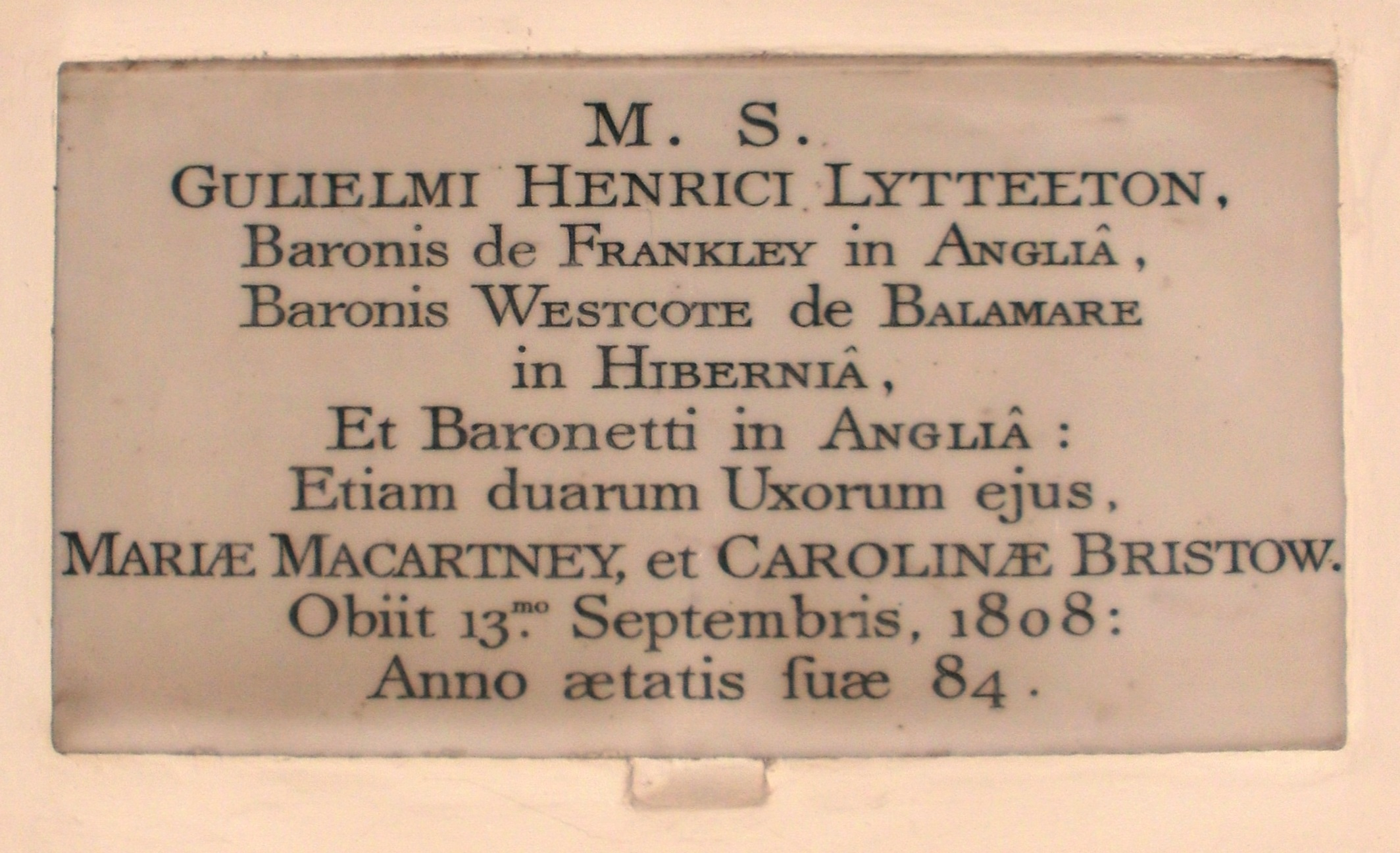
St John the Baptist Church, Hagley, memorial to William Lyttelton, 1st Baron Lyttelton (1724–1808)

William Henry Lyttelton, 1st Baron Lyttelton MP (24 December 1724 – 14 September 1808) was a British politician and colonial administrator from the Lyttelton family. He was the youngest son of Sir Thomas Lyttelton, 4th Baronet.

== Biography ==
As the youngest son, he did not expect to inherit the family estates. He made a career by serving in various government appointments. He became royal governor of colonial South Carolina in 1755, serving until 5 April 1760, during the period of the French and Indian War. This was the North American front of the Seven Years' War in Europe. He gained an alliance with the Cherokee and made a treaty with those in his territory. His insistence on respecting the treaty rights of native peoples aggravated settlers on the frontier of South Carolina, who were encroaching on their territories.

In 1760, Lyttelton was appointed Governor of Jamaica, but he was recalled to England after he lost a standoff with the Jamaican House of the Assembly, and its leader, Nicholas Bourke, over who should stand costs for the island's defence. He was appointed envoy-extraordinary to Portugal in 1766. He was raised to the Irish peerage in 1776 as Baron Westcote.

As a result of the death without issue of his nephew Thomas Lyttelton, 2nd Baron Lyttelton in 1779, William Lyttelton inherited the family baronetcy (see Lyttelton Baronets) and family estates in Frankley, Halesowen, and Hagley, including Hagley Hall. However, the estates in Upper Arley passed to the late lord's sister Lucy, wife of Arthur Annesley, 1st Earl of Mountnorris.

In 1794, Lord Westcote was also created Baron Lyttelton in the Peerage of Great Britain. He married twice. His first wife was Martha, daughter and coheir of James Macartney of Longford and his wife; Macartney was the nephew and coheir of Ambrose Aungier, 2nd Earl of Longford. They had three children before Martha's death, including George Fulke, his successor. His second wife was Caroline Bristow, daughter of John Bristow, MP and merchant, and his wife. They had two children together, including William Henry Lyttelton, 3rd Baron Lyttelton.

Government offices
Preceded by James Glen	Colonial Governor of South Carolina; 1756–1760	Succeeded by Thomas Pownall
Preceded by Henry Moore (acting)	Governor of Jamaica; 1762–1766	Succeeded by Roger Hope Elletson
Diplomatic posts
Preceded by Unknown	Envoy to Portugal; 1766–1770	Succeeded by Hon. Robert Walpole
Parliament of Great Britain
Preceded by William Bowles	Member of Parliament for Bewdley; 1748–1755	Succeeded by William Finch
Preceded by Sir Edward Winnington, Bt	Member of Parliament for Bewdley; 1774–1790	Succeeded by George Fulke Lyttelton
Peerage of Great Britain
New creation	Baron Lyttelton; 1794–1808	Succeeded by George Fulke Lyttelton
Peerage of Ireland
New creation	Baron Westcote; 1776–1808	Succeeded by George Fulke Lyttelton
Baronetage of England
Preceded by Thomas Lyttelton	Baronet (of Frankley); 1779–1808	Succeeded by George Fulke Lyttelton
