= Thomas Lyttelton =

Thomas Lyttelton may refer to:

- Sir Thomas Lyttelton, 1st Baronet (1593–1650), English Royalist officer and politician
- Sir Thomas Lyttelton, 4th Baronet (1686–1751), MP for Worcestershire 1721–1734; Camelford 1734–1741; Lord of the Admiralty
- Thomas Lyttelton, 2nd Baron Lyttelton (1744–1779), British MP for Bewdley, 1768 and profligate, dubbed "the wicked Lord Lyttelton" and "bad Lord Lyttelton"
- Thomas Lyttelton (MP for Coventry), MP for Coventry, 1540
- Thomas Lyttelton, 3rd Viscount Chandos (born 1953), British politician for the Labour Party

== See also ==
- Thomas Littleton (disambiguation)
