= Hagley Hall =

Historic house in Hagley, Worcestershire, England

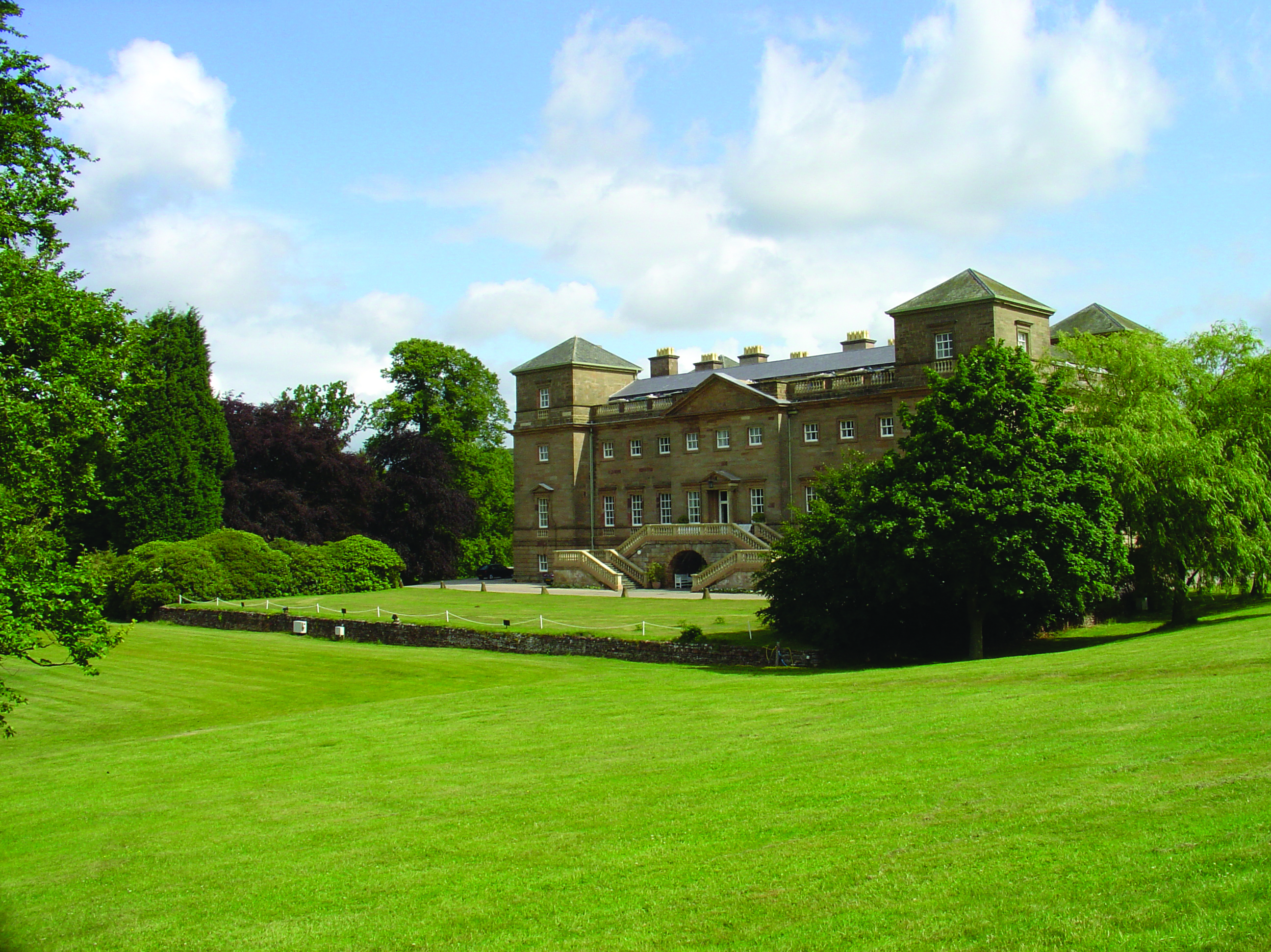
- Hagley Hall June 2011

General information
- Architectural style: Neo-Palladian
- Location: Hall Drive, Hagley, Worcestershire, DY9 9LG, Hagley, Worcestershire, England
- Coordinates: 52.4242°N 2.1191°W
- Construction started: 1754
- Completed: 1760
- Client: George Lyttelton, 1st Baron Lyttelton

Design and construction
- Architect: Sanderson Miller

Hagley Hall is a Grade I listed 18th-century house in Hagley, Worcestershire, the home of the Lyttelton family. It was the creation of George, 1st Lord Lyttelton (1709–1773), secretary to Frederick, Prince of Wales, poet and man of letters and briefly Chancellor of the Exchequer. Before the death of his father (Sir Thomas Lyttelton) in 1751, he began to landscape the grounds in the new Picturesque style, and between 1754 and 1760 it was he who was responsible for the building of the Neo-Palladian house that survives to this day.

After a fire in 1925, most of the house was restored, but the uppermost floor of the servants' quarters was not, which means that the present roof line between the towers is lower than it was when first constructed.

The estate fell into disrepair and incurred a mounting debt beginning in the 1970s. The 11th Viscount Cobham was forced to sell off large tracts of estate land to keep it afloat (in addition to paying for his high-profile divorce). His brother and successor Christopher Lyttelton, 12th Viscount Cobham began restoration works in both the main house and the park. The park is open to the public and part of the house is available as a venue for hire.

As of 2012, the hall is the family home to the 12th Viscount Cobham and his wife Tessa.

== House ==
The fashion for Neo-Palladian houses had started in London between 1715 and 1720. It spread out to the provinces and did not reach Worcestershire until the 1750s. The two finest examples of this style in Worcestershire were Croome Court built between 1751 and 1752 and Hagley Hall designed by Sanderson Miller (with the assistance of the London architect John Sanderson) between 1754 and 1760. Notable Neo-Palladian features incorporated into Hagley Hall include the plain exterior and the corner towers with pyramidal roofs (a feature first used by Inigo Jones in the design of Wilton House in Wiltshire), and of Venetian windows. The house contains a fine example of Rococo plasterwork by Francesco Vassali and a unique collection of 18th-century Chippendale furniture and family portraits, including works by van Dyck, Joshua Reynolds, Cornelius Johnson, and Peter Lely. A catalogue of the collection was published in 1900.

On Christmas Eve 1925, a disastrous fire swept through the house destroying much of the Library and many of the pictures. Despite boiling lead pouring from the roof through the house, all those within managed to escape. At the height of the blaze when nothing more could be salvaged from inside, the 9th Viscount was heard to mutter "my life's work [is] destroyed". He and his wife painstakingly restored the house, except for the staff quarters on the top floor.

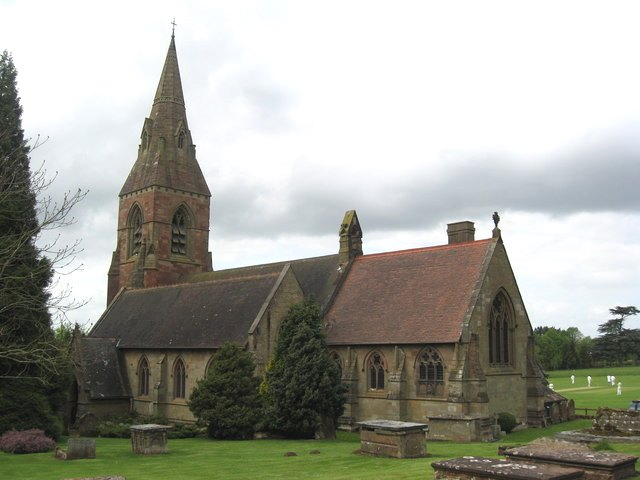
St John the Baptist Church, Hagley

To the north of the Hall, and separated from it only by the narrow Hall Drive, is the extensive stable block. The buildings are grouped around two courtyards. The stable block no longer serves its original purpose, but is now operated as a business park for small local businesses.

A short walk to the west of the Hall, facing its rear façade, is the parish church of St John the Baptist, and its surrounding churchyard. With two earlier exceptions, members of the Lyttelton family, owners of Hagley Hall and their relatives, have only been buried in the churchyard since 1875; also there are the owners of other large houses and estates in the area, and their servants as well. Immediately adjacent to the church is the local cricket ground with its separate clubhouse. Hagley Cricket Club, first formed in 1834, was for long associated with the Lyttelton family.

== Grounds ==
Hagley House is set in 350 acres (1.4 km^{2}) of landscaped deer park grazed by herds of fallow deer. The grounds were landscaped between about 1739 and 1764, with follies designed by John Pitt (of Encombe), Thomas Pitt, James "Athenian" Stuart, and Sanderson Miller. The follies include the Hagley Obelisk, built in 1764 for Sir Richard Lyttelton, which is visible for many miles. The nearby reconstruction of the Temple of Theseus, built between 1759 and 1762, was a gift from Admiral Smith, Lyttelton's half-brother. This is currently in poor condition and has been listed on Historic England's Heritage at Risk Register for some years. Others in the main park included some more classical erections and a sham ruined castle in mediaeval style.

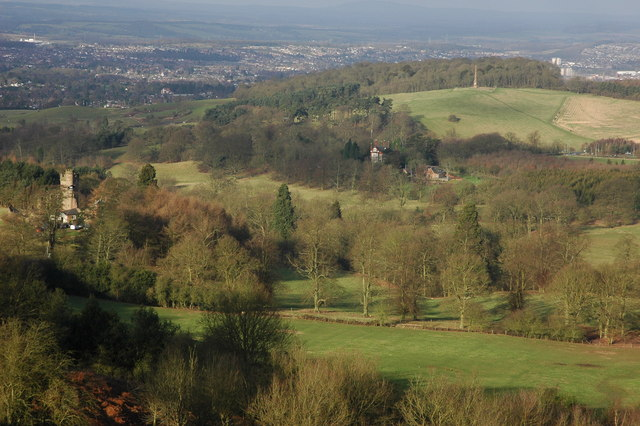
Hagley Park in the foreground, with the Hagley Obelisk on Wychbury Hill in the middle-ground, viewed from the neighbouring Clent Hills

The grounds drew many admiring visitors, including other writers interested in landscaping such as Alexander Pope and William Shenstone, to both of whom monuments were later erected in the park. James Thomson was another commemorated visitor, who included a description of the grounds in the Spring section of The Seasons, which he revised following his first visit to Hagley in 1743.

Although the gardening poet William Mason did not consider Hagley by name in "The English Garden", there is a section dedicated to it in his earlier "Ode to a water nymph" (1758) which does. Horace Walpole, notoriously hard to please, wrote after a visit in 1753: "I wore out my eyes with gazing, my feet with climbing, and my tongue and vocabulary with commending."

In April 1786 American Founding Fathers John Adams and Thomas Jefferson visited Hagley and other notable houses in the area, Adams wrote in his diary that "Stowe, Hagley, and Blenheim, are superb; Woburn, Caversham, and the Leasowes are beautiful. Wotton is both great and elegant, though neglected." Though damning about the means used to finance these estates, he was particularly enamoured with Hagley, although he did not think that such embellishments would suit the more rugged American countryside.

After many decades of neglect, restoration work has begun in the grounds, starting with the Hagley Obelisk on Wychbury Hill in 2010. Recently the Palladian Bridge was rebuilt and the vista opened up the valley to the repaired Rotunda at its head.

== Gunpowder Plot ==
Fifty years before the construction of the Palladian mansion and just after the Gunpowder Plot was discovered, two of the conspirators, Robert Wintour and Stephen Littleton, escaped arrest at Holbeche House and travelled south to ask Humphrey Littleton for his assistance. At the time Meriel Littleton, the widow of John Lyttelton who had died in prison, lived at Hagley Park. However, Humphrey had the use of the house.

They were captured at Hagley Park on 9 January 1606 because the authorities had been informed of their presence by Littleton's cook – John Fynwood. He had been alarmed by the quantity of food that was being consumed by Littleton and had seen Robert and Stephen. Despite Littleton's protests that he was not harbouring anyone, a search was made and another servant, David Bate, showed where the two plotters were escaping from a courtyard into the countryside.

== Miscellaneous ==
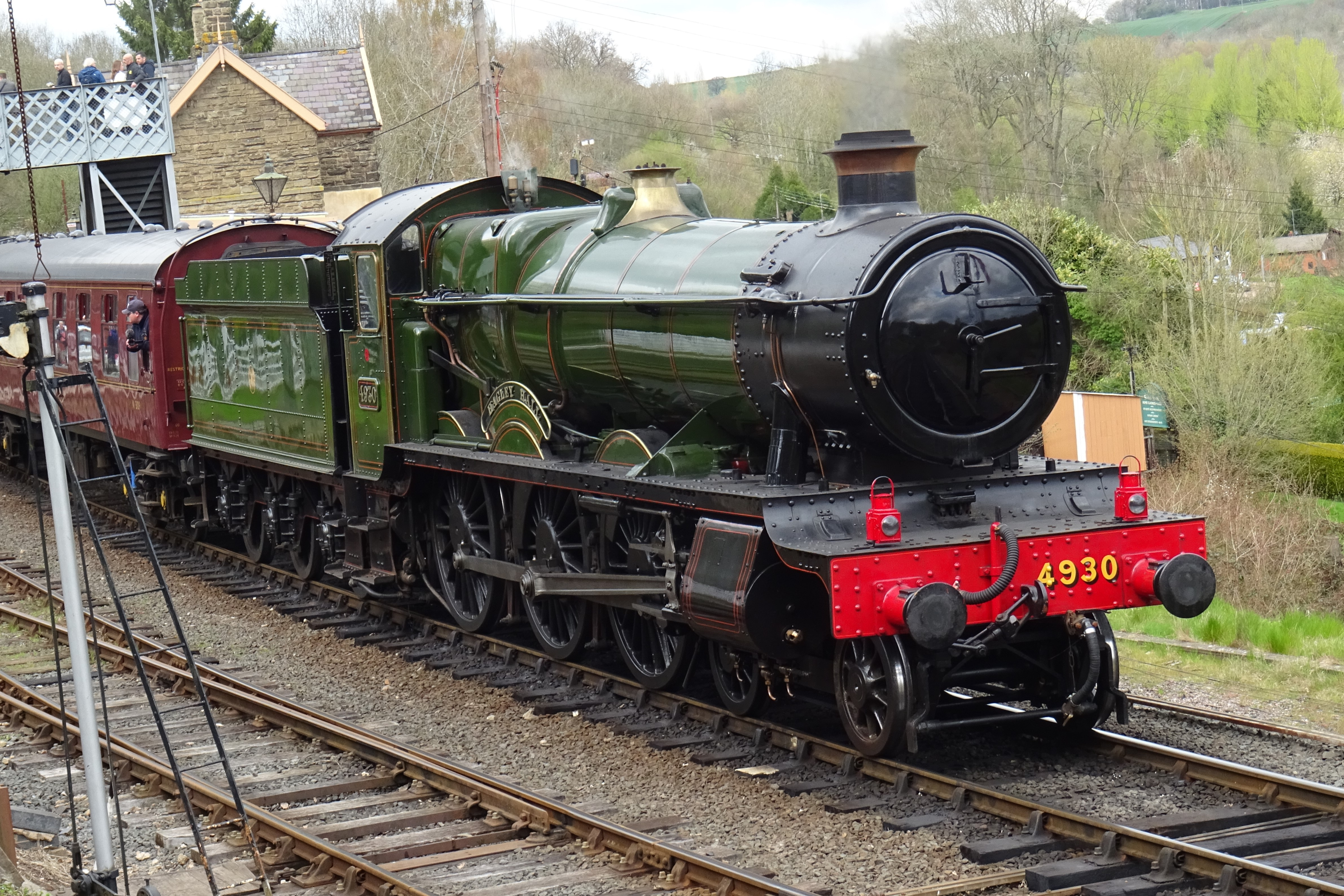
4930 Hagley Hall on the SVR in April 2023.

A 19th-century account of the house and park and the Lyttelton Family ghost story is available.

In 1780, after the death of Thomas Lyttelton, 2nd Baron Lyttelton, Hagley Hall was leased to Bernard Dewes, later of Wellesbourne, Warwickshire, until 1793.

The Great Western Railway built a series of 4-6-0 steam locomotives named after various halls. Locomotive 4930 was named Hagley Hall and is preserved on the nearby Severn Valley Railway. On its way for refurbishment in June 2007, it was transported to visit the Hall after which it is named and parked on the forecourt there.
