= Wychbury Ring =

Hillfort in England

- Location within West Midlands county

General information
- Type: Hill fort
- Location: Hagley, England
- Coordinates: 52.43322°N 2.11909°W
- Construction started: Iron Age

Technical details
- Size: 7.5 acres (3.0 ha)

Wychbury Ring is an Iron Age hill fort located on Wychbury Hill, near Hagley, Stourbridge, on the border of West Midlands and Worcestershire in the English Midlands.

== Description ==
The fort measures 250 m (820 ft) from east to west and 150 m (490 ft) from north to south, covering an area of 7.25 acres (2.93 ha). It has two sets of ramparts and ditches. The inner rampart is between 16 m (52 ft) and 20 m (66 ft) wide, rising up to 2.6 m (8 ft 6 in) in height, with the surrounding inner ditch 10 m (33 ft) wide and up to 1.7 m (5 ft 7 in) deep. The outer rampart is 10 m (33 ft) wide and up to 3 m (9.8 ft) in height, with the outer ditch being 10 m (33 ft) wide and up to 1.2 m (3 ft 11 in) deep. There are fortified entrances at the east and south west.

Small bronze rings, including an Iron Age terret, were found in the fort in 1884, and Roman coins and masonry have been found nearby, suggesting a possible site of a later Roman Villa. Investigations in 1924 reported a 5.5-acre (22,000 m^{2}) annexe to the south and a nearby Iron Age field system, but no trace of either remain.

== Images ==
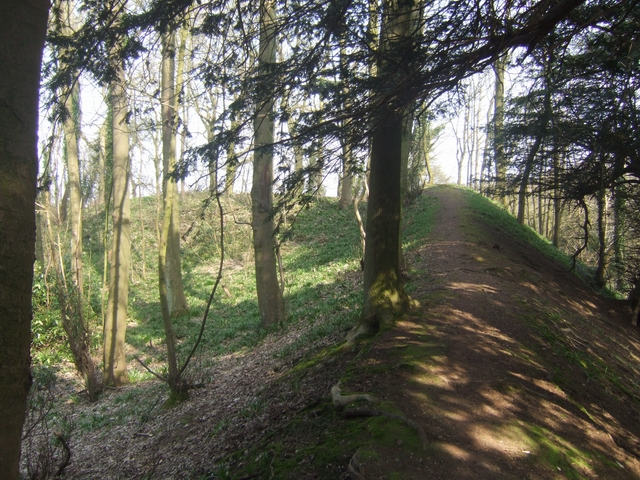
Eastern end

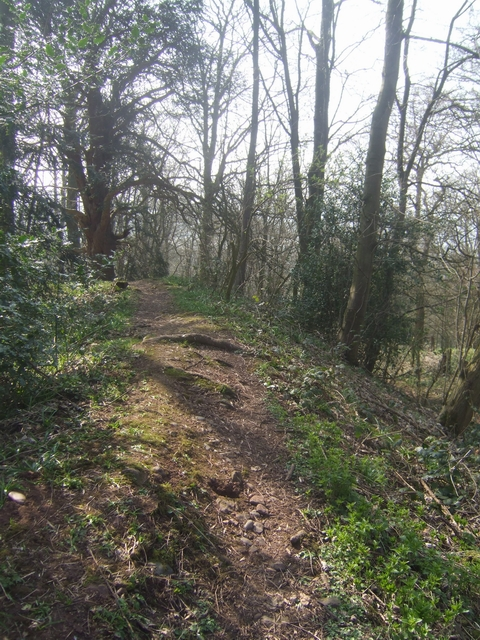
Southern rampart
