= Thomas Littleton =

Thomas Littleton may refer to:

- Sir Thomas Littleton, 3rd Baronet (1647–1709), British statesman
- Sir Thomas Littleton, 2nd Baronet (c. 1621–1681), English MP
- Thomas de Littleton (c. 1407–1481), English judge and legal writer

== See also ==
- Thomas Lyttelton (disambiguation)
