= Castle in Hagley Park =

Folly castle in Worcestershire, England

Coordinates: 52°25′25″N 2°06′21″W

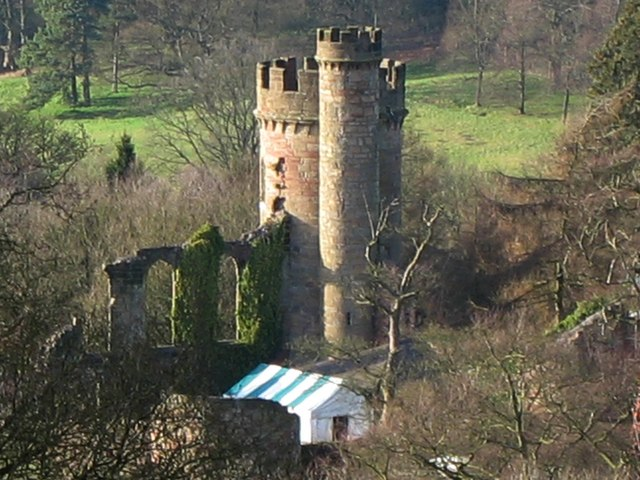
Photograph of the mock castle in Hagley Hall park by Paul Brooker.

The folly castle in the park of Hagley Hall is a Grade II* listed building and the largest building in Hagley Park. It was designed by Sanderson Miller for George Lyllelton in the middle of the 18th century to look like a small ruined medieval castle. (Note: Some sources call the folly "Hagley Castle", but other sources use descriptions such as "the mock castle in Hagley Park". The descriptive name given to it by English Heritage is "The Castle about ¾ mile east of Hagley Hall".)

== Eighteenth century ==
The building of the castle (and another folly called the rotunda) was started in 1747 while Sir Thomas Lyttelton was still alive, but the credit for its creation is usually given to his son and heir George Lyttelton (the future 1st Lord Lyttelton).

The Gothic Revival castle is rectangular with a round tower at each corner. Only the tower in the north-west is complete to a height of four storeys and an attached adjoining taller stair turret both topped with battlements. The top floor of the completed tower has large pointed windows, it has a "domed ceiling with Gothic plaster decoration, cusped pointed niches alternating with the windows and above the door is a quatrefoil containing a coat of arms". The floors below have smaller rectangular and Lancet windows (some of them cusped).

The other towers are one or two storeys high with small rectangular windows and built to look as if they are ruined, (this effect was achieved by building the parts of the walls furthers from the castle's bailey higher than those closest allowing sloped roofs invisible to an observer outside the bailey).

The curtain walls are also built to look as if they are ruins. The west wall is the most complete with three tall windows two of which are complete enough to contain Gothic arches. Below the middle window is a Gothic arched doorway which are three shield reliefs.

The towers and curtain walls are faced with sandstone some of which may well have been taken from the ruins of Halesowen Abbey.

== Nineteenth century ==
In the nineteenth century a single story building with a hipped slate roof was built next to the north-west tower. On the south side the entrance is through a gabled rustic timber porch; to its right there is a three-light casement window with four-centered head and latticed lights.

== See also ==
- Clent Castle, another folly castle close to this one.
