= Cofton Hall =

Country house in Worcestershire, England

Coordinates: 52.3732°N 1.9865°W

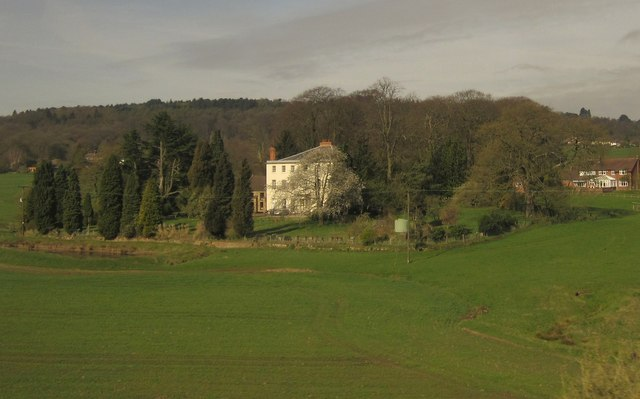
Cofton Hall

Cofton Hall is a country house on the Lickey Hills near Cofton Hackett, in the Bromsgrove District of north east Worcestershire, England. It is a Grade II* listed building.

Most of the original 14th-century building has been destroyed, by a deliberate fire during the English Civil War after a visit by King Charles I; however, the hall with a hammer-beam roof survives. The rest of the building was constructed in the 18th century.

== History ==
The 14th-century hall was originally a timber-framed house. The stone walls were added in the Victorian era.

King Charles I stayed at the hall on the night of 14 May 1645 as guest of the owner, Thomas Jolliffe, during the English Civil War. The following day, before marching to Chester on 15 May, the Royalist soldiers set the hall ablaze to prevent it falling into the hands of the Parliamentarian Army. Only the great hall survived.

== Architecture ==
The three-storey six-bay building has a tiled roof. The entrance has a portico with two doric columns. The west wing encloses the hall with a hammer-beam roof. The old hall is 38 feet (12 m) long and 21 feet (6.4 m) wide. The roof has nine hammer-beams with spandrel brackets. These rest on octagonal corbels of wood. Each side of the roof has three compartments divided by purlins.

Beneath the house, and extending beyond their walls are a series of corridors and chambers, totalling more than 200 feet (61 m). This includes a series of "streams", one brick wide and one brick high, which provide a cooling system to three of the chambers. These drain into a sump about 100 yards (91 m) from the house.

The area around the house are the remains of the foundations of older buildings.
