= St Leonard's Church, Frankley =

St Leonard’s Church, Frankley
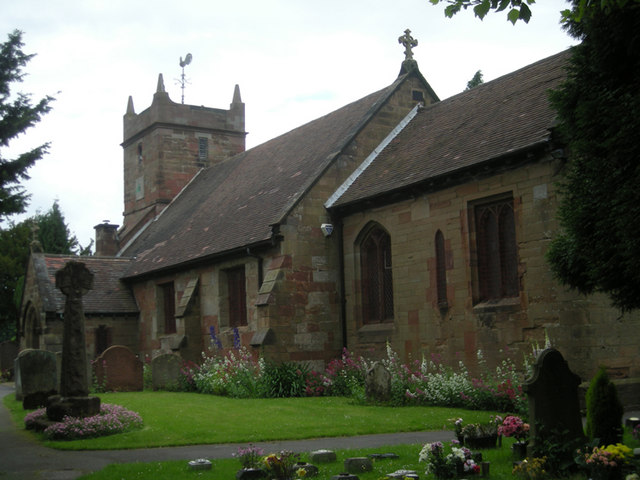
- St Leonard’s Church, Frankley
- St Leonard’s Church, Frankley
- 52°25′17.8″N 2°0′10.43″W
- Location: Frankley
- Country: England
- Denomination: Church of England

Administration
- Diocese: Anglican Diocese of Birmingham
- Archdeaconry: Birmingham
- Deanery: Kings Norton
- Parish: Frankley

St Leonard's Church, Frankley is a Grade II* listed parish church in the Church of England in Frankley, Worcestershire.

== History ==
The church dates from the 15th century. It was altered around 1751 when the wooden tower was rebuilt in stone, restored in 1873 and there were other alterations and additions 1931 – 1932 by Bateman. There was another restoration in 1947 following a fire.

The tower main arch has a hood mould with head stops depicting King George V and Queen Mary.

The building is constructed from sandstone in a red and grey colour, until 1965 the tower contained two bells. A new church hall was constructed in 2005.

== Organ ==
The organ dates from 1884 by J. W. Walker & Sons Ltd. It was modified by Walter James Bird and Son in 1933. A specification of the organ can be found on the National Pipe Organ Register.
