= George Lyttelton, 1st Baron Lyttelton =

British politician and writer (1709–1773)

The Right Honourable The Lord Lyttelton PC
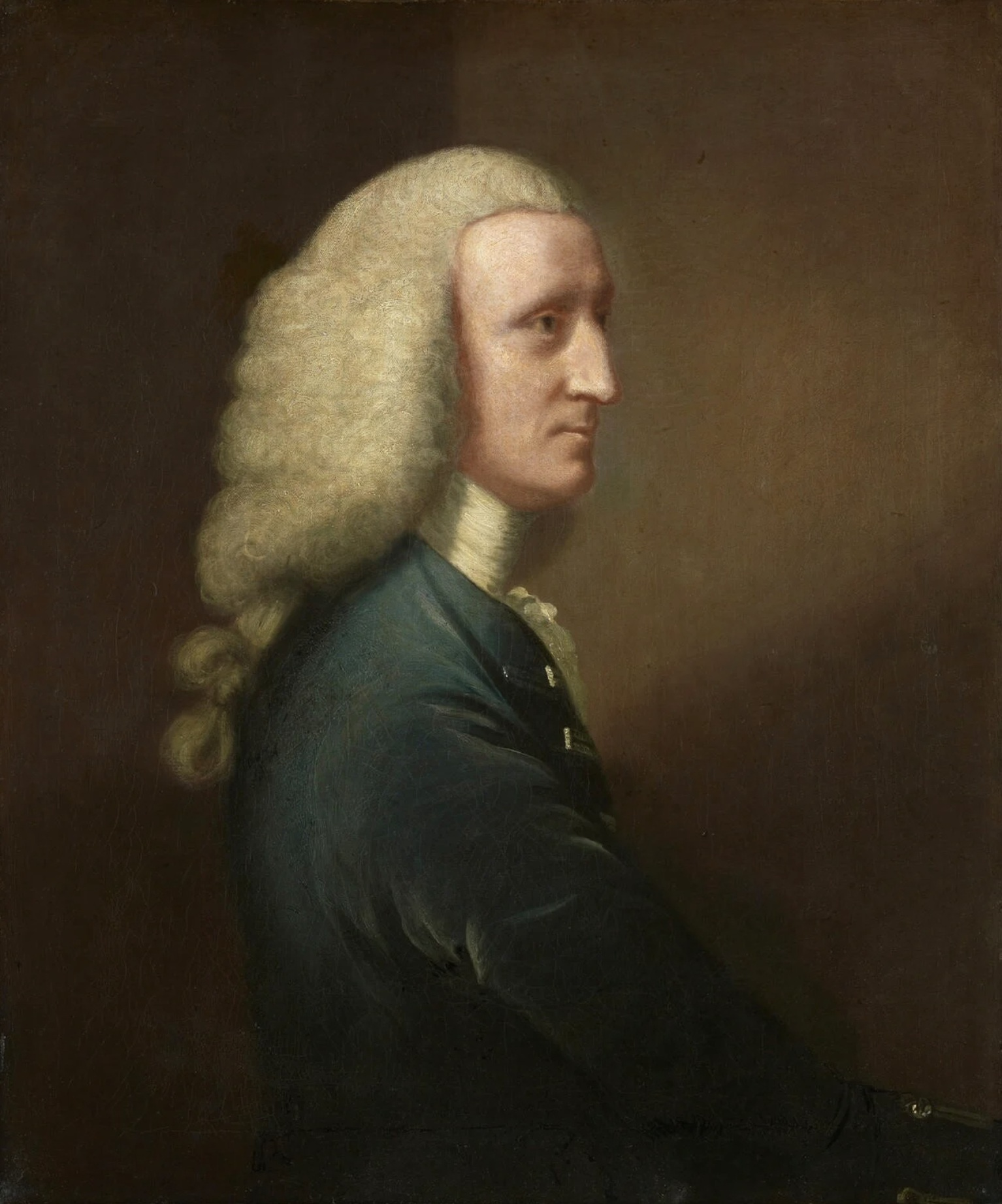
- c. 1756 portrait

Chancellor of the Exchequer
- In office 25 November 1755 – 16 November 1756
- Monarch: George II
- Prime Minister: The Duke of Newcastle
- Preceded by: Henry Bilson-Legge
- Succeeded by: Henry Bilson-Legge

Personal details
- Born: 17 January 1709 Hagley, Worcestershire
- Died: 22 August 1773 (aged 64) Hagley, Worcestershire
- Party: Whig
- Spouses: Lucy Fortescue (m. 1742; died 1747) Elizabeth Rich (m. 1749)
- Education: Eton College
- Alma mater: Christ Church, Oxford

George Lyttelton, 1st Baron Lyttelton, PC (17 January 1709 – 22 August 1773), known between 1751 and 1756 as Sir George Lyttelton, 5th Baronet, was a British politician and writer who served as Chancellor of the Exchequer from 1755 to 1756. As an author himself, he was also a supporter of other writers and as a patron of the arts made an important contribution to the development of 18th-century landscape design.

== Life ==
Lord Lyttelton was the eldest son of Sir Thomas Lyttelton, 4th Baronet, of Frankley, in the County of Worcester, by his wife Christian, daughter of Sir Richard Temple, 3rd Baronet. Educated at Eton and Christ Church, Oxford, he afterwards went on grand tour, visiting Europe with his tutor. It was during this time that he started publishing his early works in both poetry and prose. Even after he was elected to Parliament in 1735, he continued to publish from time to time. In 1742 he married Lucy, daughter of Hugh Fortescue, and following her death in 1747 he later married Elizabeth, daughter of Field Marshal Sir Robert Rich, 4th Baronet, in 1749. He died in August 1773, aged 64, and was succeeded as baron by his eldest son, Thomas. Though Samuel Johnson's biographical notice of Lyttelton is characterised by a conspicuous show of dislike, it diverges at the end into a long description of his exemplary death and the plain inscription he asked to have added to his first wife's monument in St John the Baptist Church, Hagley.

== Political career ==
Lyttelton was Member of Parliament (MP) for Okehampton from 1735 to 1756 and, as one of Cobham's Cubs during the 1730s, opposed the Prime Minister Robert Walpole. He served as secretary to Frederick, Prince of Wales from 1737, and then, after Walpole's fall, as a Commissioner of the Treasury in 1744. That year too he was elected a Fellow of the Royal Society. Lyttelton was made a Privy Councillor in 1754 and in the following year became briefly Chancellor of the Exchequer, but performed poorly in that role. In 1756 he was raised to the peerage as Lord Lyttelton, Baron of Frankley in the County of Worcester, and continued to speak in the House of Lords until the year before he died.

Lyttelton was later described as "an amiable, absent-minded man, of unimpeachable integrity and benevolent character, with strong religious convictions and respectable talents", but ultimately as "a poor practical politician". His political opponent Lord Hervey spitefully characterised his performance as a speaker as "a great flow of words that were always uttered in a lulling monotony, and the little meaning they had to boast of was generally borrowed from the commonplace maxims and sentiments of moralists, philosophers, patriots, and poets, crudely imbibed, half digested, ill put together, and confusedly refunded".

== Poetry and patronage ==
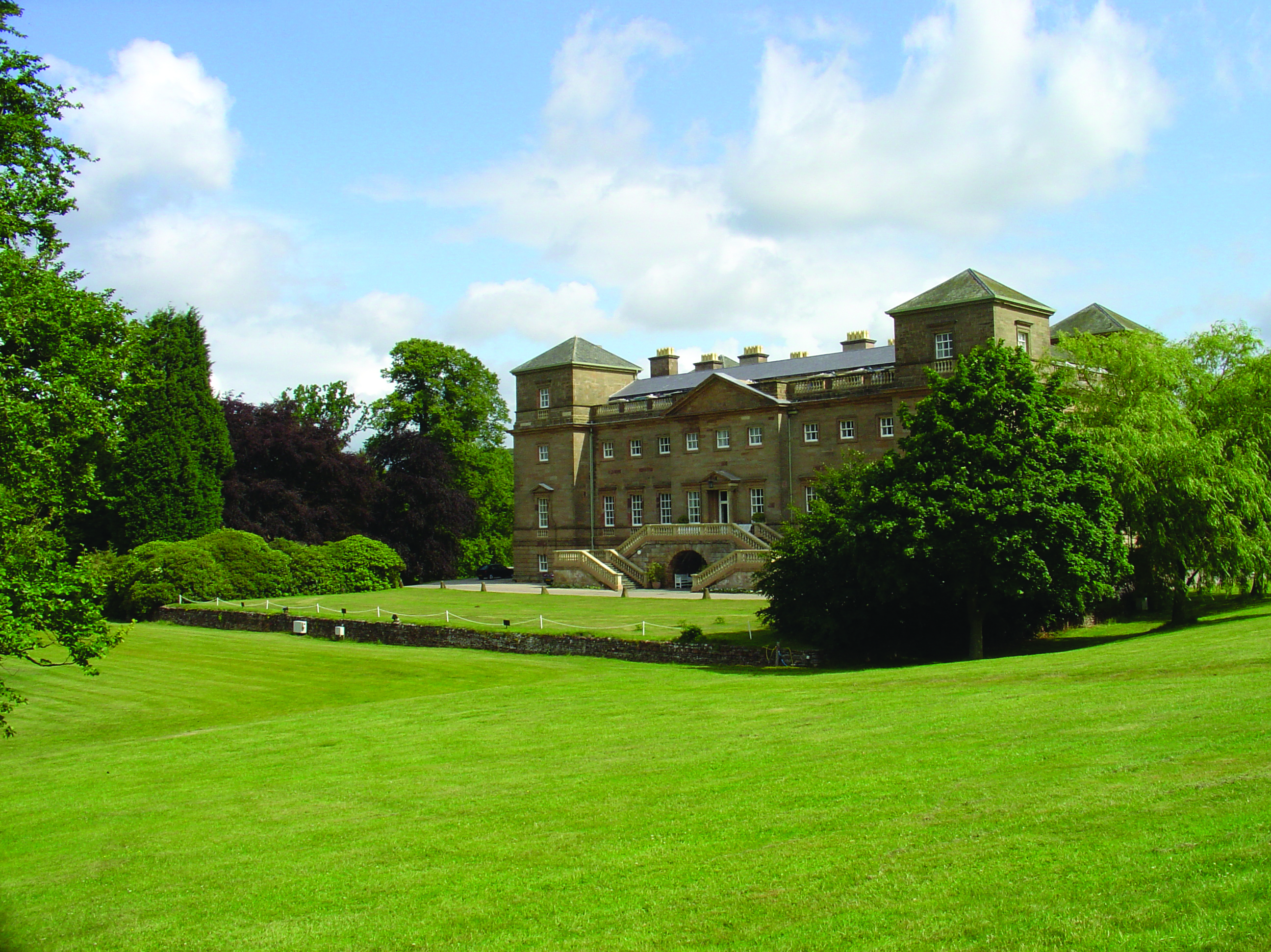
Hagley Hall

Lord Lyttelton was a friend and supporter of Alexander Pope in the 1730s and of Henry Fielding in the 1750s; the latter dedicated his novel Tom Jones to Lyttelton. He had written his "Epistle to Mr. Pope, from a young gentleman at Rome" while still on the European tour, advising him to abandon satire for a patriotic theme more worthy of his greatness. Later on the poem was used to preface editions of Pope's work.

Throughout his life, he acted as a friendly patron of poets. James Thomson, for whom Lyttelton eventually arranged a pension, was a frequent visitor to Hagley Hall. Joseph Warton he appointed his domestic chaplain and it was at his suggestion that David Mallet was made undersecretary to the Prince of Wales.

Lyttelton's own poetic reputation was guaranteed continuity by his work being included in the collection of English poets prefaced by Johnson's Lives. Variously annotated and augmented, the collection appeared in succeeding editions into the start of the 19th century. The monody "To the Memory of a Lady lately Deceased", written on the death of his first wife, had an even longer lasting reputation. Though Thomas Gray found "parts of it too stiff and poetical", he especially praised the fourth stanza as "truly tender and elegiac". The poem was alluded to or parodied by others well into the 19th century, particularly the invocation of the "shades of Hagley" in the fifth stanza. Anna Seward, in answer to a correspondent who preferred Lyttelton's ode to the newly fashionable sonnet, ingeniously rearranged the lines of the poem into a series of sonnets, in which the "shades of Hagley" passage headed the second. And William Gladstone acknowledged that his Church Principles was "completed beneath the shades of Hagley" as late as 1840.

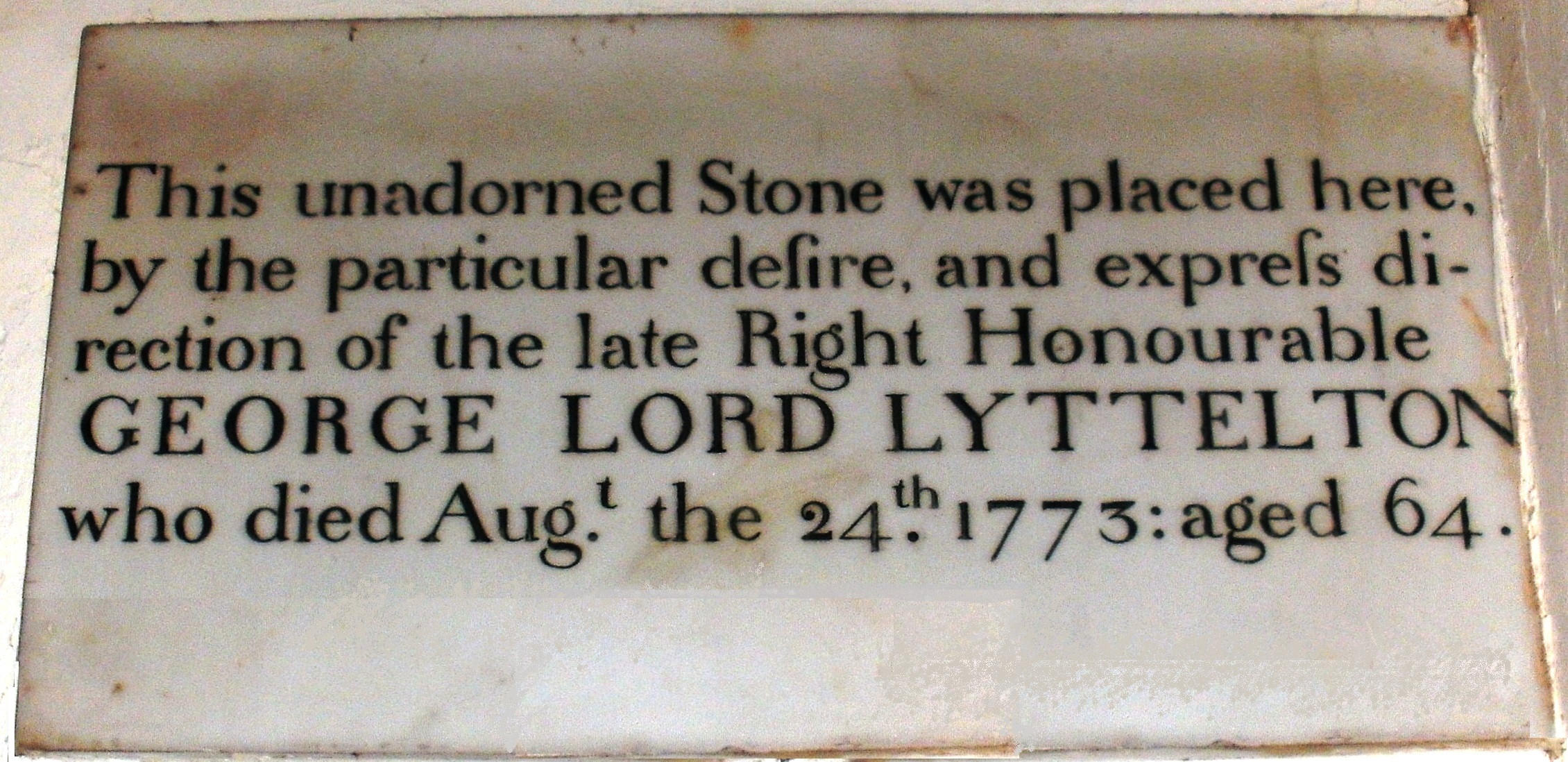
The plain memorial to Lord Lyttelton in St John the Baptist Church, Hagley

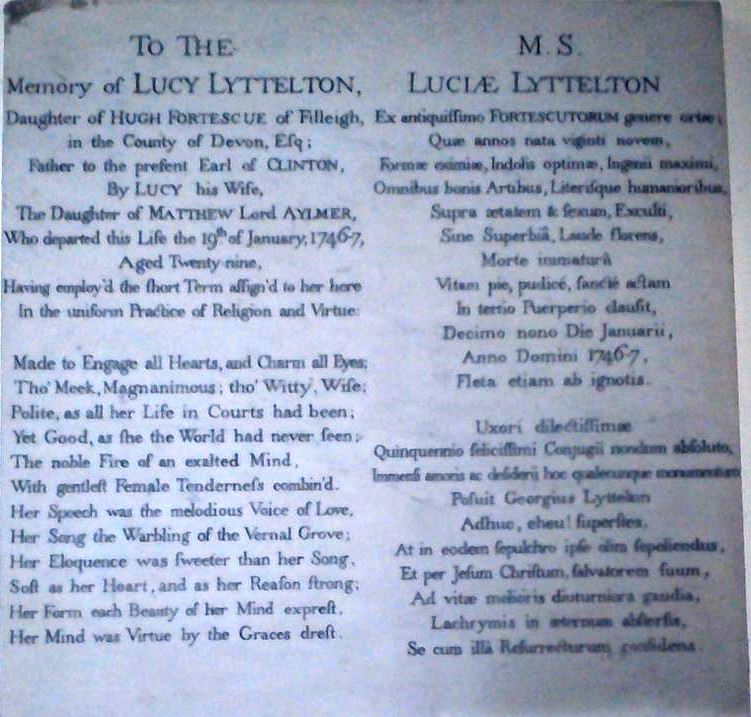
Memorial inscription to Lucy Lyttelton, with her husband's poetical tribute, 1747

Despite his long political career, it was as a poet that Lyttelton was chiefly remembered in the 19th century. But he was author also of many works in prose, chiefly historical and theological. Two, however, are distinguished by their humour. Letters from a Persian in England, to his Friend at Ispahan (1735) ironically comments on the idiosyncrasies of the time from the naïve point of view of an outsider. On attending a wedding ceremony in "one of their Mosques", for example, the visitor remarks that "Marriage here is esteemed a Religious Ceremony, and that I believe is one Reason among others why so little Regard is paid to it". Oliver Goldsmith was later to borrow the same approach for his Chinese philosopher in Letters from a Citizen of the World to his Friends in the East (1760). There were, nevertheless, French models for both in the Lettres Persanes of Montesquieu (1721) and the Lettres Chinoises (1735) of Jean-Baptiste de Boyer, Marquis d'Argens, both of which had been translated soon after into English.

Another work with prior French counterparts was Lyttelton's Dialogues of the Dead (1760). Though these had Classical precedents, the more immediate models were François Fénelon's Dialogues des morts anciens et modernes and Bernard Le Bovier de Fontenelle's Nouveaux Dialogues des morts, which had also appeared in popular English translations as Dialogues of the Dead. The themes treated in Lyttelton's are political, literary and philosophical, although the characters sometimes stray from their expected role. Joseph Addison and Jonathan Swift's conversation is of politics, while Charles XII of Sweden proposes to Alexander the Great an alliance against Alexander Pope for insulting them both in a satire. Included among these conversations were three that Lyttleton had encouraged the bluestocking leader Elizabeth Montagu to write (Dialogues 26–8).

All of Lyttelton's writing was collected shortly after his death by his nephew, G. E. Ayscough. In 1791 an edition of his poems appeared in Germany accompanied by J. G. Weigel's prose translations. During his lifetime Lyttelton's Observations on the Conversion and Apostleship of St. Paul was translated into French in 1750 by Jean Deschamps (1707–67) and again in 1754 by the Abbé Antoine Guénée (1717–1803); his Dialogues of the Dead was also translated into French in 1760 as Dialogues des morts by Élie de Joncourt (1697–1765) and Jean Deschamps.

== Hagley Hall and grounds ==
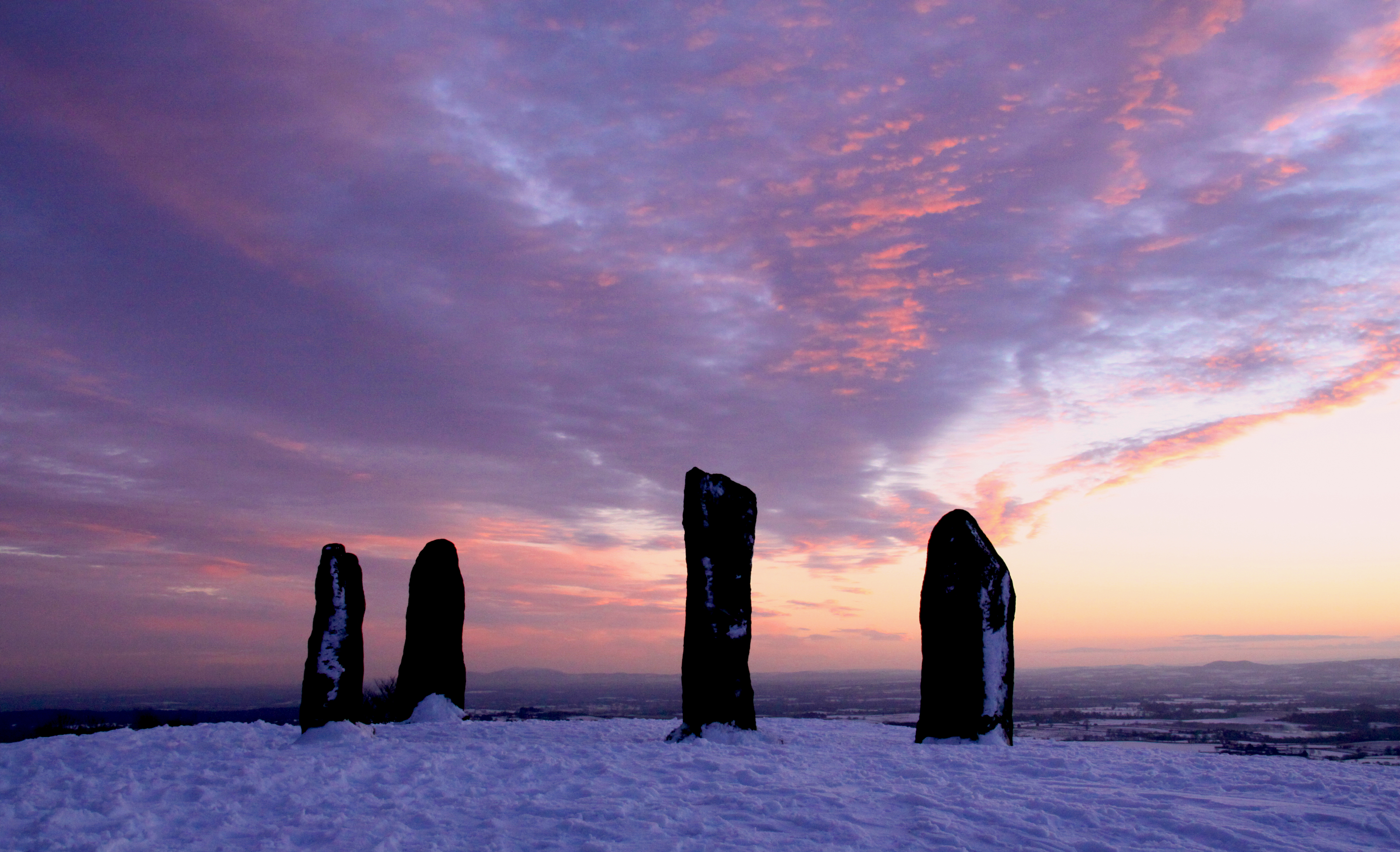
Ossian memorial, Clent Hill

Lyttelton spent many years and a fortune developing Hagley Hall and its park, which contained many follies as well as memorials to the poets Milton, Pope, Thomson and the neighbouring landscaper William Shenstone. Also included among the latter was a 'druid's temple' of standing stones commemorating Ossian that Lyttelton had erected outside his grounds on nearby Clent Hill. The hall itself was designed by Sanderson Miller and is the last of the great Neo-Palladian houses to be built in England.

== Bibliography ==
- Burkes Peerage and Baronetage (1939), s.v. Cobham, Viscount
- Barker, George Fisher Russell (1893). "Lyttelton, George (1709-1773)" . In Lee, Sidney (ed.). Dictionary of National Biography. Vol. 34. London: Smith, Elder & Co.
- History of Parliament Online: “LYTTELTON, George (1709–73)”

Parliament of Great Britain
Preceded by William Northmore; Thomas Pitt of Boconnoc	Member of Parliament for Okehampton; 1735 – 1756; With: Thomas Pitt of Boconnoc to 1754; Robert Vyner from 1754	Succeeded by Robert Vyner; William Pitt (the Elder)
Political offices
Preceded by James Pelham	Secretary to Frederick, Prince of Wales; 1737–1744	Succeeded by Henry Drax
Preceded by The Earl of Lincoln	Cofferer of the Household; 1754–1756	Succeeded by The Duke of Leeds
Preceded by Henry Bilson-Legge	Chancellor of the Exchequer; 1755–1756	Succeeded by Henry Bilson-Legge
Peerage of Great Britain
New creation	Baron Lyttelton; 1756–1773	Succeeded by Thomas Lyttelton
Baronetage of England
Preceded by Thomas Lyttelton	Baronet (of Frankley); 1751–1773	Succeeded by Thomas Lyttelton
