= Thomas Lyttelton, 2nd Baron Lyttelton =

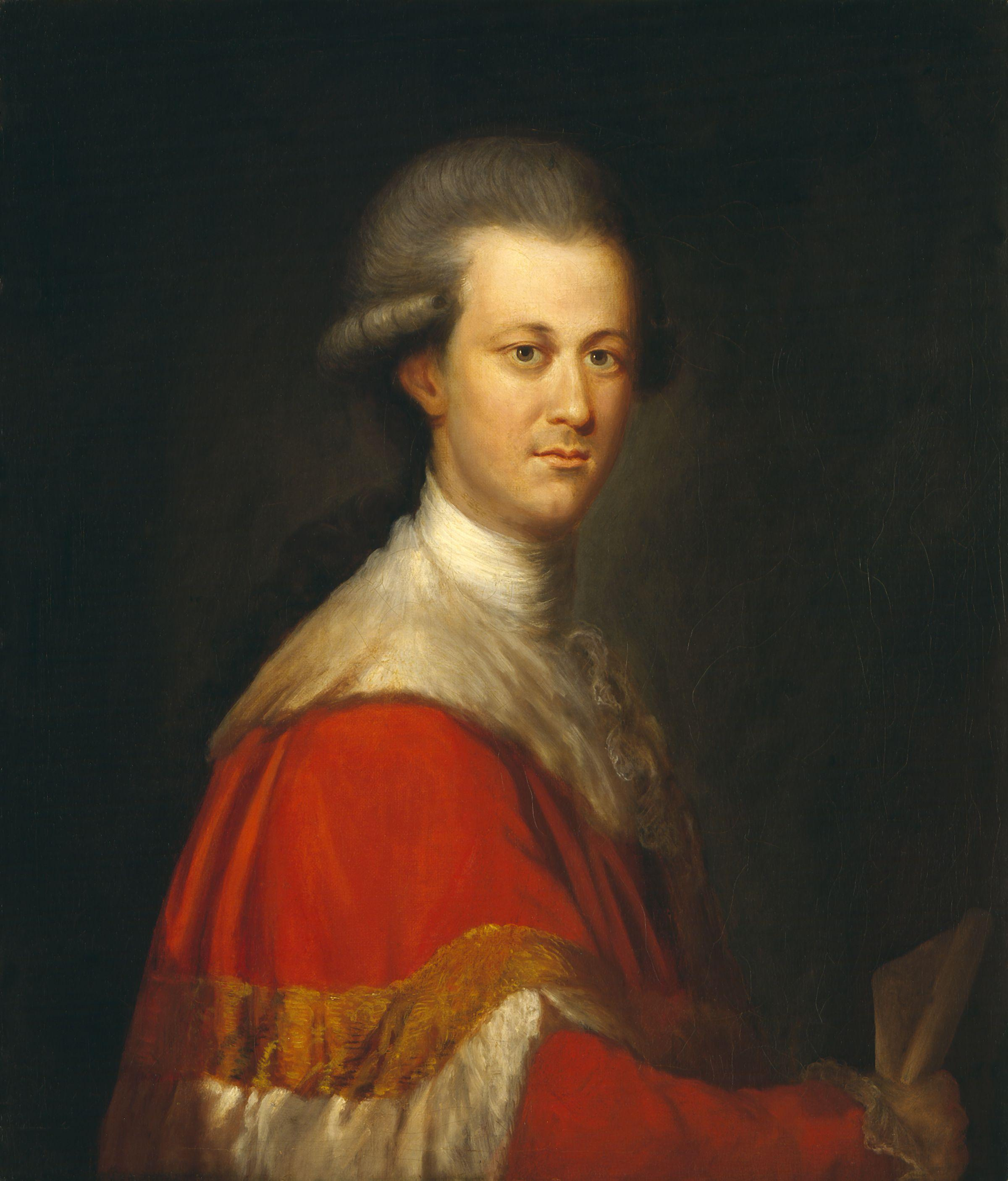
Lord Lyttelton, portrait by Richard Brompton.

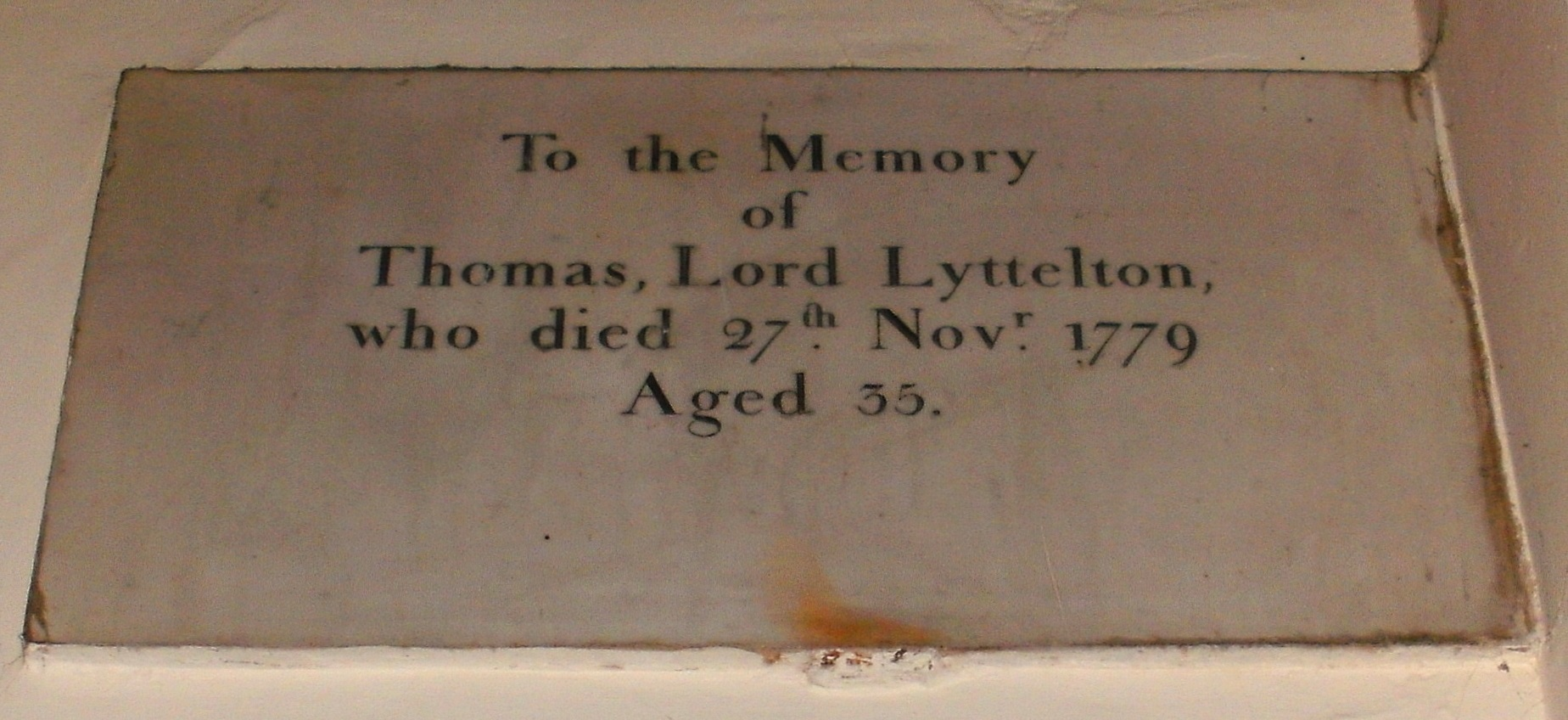
St John the Baptist Church, Hagley, memorial to Thomas Lyttelton, 2nd Baron Lyttelton (1744–1779)

Thomas Lyttelton, 2nd Baron Lyttelton (30 January 1744 – 27 November 1779) was an English MP and profligate from the Lyttelton family.

== Life ==
Sometimes dubbed "the wicked Lord Lyttelton" and "bad Lord Lyttelton", he was the son of George Lyttelton, 1st Baron Lyttelton and 5th Baronet, and his wife Lucy Fortescue. His mother died when he was two years old. He was talented in his early years, particularly in drawing. Educated at Eton and Christ Church, Oxford where he matriculated in 1761, he was also a reader of poetry, his favourite poet being John Milton.

His father, the 1st Lord Lyttelton, held political posts including Privy Councillor, a Lord of the Treasury and Chancellor of the Exchequer. He himself was a good friend of the Prince of Wales, who later became King George III. Lyttelton received his pension through his estranged father, and because of his parentage and ability, he also had a career in public life. He was a Whig MP for Bewdley from 1768 to 1769 and the Chief Justice of the Eyre in 1775, and became a Privy Councillor the same year.

His death was widely reported to have been foreseen by himself three days beforehand; he claimed a bird flew into his room, and told him he had only three days to live.

== Family ==
Lyttelton married Aphia Witts, but they had no children, so on his death, his barony became extinct. It was recreated in 1794, however, for his successor in the baronetcy, his father's brother Sir William Lyttelton, 7th Baronet.

== Notes ==
Parliament of Great Britain
Preceded by Sir Edward Winnington, Bt	Member of Parliament for Bewdley; 1768–1769	Succeeded by Sir Edward Winnington, Bt
Legal offices
Preceded by The Lord Pelham of Stanmer	Justice in Eyre north of the Trent; 1775–1779	Succeeded by Charles Wolfran Cornwall
Peerage of Great Britain
Preceded by George Lyttelton	Baron Lyttelton; 1773–1779	Extinct
Baronetage of England
Preceded by George Lyttelton	Baronet (of Frankley); 1773–1779	Succeeded by William Henry Lyttelton
