= Sir Thomas Lyttelton, 4th Baronet =

English landowner and Whig politician

Sir Thomas Lyttelton, 4th Baronet, of Frankley, in the County of Worcester (1686 – 14 September 1751), was an English landowner and Whig politician who sat in the House of Commons from 1721 to 1741. He held office as one of the Lords of the Admiralty from 1727 to 1741.

== Early life ==
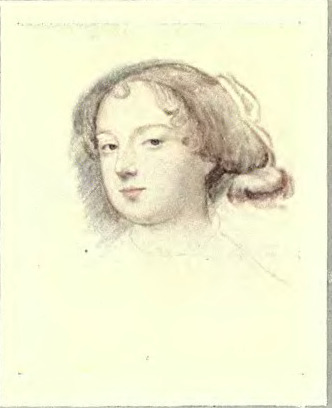
Christian Temple, portrait miniature attributed to Samuel Cooper

Lyttelton was the only surviving son of Sir Charles Lyttelton, 3rd Baronet, of Frankley, in the County of Worcester, MP, and his wife Anne Temple, daughter of Thomas Temple of Frankton, Warwickshire. He married Christian Temple, daughter of Sir Richard Temple, 3rd Baronet, of Stowe, on 8 May 1708. On the death of his father in 1716, he inherited the baronetcy and Lyttelton family estates in Frankley, Halesowen, Hagley, and Upper Arley.

== Career ==
Lyttelton was elected as one of the Members of Parliament for Worcestershire at a by-election on 6 March 1721. He was returned again at the 1727 British general election and was appointed as one of the Lords of the Admiralty in 1727, holding the post until 1741. He decided not to stand again at Worcestershire at the 1734 British general election and was brought in instead for Camelford by his son-in-law Thomas Pitt. He did not stand at the 1741 British general election.

== Legacy ==
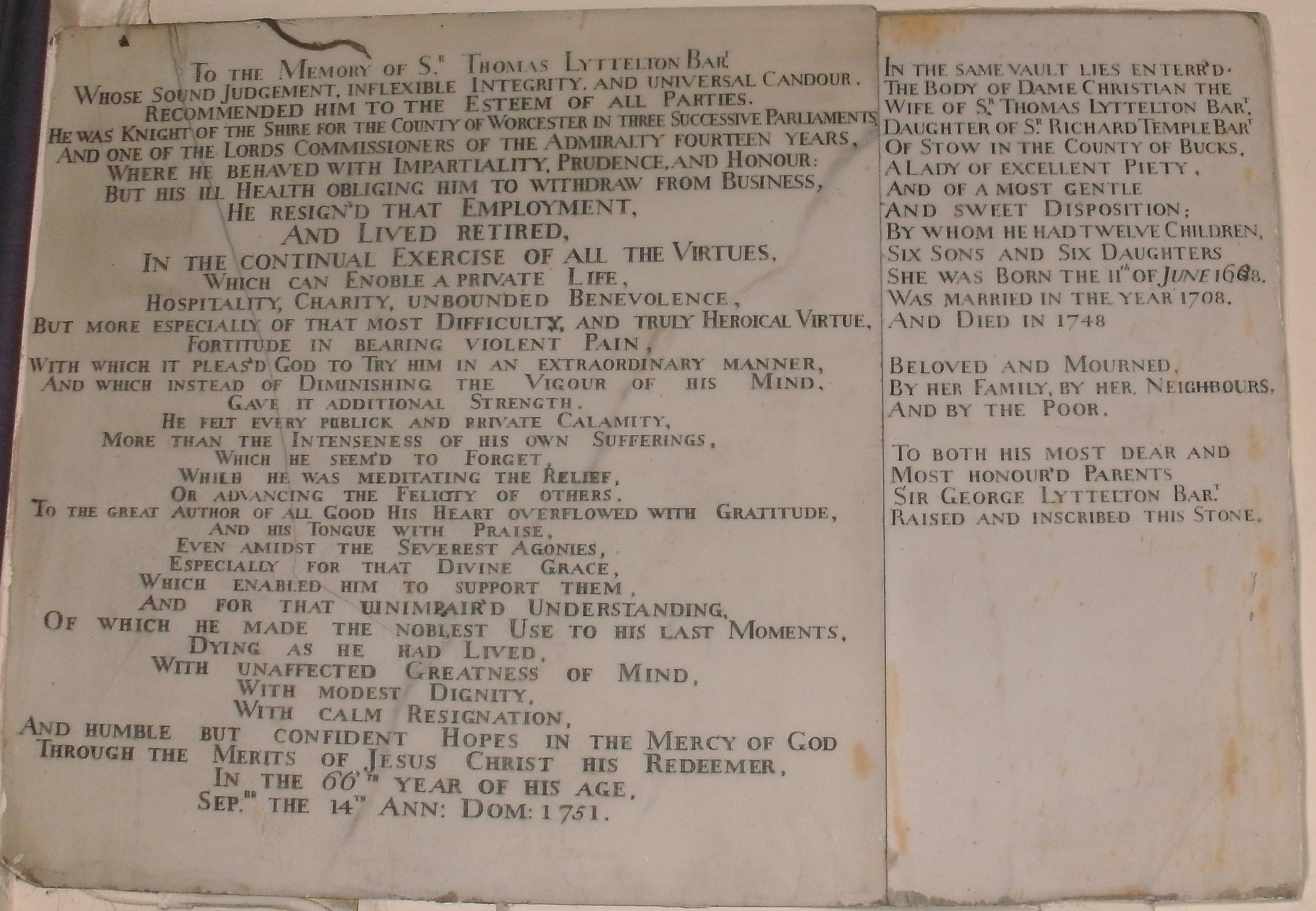
St John the Baptist Church, Hagley, memorial to Sir Thomas Lyttelton, 4th Baronet (1686–1751) and his wife Christian, née Temple

Lyttelton died on 14 September 1751, leaving six sons and six daughters. He was succeeded by his eldest son George. His second son, Charles, was Bishop of Carlisle and an antiquary. His fourth son was Lt-General Sir Richard Lyttelton, KB. His fifth son, William, succeeded as 7th baronet and was created Lord Westcote (an Irish title) in 1776 and then Baron Lyttelton in 1794. His daughter Christian married Thomas Pitt, MP.

Lyttelton's brother-in-law Sir Richard Temple, 4th Baronet was created Viscount Cobham with the special remainder (in default of his own heirs male) to his sister Christian and her heirs male and in default of them to the heirs male of Christian. This latter remainder took effect in 1889 when her descendant, Charles, Lord Lyttelton, succeeded as Viscount Cobham.

Parliament of Great Britain
Preceded by Sir John Pakington, Bt; Samuel Pytts	Member of Parliament for Worcestershire; 1721–1734; With: Sir John Pakington, Bt 1721–1727; Sir Herbert Pakington, Bt 1727–1734	Succeeded by Sir Herbert Pakington, Bt; Edmund Lechmere
Preceded by Thomas Hales; John Pitt	Member of Parliament for Camelford; 1734–1741; With: James Cholmondeley	Succeeded by The Earl of Inchiquin; Charles Montagu
Baronetage of England
Preceded by Charles Lyttelton	Baronet (of Frankley); 1716–1751	Succeeded by George Lyttelton
