= Wychbury Hill =

Archaeological site in England

Coordinates: 52.43322°N 2.11909°W

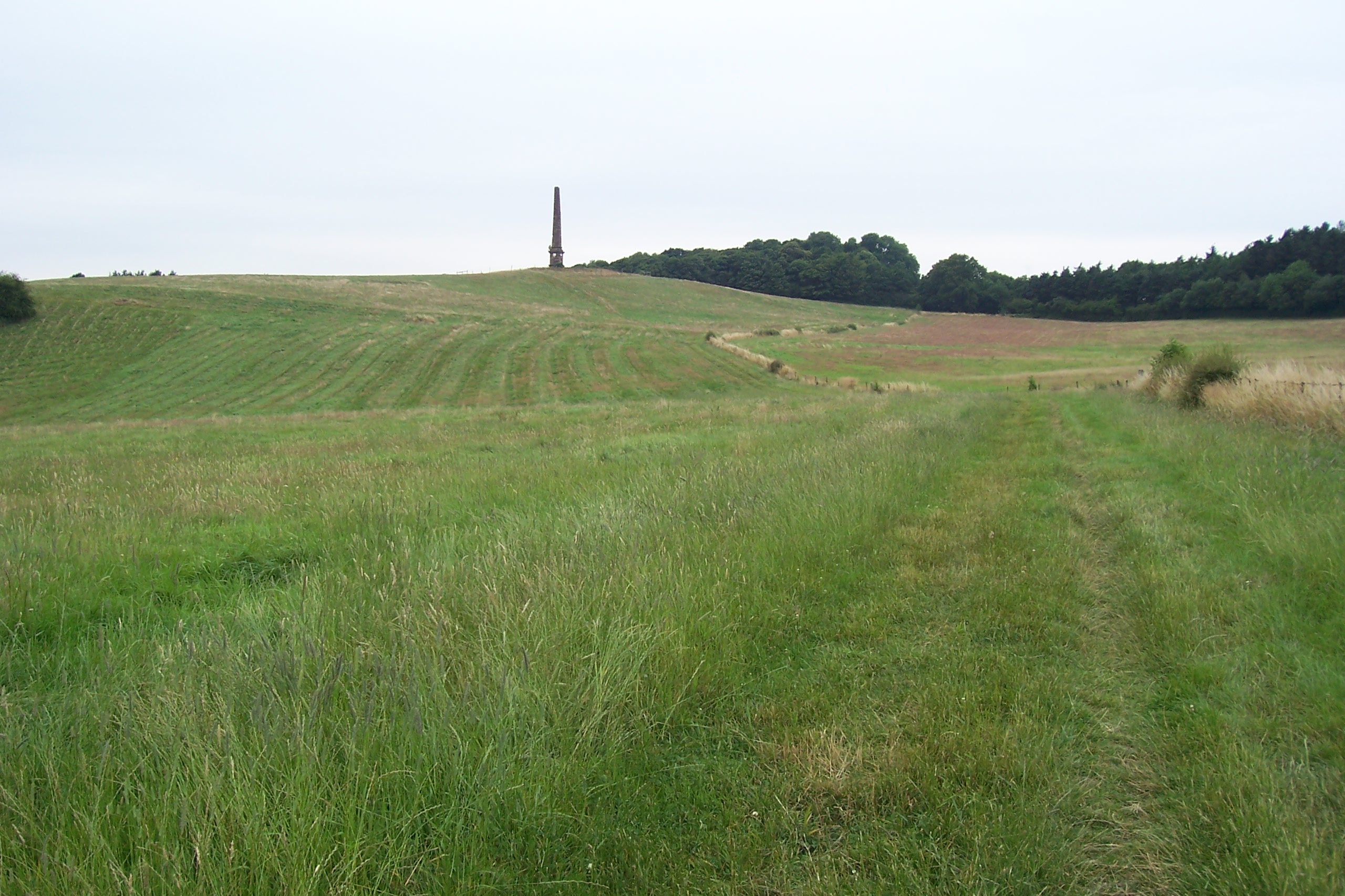
- Wychbury Hill looking towards Wychbury Obelisk

Highest point
- Elevation: 224 m (735 ft)

Geography
- Location: Stourbridge, West Midlands, England
- OS grid: SO920817
- Topo map: OS Explorer 219

Wychbury Hill is a hill situated off the A456 Birmingham Road, at Hagley, Stourbridge, on the border of West Midlands and Worcestershire.

It is divided between the parish of Hagley and former parish of Pedmore. It is one of the Clent Hills. The hill offers good views across the Severn Valley as far as the Malvern Hills and Clee Hills. It is the site of Wychbury Ring – an Iron Age hill fort – and the Wychbury Obelisk, and is much beloved of pagans, with the site containing a 28-tree ancient yew grove, and not because the name sounds like "witch". The name is actually unrelated, being derived from that of the Saxon subkingdom of the Hwicce.

On the flank of the hill is a folly in the shape of a Greek Doric temple, in fact a miniature replica of the end of the Temple of Hephaestus in Athens. Built in 1758, it was England's first example of Neoclassical architecture. The temple is currently in a seriously dilapidated and vandalised condition. It is a listed building on private land and permanently fenced off to the public.

In 1999 the obelisk was defaced with graffiti referring to the unsolved post World War II mystery: Who put Bella in the Wych Elm? when the decomposed body of a woman was found in a nearby wood. The graffiti was not removed during the restoration of the obelisk in 2010

== See also ==
- List of hill forts in England
