= Wychbury Obelisk =

Obelisk in Hagley, Worcestershire, England

Coordinates: 52°25′58″N 2°07′03″W

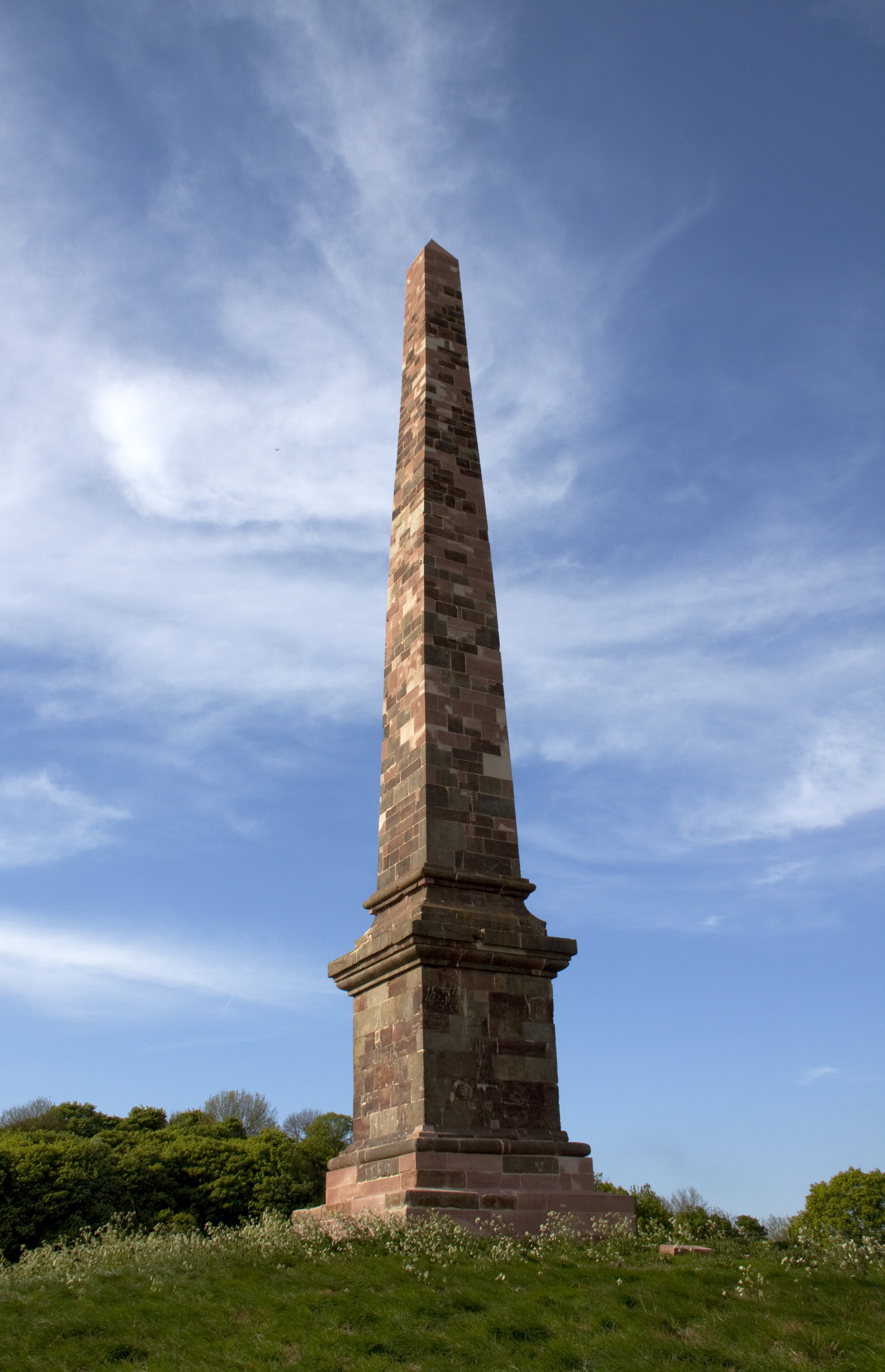
The Hagley Obelisk on Wychbury Hill

The Hagley Obelisk (also known as the Wychbury Obelisk and locally as Wychbury Monument) stands close to the summit of Wychbury Hill in Hagley, Worcestershire, approximately 150 metres (490 ft) from the border with the West Midlands. Visible for miles around, and accessible from public footpaths, it was for a while connected with a murder victim discovered on the nearby Lyttelton estate.

== History ==
The obelisk is a Grade II* listed building. It is 84 feet (26 m) high, and can be seen for many miles around, as far as away as Shropshire, and the hill if not the monument on its summit from the Malverns. In July 1764, Sir Richard Lyttelton "ordered a new Embellishment to be added to the Prospect of our Windows [Hagley Hall] by erecting an Obelisk of 70 feet high on the Summitt of the hill next to Wichbury at his expence [sic]." Construction was underway that September, and a visitor in 1765 recorded its height as 72 feet 3 inches. It is not until September 1770, however, that Lord Lyttelton writes that 'My Obelisk is finished', so possibly there were problems in its building.

There was much debate for decades over whether the eventually disintegrating structure should be demolished for safety reasons, but the consensus was that time and weather should be allowed to do the job until its restoration could be funded. It was formerly on the English Heritage list of the most endangered listed buildings until in 2010 conservation work was begun to repair it with funding aid from Natural England's Higher Level Stewardship scheme and Viscount Cobham. This involved it being largely deconstructed and rebuilt. By 2011 the obelisk had been fully restored, and included a time capsule made up of a local newsletter, a badge of the local Guild, and instructions on how to rebuild the Obelisk.

Since at least the 1970s the obelisk has been sporadically defaced with graffiti asking "Who put Bella in the Wych Elm?", a reference to an unsolved World War II-era mystery in which the decomposed body of a woman was found in a nearby wood.
