= Hagley =

Village in Worcestershire, England

Coordinates: 52.43°N 2.12°W

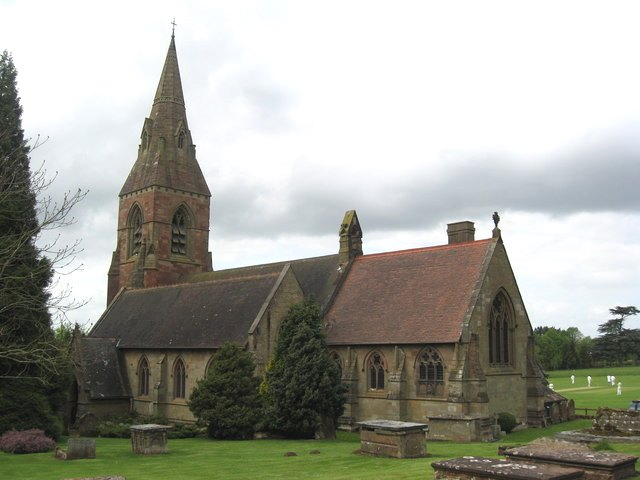
- St John the Baptist Church

- Location within Worcestershire
- Population: 7,162 (2019)
- Civil parish: Hagley
- District: Bromsgrove
- Shire county: Worcestershire
- Region: West Midlands
- Country: England
- Sovereign state: United Kingdom
- Post town: STOURBRIDGE
- Postcode district: DY8, DY9
- Dialling code: 01562
- Police: West Mercia
- Fire: Hereford and Worcester
- Ambulance: West Midlands
- UK Parliament: Bromsgrove

Hagley is a village and civil parish in Worcestershire, England. It is on the boundary of the West Midlands and Worcestershire counties between the Metropolitan Borough of Dudley and Kidderminster. Its estimated population was 7,162 in 2019.

== Development ==
From the time of the Domesday Book until the 1933 boundary changes, the parish of Hagley extended southwards from the village to include the present parish of Blakedown. The main focus of the village, on the lower slopes of the Clent Hills, was on the outskirts, where Hagley Hall and the parish church of St John the Baptist can be found. The parish register of Hagley is the oldest in England. It dates from 1 December 1538, which was the year in which registers were ordered to be kept in all parishes.

Lower Hagley lies downhill and started to expand with the arrival of the Oxford, Worcester and Wolverhampton Railway in 1852 and the eventual building of Hagley railway station. The growth of what is now known as West Hagley initiated a shift in the focus of the village. Today it includes the shopping area and the schools, although the precise dividing line between the two areas is not formally defined.

== Civil status ==
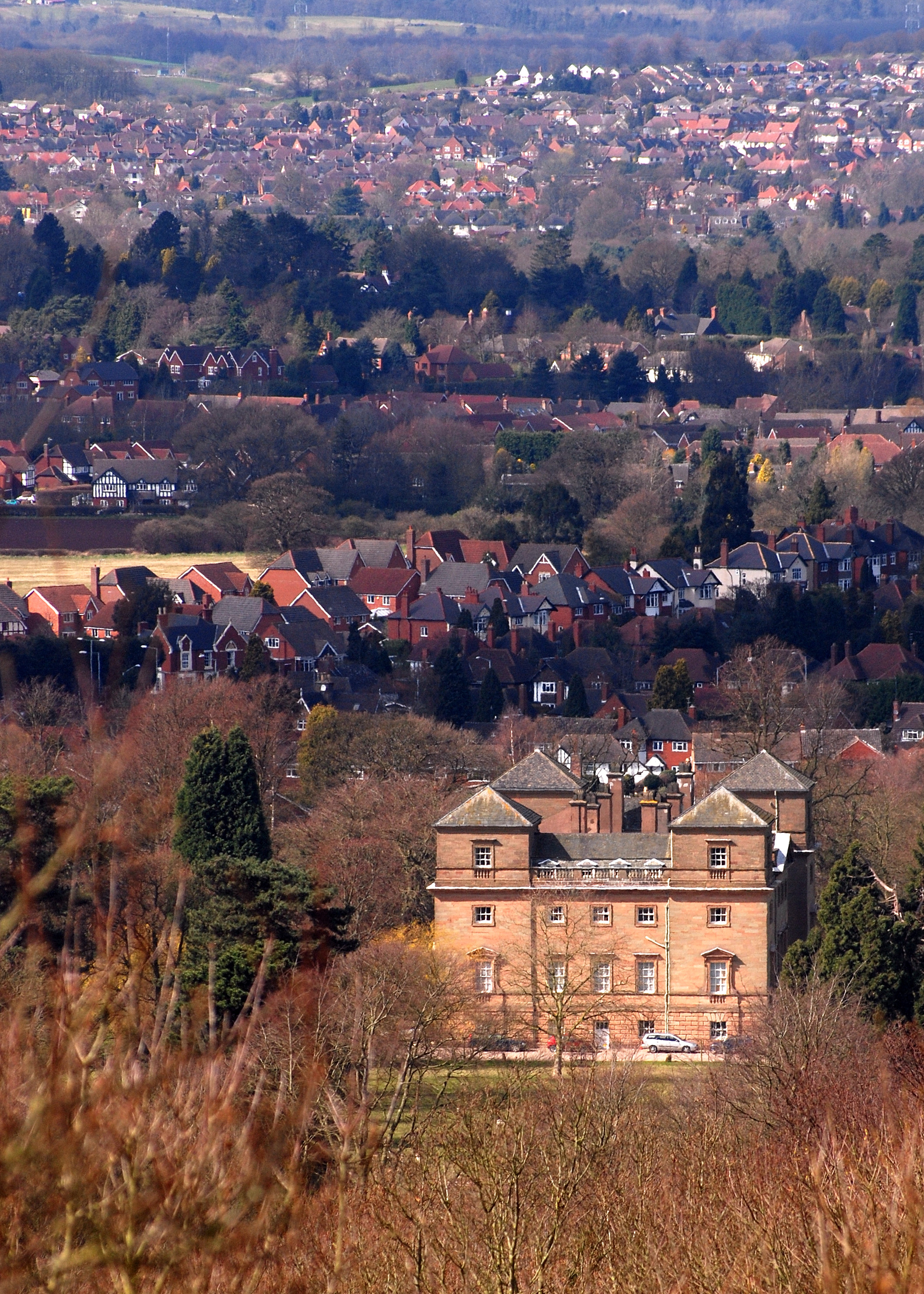
View from Hagley Hall towards West Hagley

Hagley is part of the West Midlands Urban Area as defined by the Office for National Statistics, and is joined to Stourbridge and the Black Country by the A491 and B4187 (formerly part of the A450). It is also situated on the A456 Birmingham to Kidderminster road. This is known as the Hagley Road in Birmingham, as it was once administered by a turnpike trust whose responsibilities ended at the former boundary of the parish (now in Blakedown). There is also a frequent rail service between Kidderminster and Birmingham.

Although Hagley has a population larger than some market towns (such as Tenbury Wells) and once had its own cattle market, it lacks the marks of a market town. (Note: According to the definition in West Midlands Regional Spatial Strategy, policy RR3.) While it has a shopping street and many local services, it has little local employment beyond these, although unemployment is low: 2.6 per cent of the population at the time of the 2001 census. Hagley is essentially a dormitory village for Birmingham or the adjacent Black Country.

Prior to the creation of the Parish Council by the Local Government Act 1894, village affairs were run by the ratepayers of a vestry committee based on St John the Baptist Church. Presently, Hagley falls within the boundary of Bromsgrove District Council, but it also has a Parish Council that is responsible for some local sites and services. On this sit the elected District Councillors for Hagley East and West and a number of co-opted members; it also employs a Parish Clerk and Deputy Parish Clerk.

== History ==
Evidence of previous habitation of the area is found in Bronze Age burial mounds in a field on Stakenbridge Lane which were excavated in the 18th century, and the later Iron Age hill fort on Wychbury Hill. A Roman salt road running from Droitwich crossed the Hagley parish to the west and there have been discoveries of Roman pottery and a coin hoard in the area. But the earliest written reference to the village is as Hageleia in the Domesday Book, when it formed part of the Clent Hundred, later to be amalgamated into the Halfshire Hundred. The name of the village is conjectured to derive from the Old English haggalēah meaning 'haw wood/clearing', or Haecgalēah meaning 'Haecga's wood/clearing'.

De Hagley lords of the manor first appeared in 1130, a connection lasting until 1411. Intermittent ownership followed until the 1590s, when members of the Lyttelton family took up residence, a connection that has lasted until the present day. Among these, Sir John Lyttelton was implicated in Essex's Rebellion and his brother Humphrey was hanged, drawn and quartered for sheltering men involved in the Gunpowder Plot on his Hagley estate, including his nephew Stephen. The most notable member of the family was the statesman and poet George Lyttelton, 1st Baron Lyttelton, who landscaped the grounds at Hagley and replaced the old half-timbered hall with the present Palladian mansion. His brother Charles, eventually Bishop of Carlisle, was also born at Hagley and was buried there in the family church of St John the Baptist. Another of the family, William Henry, served as rector there from 1847 to 1884.

=== Churches ===
The Domesday Book recorded that Hagley had a priest. The original wooden church dedicated to Saint John the Baptist was eventually rebuilt in stone under the De Hagley family, of which there are still traces. These include a mediaeval tomb, now incorporated into the north wall; a stone with an incised lion set into the back wall of the lady chapel; and two sandstone angels added to the 19th-century porch. From 1747 dates Louis-François Roubiliac’s memorial to Lucy Lyttelton; there is also an oval immersion font from this period, which was discarded after the virtual rebuilding of the church in Gothic style by George Edmund Street in the second half of the 19th century. It was then too that a red sandstone tower and spire were added to the building.

While the church of St John the Baptist served the old village of Hagley, the development of West Hagley after the coming of the railway initiated the building of an overspill Mission church there in 1882, after which Church Street is named. In 1906 it was replaced by St Saviour’s Church on the corner of Park Road and Worcester Road. This consists of a towerless stone-built nave and chancel in what Nikolaus Pevsner describes as "uninspired" Perpendicular style and has a series of windows by Francis Skeat. There was also a nearby Primitive Methodist chapel, which gave Chapel Street its name. Built in 1857, it was replaced in 1905 by the Free Church now on Worcester Road, whose new building continues to play a central role in the community. This union (non-denominational) church was the second such in the country.

=== Rural industry ===
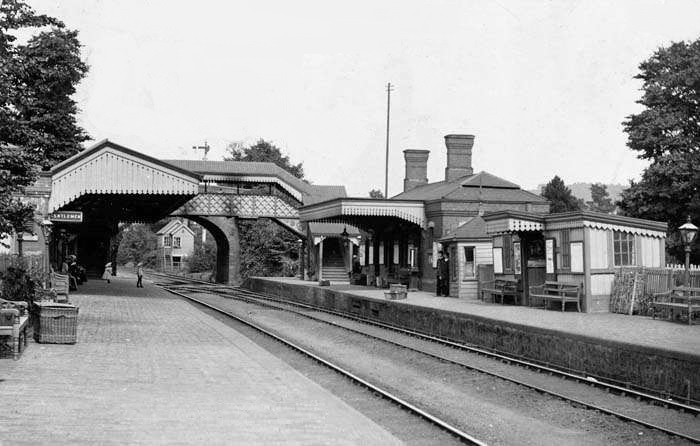
The railway station at Hagley, an Edwardian postcard

Three watercourses starting from the slopes of the Clent Hills run through the village: Hagley Brook, rising within the bounds of Hagley Park; Gallows Brook, dividing the former parish boundaries of Clent and Hagley; and Clent Brook, on which lay the former Spout Mill, near where the Worcester and Kidderminster roads diverge south of the village. The brooks combined lower down to create Sweetpool (now encroached on by the railway line and silted up); beyond that was the 18th-century Brake Mill, where the stream was dammed to create the mill pool. Before the boundary changes of 1888, a number of ironworking mills established further downstream during the Industrial Revolution gave Hagley an industrial hinterland.

Apart from the abortive Wassell Grove colliery opened during 1866–7, there was little heavy industry in the area. There is early evidence of glass-making in the village but this was probably only a cottage industry. The inhabitants were predominantly engaged in agriculture; thirteen farms are recorded in the 18th century, eighteen in the early 20th, although by the end of it only two remained. The soil is sandy and poor, so there was a greater emphasis on livestock than on arable farming. Hagley had a cattle market by 1600, located just south of the road junction between the Hagley road [to Stourbridge] (A491) and the Birmingham road (A456). This was extended in both the 18th and 19th centuries and was served by the railway until the market closed in the 1960s.

== Landmarks ==
- Hagley Hall, the home for several centuries of the Lyttelton family, whose head is Viscount Cobham
- Hagley Park, which immediately surrounds Hagley Hall, consists mainly of 350 acres (1.4 km^{2}) of landscaped deer park, although it also has a ruined Grade II* listed folly and a recently restored Palladian bridge on the grounds.
- Wychbury Hill with its "monument", an obelisk.

== Notable residents ==
- Lauren Aston, English businesswoman, lives in Hagley
- Jon Bentley of Channel Five's Fifth Gear and The Gadget Show lives in Hagley
- Jude Bellingham, English national and international footballer, lived in Hagley during his childhood
- Redditch-born John Bonham, drummer for Led Zeppelin, lived in Hagley in 1969–1972.
- William and Henry Bowles, 17th-century poets and churchmen, were both born in Hagley and eventually became rectors in Enville, Staffordshire.
- Adrian Chiles, presenter of Match of the Day 2 and formerly of The One Show, grew up in Hagley
- Andrew Downes, composer
- Clive Everton (MBE), snooker professional and commentator
- Jon Ford, professional footballer with Swansea AFC, Bradford City etc.
- Birmingham-born Doug Hele, motorcycle engineer, died in Hagley in 2001.
- Jason Koumas, professional footballer, lived in Hagley when playing for West Bromwich Albion
- The Lyttelton family, owners of Hagley Hall:
  - Meriel Lyttelton, letter writer
  - Emily Pepys, child diarist, became the first wife of the rector, Rev. William Henry Lyttelton.
  - Lucy Cavendish, née Lyttelton, advocate of women's education, was born at Hagley Hall.
- Dan O'Hagan, television football commentator and Alzheimer's disease fundraiser
- John Richards (MP), politician, sat in the House of Commons in 1832–1837 and served as High Sheriff of Worcestershire in 1844.
- Halesowen-born Lee Sharpe, professional footballer with Manchester United etc., studied at Hagley Catholic High School.

== See also ==
- Hagley Hall
- Wychbury Hill
- Hagley railway station
- Hagley Catholic High School
- Haybridge High School
