= List of museums in Gloucestershire =

This list of museums in Gloucestershire, England contains museums which are defined for this context as institutions (including nonprofit organizations, government entities, and private businesses) that collect and care for objects of cultural, artistic, scientific, or historical interest and make their collections or related exhibits available for public viewing. Also included are non-profit art galleries and university art galleries. Museums that exist only in cyberspace (i.e., virtual museums) are not included.

Name	Image	Town/City	Region	Type	Summary
Acton Court		Iron Acton	South Gloucestershire	Historic house	Conserved Tudor house built for the pleasure of Henry VIII, gardens and grounds
Berkeley Castle		Berkeley	South Gloucestershire	Historic house	Medieval castle, gardens, butterfly house
Blackfriars		Gloucester	Gloucester	Historic house	Operated by English Heritage, medieval friary later converted into a Tudor house and cloth factory
Chavenage House		Tetbury	Cotswold	Historic house	Elizabethan manor house
Chedworth Roman Villa		Chedworth	Cheltenham	Archaeology	Operated by the National Trust, artifacts and remains of a large Roman villa
Clearwell Caves		Clearwell	Forest of Dean	Mining	Former iron ore mine
Coleford Great Western Railway Museum		Coleford	Forest of Dean	Railway	Includes a former goods shed, a GWR signal box, miniature railway, locomotive
Corinium Museum		Cirencester	Cotswold	Archaeology	Artifacts found locally from Roman Britain, Neolithic and Victorian eras
Cotswold Motoring Museum		Bourton-on-the-Water	Cotswold	Transportation	Cars, motorcycles, bicycles, caravans and motoring memorabilia of the twentieth century, also toy collection
Court Barn		Chipping Campden	Cotswold	Art	craft and design, including contemporary crafts and Arts and Crafts movement pieces
Dean Forest Railway		Norchard	Forest of Dean	Railway	Heritage railway and museum at Norchard railway station
Dean Heritage Centre		Soudley	Forest of Dean	Local	Local history, trades, industry
Dr. Jenner's House		Berkeley	South Gloucestershire	Historic house	Home of Edward Jenner, the originator of vaccination
Dunkirk Mill		Nailsworth	South Gloucestershire	Industry	operated by the Stroudwater Textile Trust, former textile mill with massive working water wheel and other machinery
Dursley Heritage Centre		Dursley	Stroud	Local	local history, culture, operated by Dursley Town Trust
Dyrham Park		Dyrham	South Gloucestershire	Historic house	Operated by the National Trust, Baroque mansion with Dutch paintings, furniture and decorative arts, gardens and grounds
Frenchay Village Museum		Frenchay	South Gloucestershire	Local	history of the non-conformist Quakers and Unitarians who founded the village
Gardens Gallery		Cheltenham	Cheltenham	Art	community art gallery
Gigg Mill		Nailsworth	South Gloucestershire	Industry	operated by the Stroudwater Textile Trust, textile weaving shed demonstrating changing technologies from a simple handloom to flying shuttle to power loom
The Museum of Gloucester		Gloucester	Gloucester	Multiple	Local history, archaeology, fine and decorative arts, natural history, Roman and Mediaeval displays, dinosaurs
Gloucester Life		Gloucester	Gloucester	Multiple	Crafts, trades, industries, toys, household items, model trains, appliances, period classroom, dairy, wheelwright, carpenter and ironmonger's shops,
Gloucester Waterways Museum		Gloucester	Gloucester	Transportation	History of area canals, canal boats, equipment, natural history
Hailes Abbey		Winchcombe	Tewkesbury	Religious	Operated by English Heritage, ruins of a 13th-century Cistercian abbey, excavated artifacts
Holst Birthplace Museum		Cheltenham	Cheltenham	Historic house	birthplace of composer Gustav Holst, his life and works
Hopewell Colliery Museum		Soudley	Forest of Dean	Mining	former coal mine
Jet Age Museum		Staverton	Tewkesbury	Aviation	Restored historic aircraft, aero engines, cockpits and other related exhibits, area history in the development of jet engines
John Moore Museum		Tewkesbury	Tewkesbury	Natural history	mammals and birds of the local countryside, museum named after conservationist John Moore
Keith Harding's World of Mechanical Music		Northleach	Cheltenham	Music	, antique music boxes, automata and mechanical musical instruments in a 17th-century wool merchant's house
Kingswood Heritage Museum		Kingswood	South Gloucestershire	Local	local history, culture, industry, religion
Lydney Park		Lydney	Forest of Dean	Multiple	17th-century country estate with Roman temple complex and artifacts, gardens
Merchant's House		Tewkesbury	Tewkesbury	Historic house	15th century Tudor house by Tewkesbury Abbey
Museum in the Park		Stroud	Stroud	Local	Local history, archaeology, art exhibits, culture
Nature in Art		Gloucester	Gloucester	Art	Art inspired by nature in all forms, styles and media
Newark Park		Ozleworth	Cotswold	Historic house	Operated by the National Trust, Tudor country house reflecting over 450 years of inhabitants, gardens
Owlpen Manor		Owlpen	Stroud	Historic house	Manor house reflecting medieval, Tudor and 18th century periods, and Arts and Crafts movement restorations, gardens
Prema		Uley	Stroud	Art	arts centre
Rodmarton Manor		Cirencester	Cotswold	Historic house	Early 20th-century house with interior, decorations and furniture built house built according to Arts and Crafts movement ideals
Sezincote House		Moreton-in-Marsh	Cotswold	Historic house	19th-century reinterpretation of 16th and 17th-century Mughal architecture, gardens
Snowshill Manor		Snowshill	Cotswold	Historic house	Operated by the National Trust, features eclectic collection over 22,00 items including paintings, sculpture, toys, Japanese armor and swords, costumes, musical instruments, butter stamps, cow bell, locks, bicycles and more
Soldiers of Gloucestershire Museum		Gloucester	Gloucester	Military	History of the Gloucestershire Regiment and the Royal Gloucestershire Hussars
St. Mary's Mill		Chalford	South Gloucestershire	Industry	operated by the Stroudwater Textile Trust, c.1820 mill with a large waterwheel and a steam engine
Stanway House		Stanway	Tewkesbury	Historic house	Jacobean manor house, 18th century water garden
Sudeley Castle		Winchcombe	Tewkesbury	Historic house	Elizabethan castle, ruins, 10 gardens, exhibits of Queen Katherine Parr, textiles, Victorian memorabilia, adventure playground
Tailor of Gloucester Beatrix Potter Museum and Shop		Gloucester	Gloucester	Media	located in the original building used by author Beatrix Potter in her story The Tailor of Gloucester
Tetbury Police Museum		Tetbury	Cotswold	Law enforcement	Victorian police station and courtroom, history of the Gloucestershire Constabulary, collection of restraint equipment
Tewkesbury Borough Museum		Tewkesbury	Tewkesbury	Local	Local history, archaeology, culture, 1950s model fair
Tewkesbury Heritage Centre		Tewkesbury	Tewkesbury	Local	17th century period glovemaker's shop and period local history exhibits
Thornbury and District Museum		Thornbury	South Gloucestershire	Local	local history, culture, archaeology
Wellington Aviation Museum		Moreton-in-Marsh	Cotswold	Military	history and artifacts from RAF Moreton-in-Marsh
The Wilson		Cheltenham	Cheltenham	Multiple	Art, decorative arts, local history, archaeology, ethnographic artefacts from Africa and Asia
Winchcombe Folk and Police Museum		Winchcombe	Tewkesbury	Multiple	local history, culture, police uniforms, equipment and artifacts
Woodchester Mansion		Woodchester	Stroud	Historic house	Unfinished 19th-century Gothic revival mansion house
Wotton-under-Edge Heritage Centre		Wotton-under-Edge	Stroud	Local	local history, industries and crafts, culture
Yate Heritage Centre		Yate	South Gloucestershire	Local	local history, culture

== Defunct museums ==
- Bristol Aero Collection, now Aerospace Bristol, at Filton, Bristol.
- Cinderbury Iron Age Experience, Clearwell
- Park House Toy Collectors Museum, Stow-on-the-Wold, closed in 2011
- Shambles Victorian Village, Newent

== See also ==
- Category:Tourist attractions in Gloucestershire
