= 5 North St =

Coordinates: 51.9537°N 1.9641°W

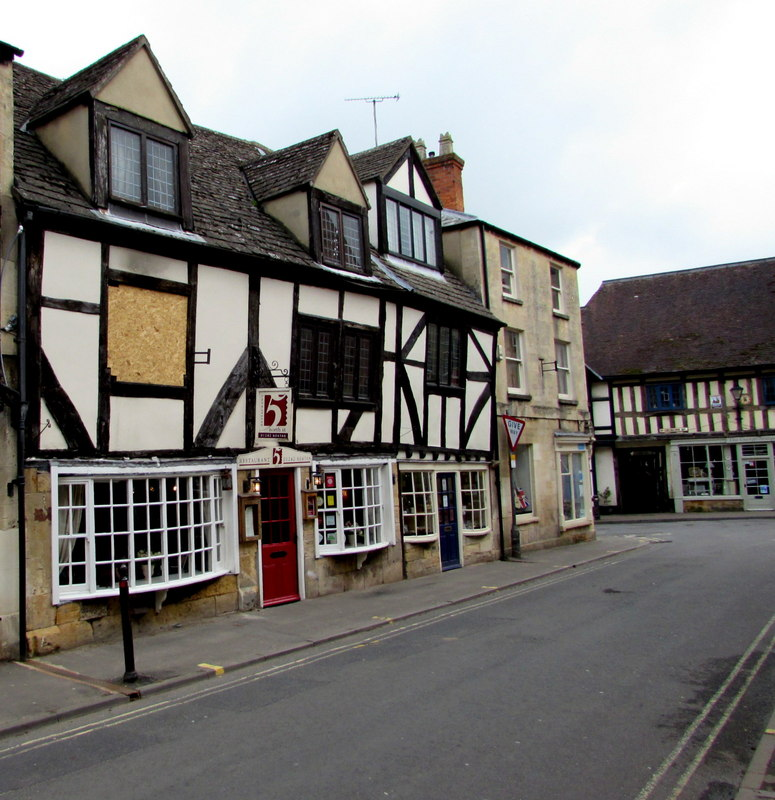
- 5 North Street, Winchcombe

Restaurant information
- Established: 24 January 2003
- Chef: Marcus Ashenford
- Rating: (Michelin Guide 2004–15)
- Location: 5 North Street, Winchcombe, Gloucestershire, England
- Website: www.5northstreetrestaurant.co.uk

5 North St, also known as 5 North Street, is a restaurant located in Winchcombe, Gloucestershire, England, which is owned and run by chef Marcus Ashenford. It has held a Michelin star for over a decade.

== History ==
Chef Marcus Ashenford had previously held a Michelin star at the Chavignol restaurant, purchased 5 North St for £56,000 in 2002 and moved in on 15 January 2003. It had previously operated as Poacher's under former owners Claire and Frank Eckermann. Under Ashenford, the restaurant reopened on 24 January 2003 and described the food to be served on the new menu, saying "I'll be cooking the same sort of food as at Chavignol but we want an affordable family-run restaurant where all the locals can come as well as people that are into food".

He also announced his intention to aim to repeat his success with Michelin stars, but said that he didn't want to "become obsessed by it". At opening, his wife Kate was running the front of house and he was joined by Marcus McGuinness as pastry chef, who had previously worked with Ashenford at Chavignol. Despite the intention for Ashenford's wife to only work until she gave birth until their first child as she was seven months pregnant when they opened, she was still working there nearly two years later. After three years, McGuinness departed to join the team at nearby Le Champignon Sauvage and went on to join Claude Bosi at his restaurant Hibiscus.

In 2014, Ashenford published a cook book based on recipes from 5 North Street, entitled Flavour. The book was edited by Andy Richardson.

== Description ==
The timbers on the exterior of the building are more than 400 years old. The restaurant can seat 28 diners at a time, and because of the age of the building it has some quirks of layout – such as the wine cellar access being through a trapdoor in the women's bathroom.

== Reception ==
Food critic Matthew Fort described the dishes as simple when he wrote a review for The Guardian in 2003. But he clarified by saying that "simplicity did not lead to a diminution in effectiveness, excellence and all-round edibility". He praised several dishes, including a pigeon dish with bubble and squeak and sweet onion confit, and said that the pork belly and mushy peas was "little short of paradisiacal for those who love comfort in the tum". Fort was pleased with the value of the meal, and gave the restaurant a rating of seventeen out of twenty. Fort's review was later framed and hung inside the restaurant.

In 2004, Jay Rayner described Ashenford's food as "evolved and refined, in the way of small restaurants which have sought and gained a Michelin star" while writing for The Observer. He tried the tasting menu, and found that the courses were consistent but not similar to each other. His only complaints were towards the pasta in a duck ravioli, an overchilled parfait and that he "really could have done without Dido on the sound system". Visiting in 2013, Matthew Norman wrote for The Daily Telegraph, describing the restaurant itself as "determinedly unfussy" but added that the food "tries that shade too hard to impress". He felt that a dish of Cornish brill had too many competing flavours on the plate, but praised a "majestic lemon verbena brûlée". He summed up by saying that "This is a good restaurant which strives mightily to please with cute flourishes such as the rarebit and the excellent coffee and rum truffles served with coffee. But somewhere in the chasm between the understated homeliness of the room and the over-elaboration in the kitchen, the chance of greatness is lost."

As of 2014, the restaurant holds one Michelin star. It has held this award since 2004.
