= Walton Hill =

Hill in Worcestershire, England

Coordinates: 52.41527°N 2.08670°W

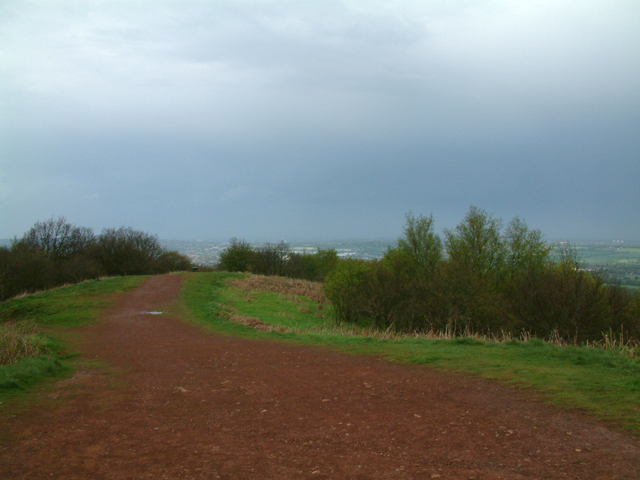
- The path along the summit ridge of Walton Hill

Highest point
- Elevation: 316 metres (1,037 ft)
- Prominence: 207 metres (679 ft)
- Parent peak: The Wrekin
- Listing: Marilyn

Geography
- Location: Worcestershire, England
- OS grid: SO942797
- Topo map: OS Landranger 139

At 316 metres (1,037 ft) above sea level, Walton Hill is the highest point in the range of hills in northern Worcestershire known as the Clent Hills. It is the highest point for 21 miles (34 km) in all directions, and as such commands an excellent panorama. Its neighbours include Clent Hill, Wychbury Hill (which is hidden from view by Clent Hill), Calcot Hill, and Romsley Hill.

The summit of the hill is open grassland and heath, which was commonland of the manor of Clent. This became a regulated common in 1935, as a result of action by Bromsgrove Rural District Council, and was given to the National Trust in 1959. Woodlands on the side of the hill in the Clatterbach valley were bought by Worcestershire County Council in 1957 and given by it to the National Trust in 1959.

== Views ==
From the summit looking south west down the main spine of the hill the closer peaks of the Clee Hills, The Wrekin, Malvern and Abberley hills are usually visible. On a clear day, one can see 30 miles (48 km) south to the Cotswolds, 25 miles (40 km) south west to the Malvern Hills, 35 miles (56 km) north east to Charnwood Forest, 40 miles (64 km) north to the Peak District, 20 miles (32 km) west to the Shropshire Hills, the Bromyard Downs in Herefordshire, and 55 miles (89 km) south west to the Black Mountains. This comes from its situation in the middle of England, distant from all other hills but not too distant.

== Ascents ==
The hill can be walked up on foot from most directions. The most common ascent is from a car park north east of the summit. The car park is most easily accessed from A456 road via Hagley Wood Lane (leaving it between Hagley and Hayley Green) or Uffmoor Lane (leaving it just east of Hayley Green). Both lead to a tee-junction at the top of St. Kenelm's Pass next to High Harcourt Farm. The lane from High Harcourt Farm skirts Walton Hill finishing at another tee-junction with the A491 road at the Hollybush (public house). For access routes please refer to the relevant Ordnance Survey map (Explorer 1:25,000 series – Wolverhampton & Dudley).

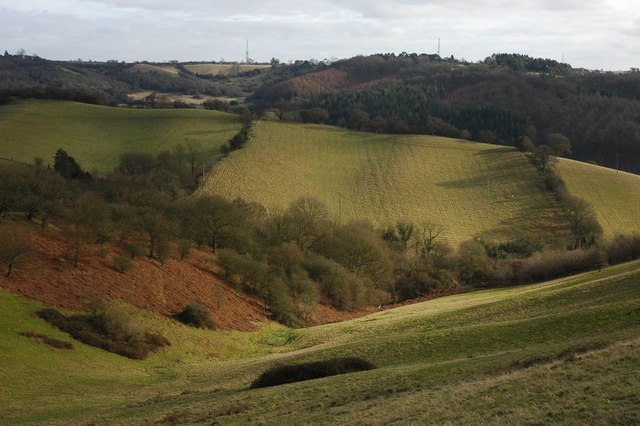
View from the path to Calcot Hill over the valley that contains Shut Mill Lane towards Great Farley Wood and Romsley Hill.

Further along the lane the hill can be accessed on foot via the long bricked paved driveway to Walton Hill Farm. From the same lane, about halfway to the Hollybush, is Sling Common near the entrance to Calcot Hill Farm on Calcot Hill, which gives access to the summit of Walton Hill along a footpath which follows a ridge through private farm land, leading to Walton Hill Farm, where the path enters the National Trust land on the summit of Walton Hill.

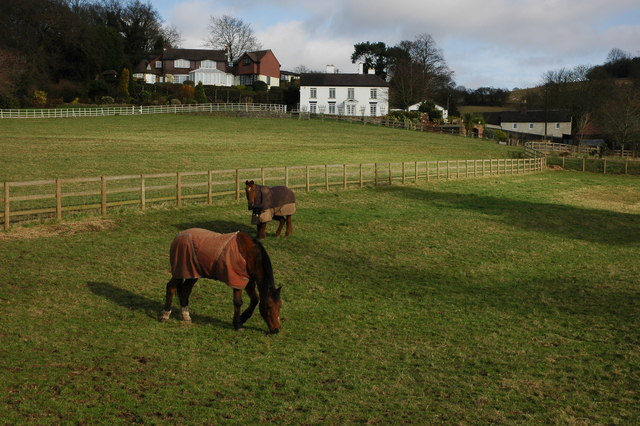
Walton Pool, a hamlet on Walton Hill

A bridle path runs from Calcot Hill Farm, along the southern face of the Walton Hill to the hamlet of Walton Pool. This crosses a footpath from Belbroughton and the A491 across farmland on its way towards the summit. From Walton Pool, a hamlet in the parish of Clent, two bridle paths follow the lines of two ridges, and meet to form the main south western spine of Walton hill. To the north west of Walton Pool there is a footpath which starts at St. Leonards church, the Parish church in Clent, and joins one of the two bridleways emanating from Walton Pool. Another path starts in the hamlet of Clatterbach, near the Vine Inn in Clent village and this allows direct access to the north western flank of Walton Hill.

The northern car park is at 260 metres (850 ft) above sea level. The other access points onto the hill start from slightly lower down the slope at 250 metres (820 ft) The access from the northern car park has the steepest and shortest route to the summit, but there is also an easy access trail which winds around the end of the hill. The Calcot Hill route is just over a mile long (about two kilometres). The other routes are all about a mile (about a kilometre and a half) to the summit.

== SOTA ==
Walton Hill has a Summits On The Air (SOTA) reference of G/CE-002
