= Richard Fowler =

Richard Fowler may refer to:

- Richard A. Fowler (born 1987), radio show host, media personality, and political activist
- Richard Fowler (cricketer) (1887–1970), English cricketer
- Sir Richard Fowler (chancellor) (died 1477), English administrator, Chancellor of the Exchequer
- Sir Richard Fowler, 2nd Baronet (1681–1731), English politician
- Richard Fowler (physician) (1765–1863), English physician
- Rick Fowler, musician
- Richard Fowler (naturalist) (1948–2016), American veteran, naturalist, and jungle expedition guide
- Richard Gildart Fowler (1916-1992), American physicist

== See also ==
- Dick Fowler (disambiguation)
- Rickie Fowler (born 1988), professional golfer
