= Dick Fowler =

Dick Fowler may refer to:

- Dick Fowler (baseball) (1921–1972), baseball pitcher
- Dick Fowler (footballer) (born 1890), Australian footballer
- Dick Fowler (politician) (1932–2012), former member of the Legislative Assembly of Alberta
- John Richard Fowler (1927–2007), known as Dick, local politician in Memphis, Texas

== See also ==
- Richard Fowler (disambiguation)
