= Winchcombe School =

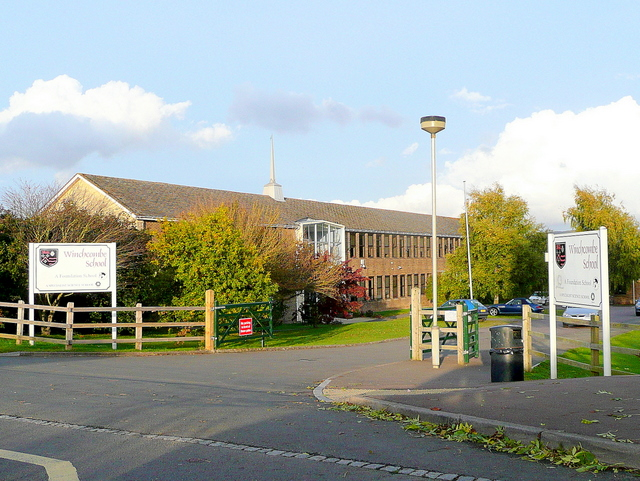

Location
- Greet Road; Winchcombe, Gloucestershire, GL54 5LB; England
- Coordinates: 51.9637°N 1.9641°W

Information
- Type: Academy
- Established: 1952 (2011 as academy)
- Department for Education URN: 136764 Tables
- Ofsted: Reports
- Headteacher: Jonathan Templeton
- Gender: Mixed
- Age: 11 to 16
- Enrolment: 476 as of June 2024
- Houses: Langley, Cleeve, Sudeley, Prescott
- Colours: Purple, yellow, blue, green
- Website: https://www.winchcombeschool.co.uk/

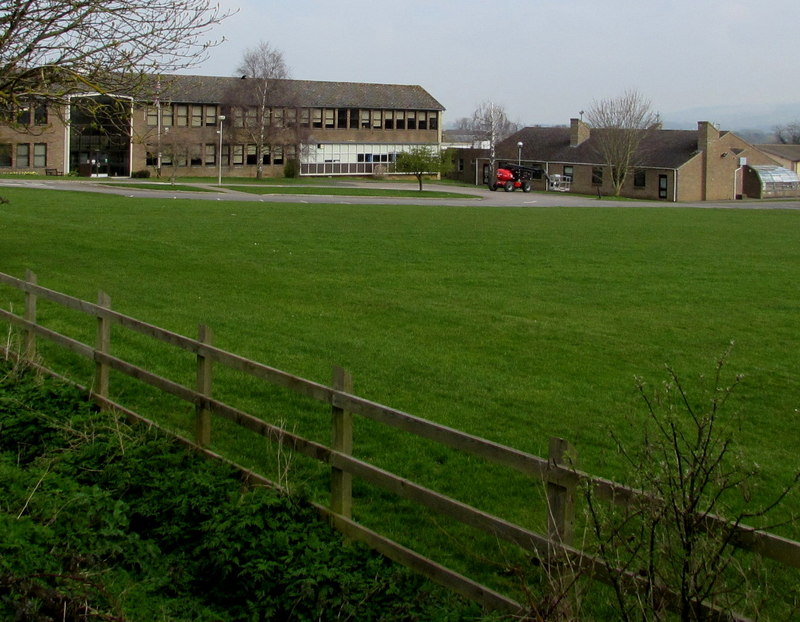
View of the south side of the school, looking over the playing field

Winchcombe School is a mixed secondary school located in Winchcombe in the English county of Gloucestershire. The school opened in 1952.

Previously a foundation school administered by Gloucestershire County Council, Winchcombe School was converted to academy status on 1 June 2011. The school later join the Balcarras Trust in November 2023.
