= Clent Hills =

Hill range in Worcestershire, England

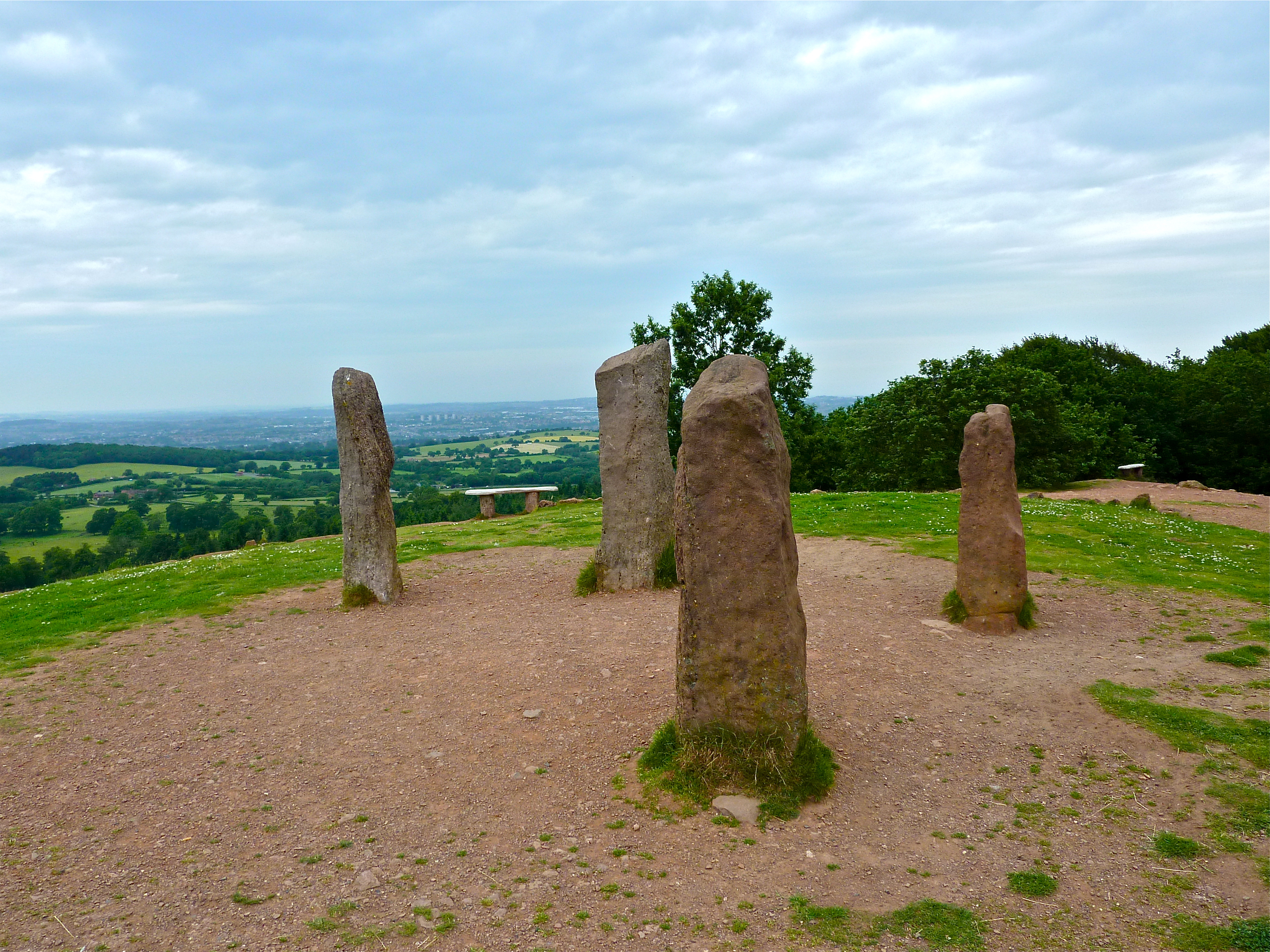
- The four stones at the top of Clent Hill at 52° 25′ 15.29″ N, 2° 5′ 56.12″ W

Highest point
- Elevation: 316 m (1,037 ft)
- Prominence: 45 m (148 ft)

Geography
- Location: Worcestershire, England
- OS grid: SO942797

The Clent Hills are a hill range in Clent, Worcestershire, England. The hill range consists of, in order from north-west to south-east, Wychbury Hill, Clent Hill (and Adams Hill), and Walton Hill (and Calcot Hill). The north Worcestershire range of hills continues eastwards to include Romsley Hill, Waseley Hills and the Lickey Hills. The closest towns to the hills are Stourbridge and Halesowen, while Birmingham lies 10 miles (16 km) to the northeast.

Clent Hill is the most popular hillwalking hill in the range, although it is not often mentioned because the whole area is referred to as Clent Hills. Just under a million visitors a year are estimated to come to the hills, making them Worcestershire's most popular non-paying attraction.

== Geology ==
The Clent Hills are a major outcrop of the Clent Formation consisting of Clent Breccia (predominantly a red-brown mudstone matrix) dating from the early part of the Permian period. The formation unconformably overlies the mudstones and sandstones of the Salop Formation which forms the lower ground to the north and east; both are assigned to the Warwickshire Group. The bedrock is cut by numerous faults, most of which are aligned NE-SW.

== Geography ==
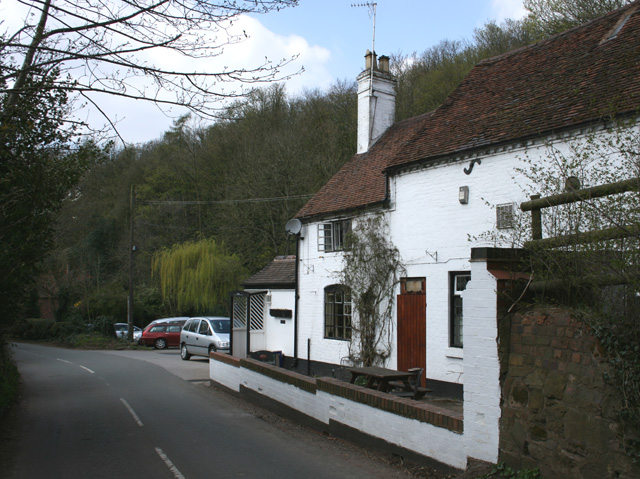
The Vine Inn, originally a water mill

The hills along with the Lickey Hills form a range of hills in north Worcestershire known as the Clent-Lickey range (or the Clent-Lickey ridge). The largest of the Clent Hills is Walton Hill which is 1,037 feet (316 m) high followed by Clent Hill at 1,014 feet (309 m). They are separated by a valley known as St. Kenelm's Pass, which starts as an escarpment one side of which along with the sides of the two hills falls away towards Uffmoor Wood; water flowing down this slope enters streams which become the River Stour. Close to the top of the escarpment, but just on the other side, stands High Harcourt Farm (which belongs to the National Trust, but its farm land is not open to the public). Below the farm the escarpment falls away and becomes a sharp V valley in which a stream flows down into Clent village. Where the valley sides are at their steepest the Walton Hill side of the valley is known as Clatterbach. In the past, before steam power replaced water power, the stream in the valley was dammed at regular intervals to provide power for watermills. The remains of one such dam can be seen behind the Vine Inn in Clent which was once a mill.

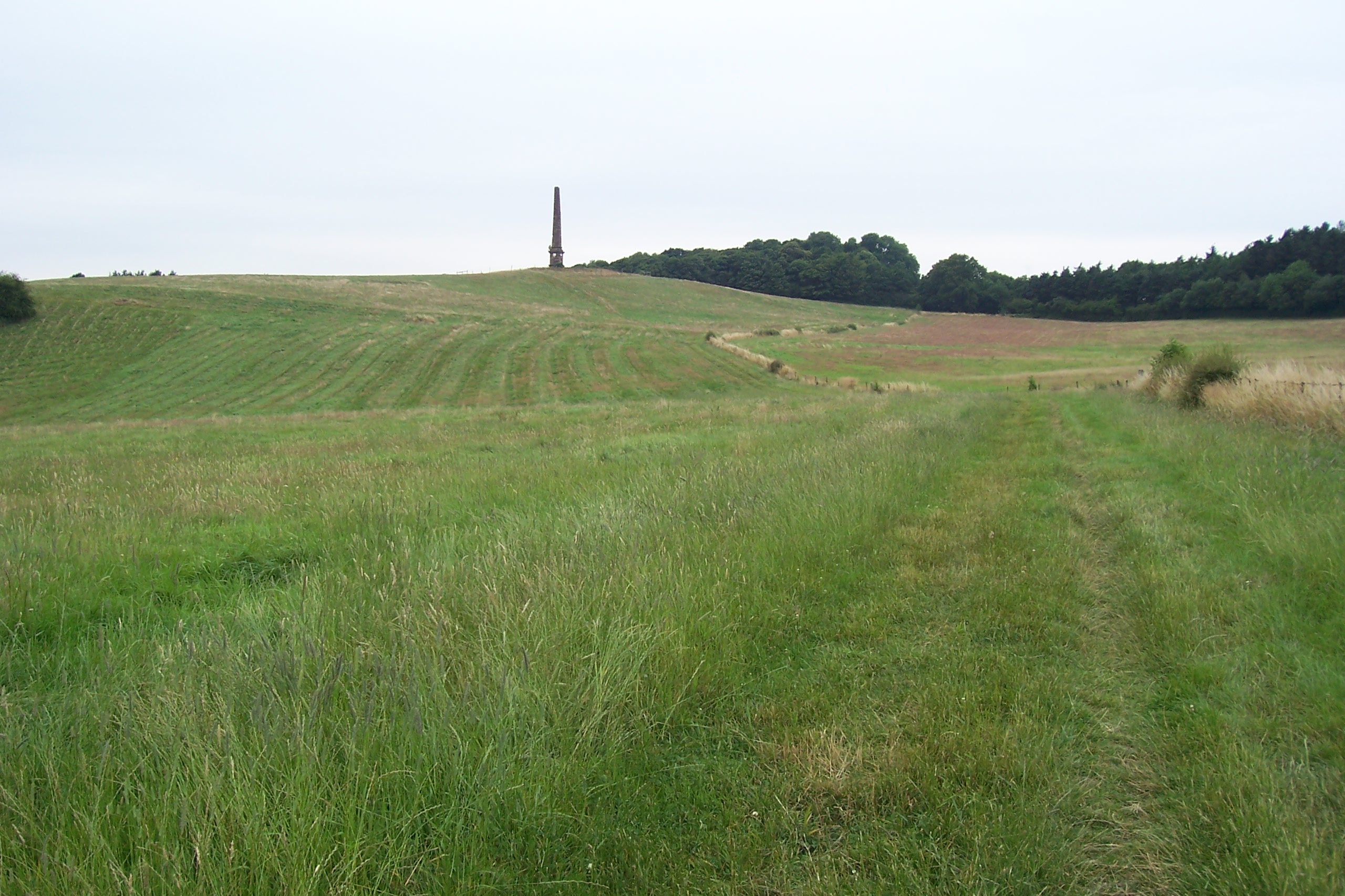
Wychbury Hill

Either side of the two largest hills are two more hills. Beside Clent Hill is Wychbury Hill and beside Walton Hill is Calcot Hill. Calcot Hill is not really a separate hill but at the end of a long spur which runs from the summit of Walton Hill for about a mile. There is a public footpath along the spur joining the two hills. Alongside the spur is another deep V-shaped valley which was also dammed at frequent intervals to provide power to its mills. This stream flows on to the village of Belbroughton in which the Nash Crown Scythe Works used the water to power its machinery. On the other side of the valley is Romsley Hill, the valley banks of which are covered by Great Farley Wood beyond Romsley Hill are a number of lower hills (Windmill, Chapman's and Waseley) which join the Clent Hills to the Lickey Hills in one continuous chain.

The National Trust land on the hills encompass 440 acres (180 ha) of woodland (both natural deciduous and coniferous forest plantations) and heathland, important for wildlife including fallow deer and common buzzard, plus visiting ring ouzel and common crossbill.

== History ==
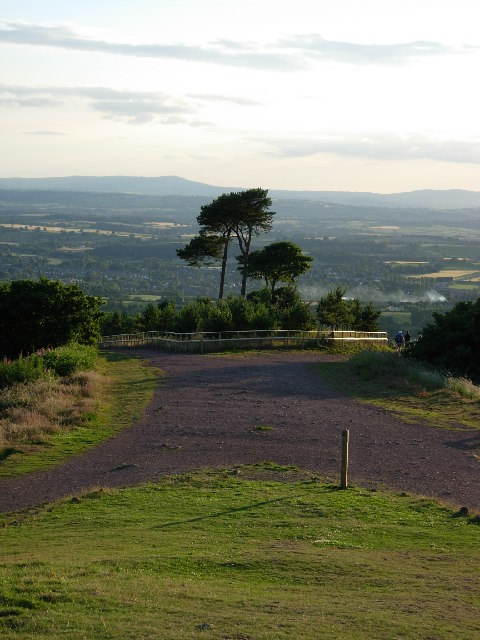
View from Clent Hill towards the Clee Hills of Shropshire

Clent appears in the Domesday Book as "Klinter", and may be derived from the old Scandinavian word klint for a cliff. Once part of a Mercian forest, the hills contain the remains of a multi-vallate, Iron Age hillfort on Wychbury Hill. According to local historian John Amphlett, a battle between ancient Britons and Romans was fought on Clent Heath.

The Clent Hills are graced with several classically inspired architectural works from about the 1750s. Most of them are in the private grounds of Hagley Hall but most of them are visible from public areas. Lord Lyttelton of Hagley Hall constructed the Wychbury Obelisk on Wychbury Hill in 1758, which is visible for many miles, even from the Clee Hills. Lord Lyttelton also had constructed many other follies including a Temple of Theseus, other small Greek and Roman temples, a full sized ruined mock castle (his lands did not contain a real one) and The Four Stones on top of Clent Hill.

The Clent Hills are also well known for their role in the legend of St. Kenelm, who was murdered on a hunting trip at the north eastern slopes of Clent Hill in 821 AD. The church of St. Kenelm in the parish of Romsley marks the site of his murder. The church is the starting point of the 60-mile (97 km) walk St Kenelm's Trail. One source of the River Stour is within the grounds of St. Kenelm's church.

The summits of the two largest hills, Clent Hill and Walton Hill are now the property of the National Trust. Clent Hill Common was managed by a Board of Conservators from 1881 to 1959. Walton Hill Common became regulated common land (under Commons Act 1899) in 1935. Both commons and the woodlands between them were given by Worcestershire County Council and Bromsgrove Rural District Council to the National Trust in 1959. Both hills were then managed by a Management Committee of the National Trust until 1974, when the committee became advisory only. Both the Conservators and Management Committee were largely funded by contributions from neighbouring local authorities, particularly in the Black Country. In 1974, the hills became a country park, managed by Hereford & Worcester County Council under the Countryside Act 1968. In 1995, management reverted to the National Trust, which set up a new advisory committee in 2000.

=== Beacons ===
In 1588 a beacon was placed on the Bicknall as part of the chain set up to warn of the approach of the Spanish Armada.

For Queen Victoria's Diamond Jubilee, A. E. Housman watched the beacons from summit of Walton Hill. He wrote in a letter to his mother that at 10 o'clock on the night of 22 June 1897 (the hour designated for the event) he could see 52 just to the south and west. He did not try to count those northwards because "it was hard to tell the beacons from the ordinary illuminations of the Black Country". The one on the Malvern Hills was so large that during the day it had been visible from Walton Hill, and as it was saturated with paraffin it burned very brightly but only for an hour. By 2 o'clock, Housman wrote that in the distance two could still be seen still burning somewhere near the Brown Clee, and three nearer, one towards Droitwich, one on Kinver Edge (it continued to burnt brightly until dawn), and the Clent Hill beacon which was not near the summit but on the south west face.

In 1977 a bonfire beacon was built close to the summit of Walton Hill and lit on 6 June as one of a national chain that started with one lit by the Queen at Windsor Castle to mark the Silver Jubilee of Elizabeth II. Another was lit on 4 June 2012 for the Golden Jubilee of Elizabeth II. It was 12 feet (3.7 m) high and 8 feet (2.4 m) wide, and situated on Clent Hill close to the Four Stones.

== View ==
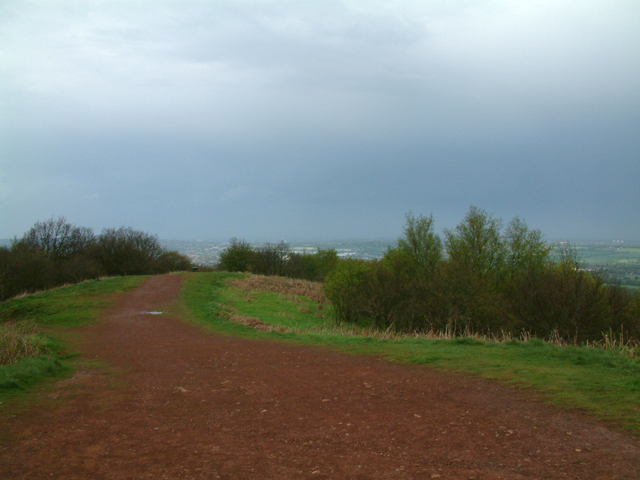
A view from the summit of Walton Hill looking north-east towards Birmingham.

The hills rise to a height of 1,037 feet (316 m) on Walton Hill, with views over the Malvern Hills, Kinver Edge, The Wrekin, Wenlock Edge, Shatterford Hill, Clee Hills and back round to Kidderminster, Stourbridge, Dudley, Halesowen and Turners Hill. On a clear day observers can see as far as the Black Mountains of Wales, the northern Cotswolds, the southern Peak District and Charnwood Forest. A toposcope indicates the mountains visible. Landmarks visible from the hills include Dudley Castle, the large Droitwich AM transmitters near Bromsgrove, the large silos (now demolished for housing) on the Ex British Sugar Corporation land in Kidderminster, Ironbridge Power Station (now decommissioned and demolished), near Telford and the nearby Wychbury Obelisk. It is because of this that the hills are very popular with hillwalking visitors and local ramblers groups. The hills are criss-crossed with many public footpaths. A popular means of access to Clent Hill is from Nimmings car park, off Hagley Wood Lane. From this an easy access walk route leads to the ridge. Another popular access is from the public car park on Adams Hill. Adams Hill is not a separate hill, but the name for the hamlet (part of the parish of Clent) and the slope that form the south west flank of Clent Hill.

In 2009 Cooper Partnership (a firm of Chartered Landscape Architects) were commissioned to "identify and assess a selection of key views to and from the Malvern Hills" by the Malvern Hills Area of Outstanding Natural Beauty Partnership. Coopers identified 50 key views from vantage points some on the Malvern Hills and others from other vantage points looking at the Malverns. At 22 miles (35 km) the view from the Clent Hills was the most distant. They rated importance of the view as special and the sensitivity as high and wrote that the Clent Hills had "many pedestrian and equestrian users" and in "[a] lovely environment of countryside pursuits" the vista contained a:

180-degree panoramic view towards the south-west from elevated viewpoint on SW facing slope of Clent Hills, affording long distance views. Malvern Hills seen to the left of view in the context of other hill ranges seen to the centre and right of view. Generally hilly foreground with scattered settlements on lower lying land. Urban areas of Kidderminster and Stourbridge seen in centre mid-ground. [At] night-time: scattered light sources. The distinctive outline of the Malvern Hill peaks is seen on the distant skyline as a back-drop to the view in the left of view, and appears further in distance to the other hill ranges seen to the centre/right distance. Far-fetching views of hill ranges, including that of Malvern Hills is impressive, across a generally rural setting. … The view of wide range of hills is impressive.

— Cooper Partnership.

== Cultural influence ==
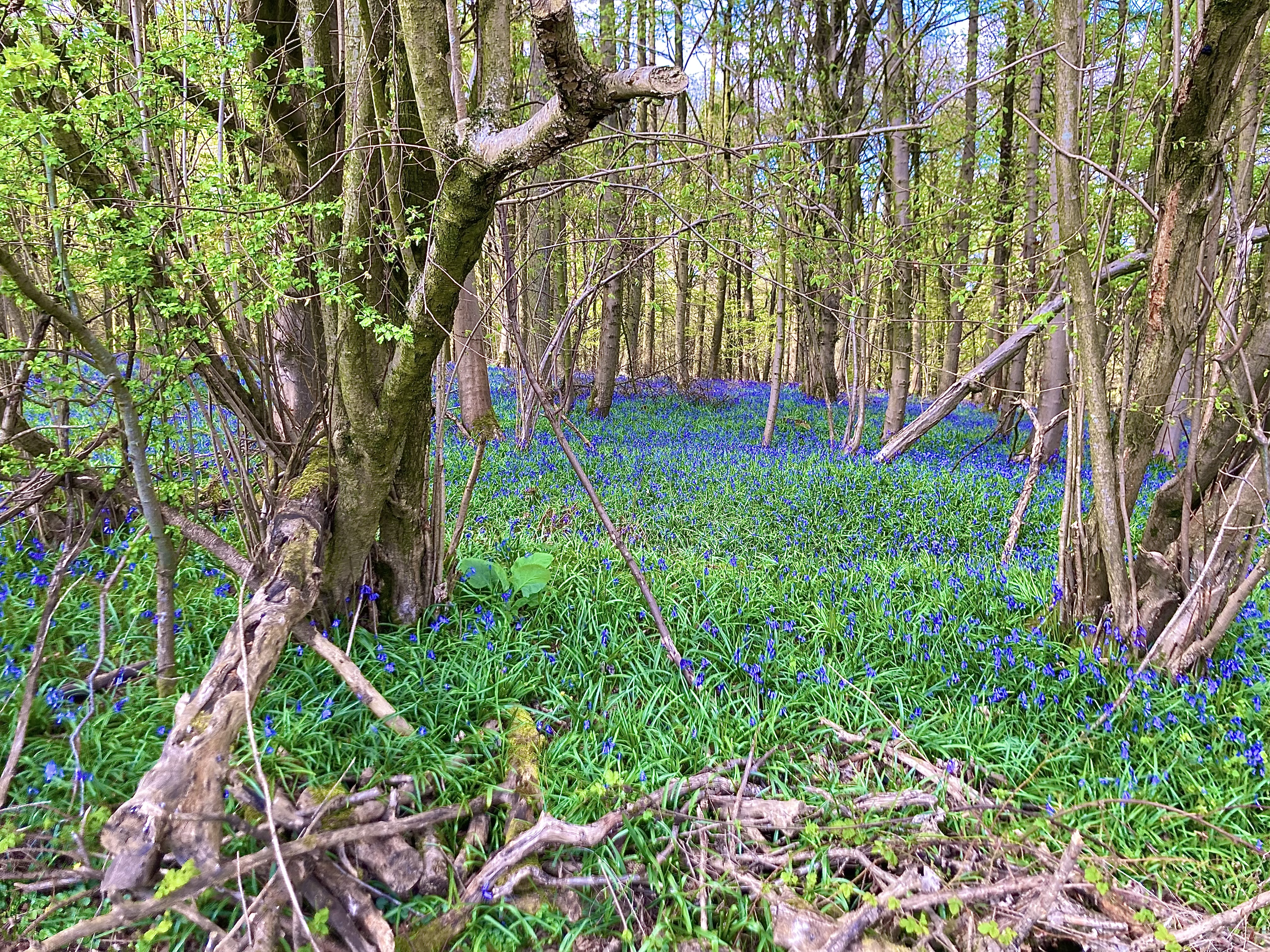
A bluebell wood in the Clent Hills.

The poet William Shenstone lived at The Leasowes and was a near neighbour of the Lyttelton family at Hagley Hall. Shenstone garden at The Leasowes was one of the most notable gardens in England in the mid-1700s and his Unconnected Thoughts on Gardening one of the more influential of the age.

On 30 August 1746 William Lyttelton called at The Leasowes with his friend the poet James Thomson. Shenstone later wrote a letter about the encounter which was published in 1800.

After introductions and a conversation inside the house about a valley and the brook that Lyttelton and Thomson passed on their way to The Leasowes and which had much impressed Thomson for its beauty, Shenstone invited the pair to view the vista from the green behind his house. They conversed about a small nearby feature called Farmers Hill and Thomson suggested that Shenstone should extend his garden, but Shenstone explained to him that he would rather take which was already there and augment it "The French, it appears, have their [P]arque ornèe; and why is not Ferme ornèe as good an expression?". As his guests could not stay long owing to a dinner engagement they were unable to visit Shenstone's upper wood, but warming to Thomson's suggestion on how to improve the landscape, Shenstone wrote that the conversation continued thus:

"You have nothing to do (says [Thomson]) but to dress Nature. Her robe is ready made; you have only to caress her; love her; kiss her; and then --- descend into the valley." Coming out into the court before the house, he mentioned Clent and Waw-ton Hill as the two bubbies of Nature: then Mr L. observed the nipple, and then Thomson the fringe of Uphmore wood; till the double entendre was work'd up to a point, and produced a laugh.

In June 2012 poet and writer Helen Calcutt was appointed the first writer-in-residence of the Clent Hills, in association with The National Trust volunteer team. The poet spent three months interviewing visitors to the hills, transcribing their reflections into verse. The result of the project was the poem 'Poem to Clent', lines from which can be found en route to the Four Stones, on the Clent Hills archway, launched in December 2012.

== Principal summits ==
There is no hard-and-fast boundary to the Clent Hills because the area is not a National Landscape or similar. The following summits within the rough area have more than 30 metres of topographic prominence:

1. Walton Hill (315.6m)
2. The Four Stones (309m)
3. Beacon Hill (298m)
4. Chapman's Hill (287m)
5. Romsley Hill (282.3m)
6. Rednal Hill (268m)
7. Frankley Beeches (256m)
8. Wychbury Hill (224m)

== Gallery ==
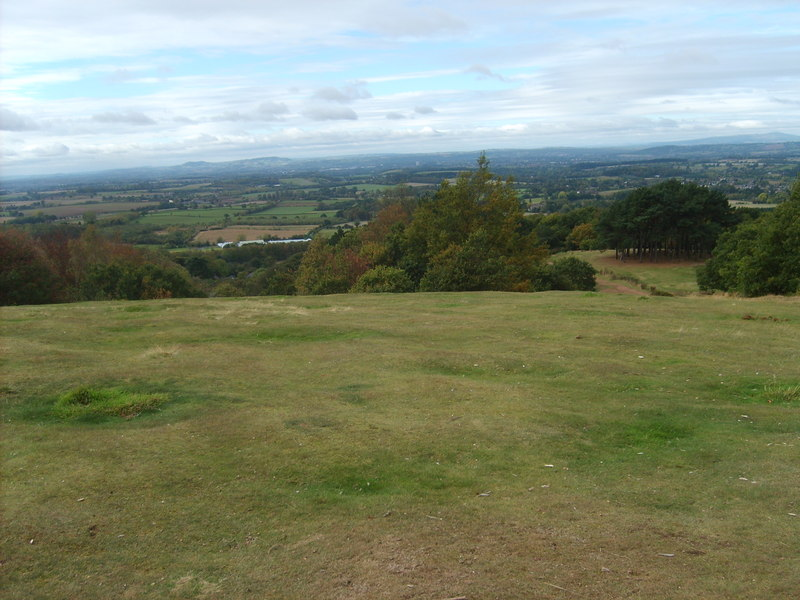
A view from near the highest point of the Hills

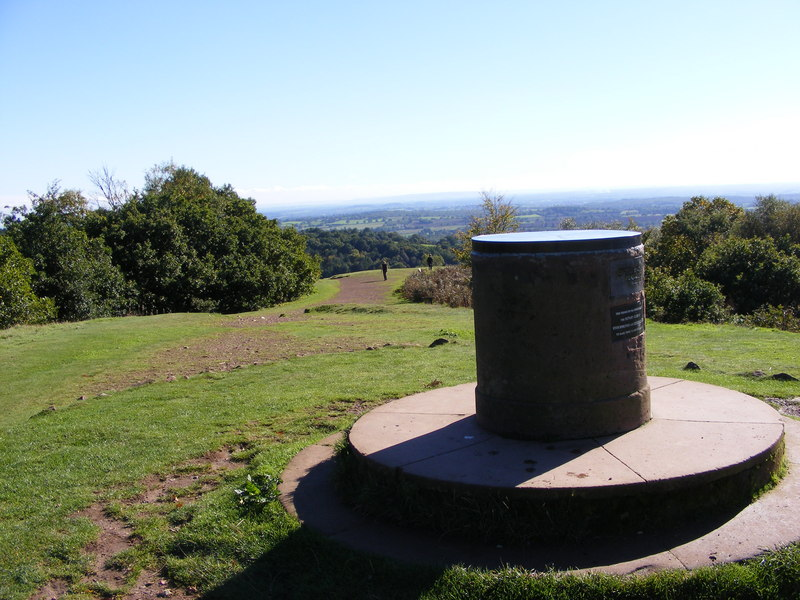
The toposcope near the Four Stones

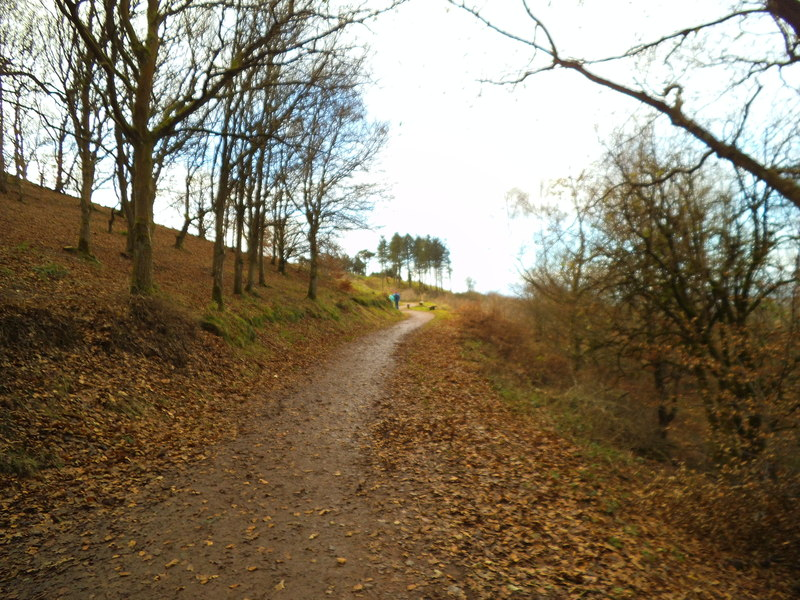
A path on the Hills' north side.

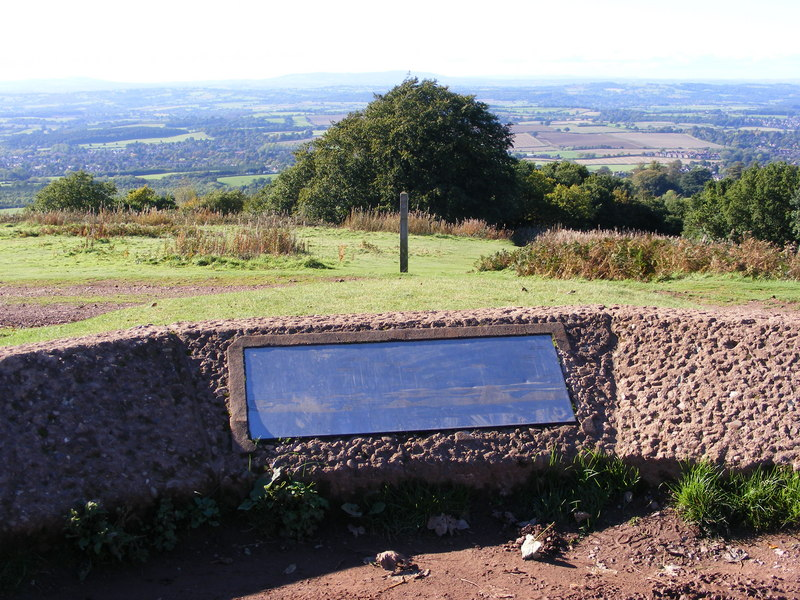
A viewpoint facing northwards from near the Four Stones

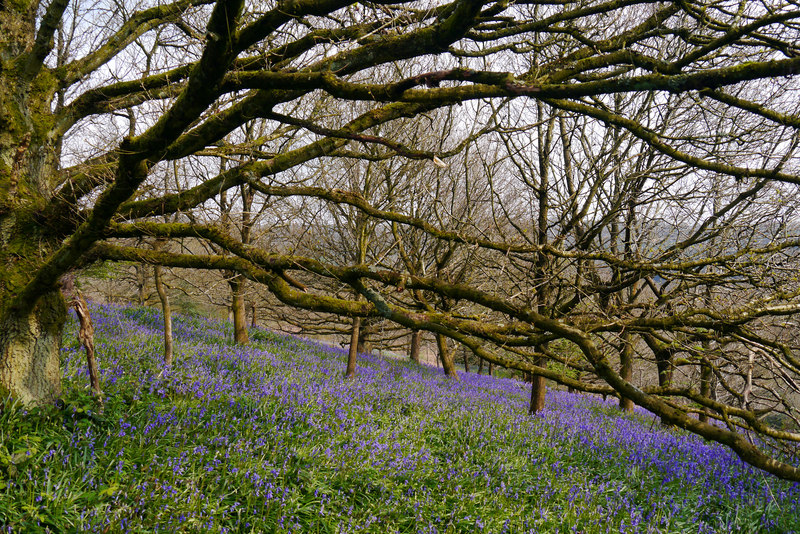
Bluebells on Clent Hill's southern slope

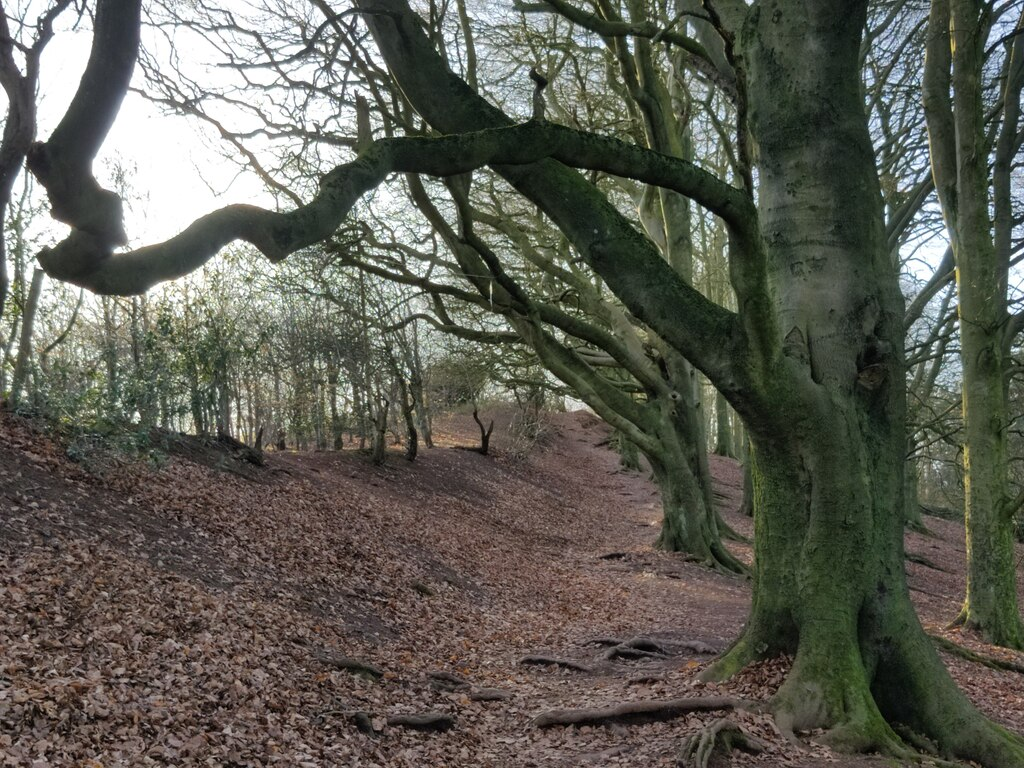
Trees to the east of the Four Stones
