= Romsley, Worcestershire =

Village in Worcestershire, England

Coordinates: 52.418°N 2.056°W

Romsley
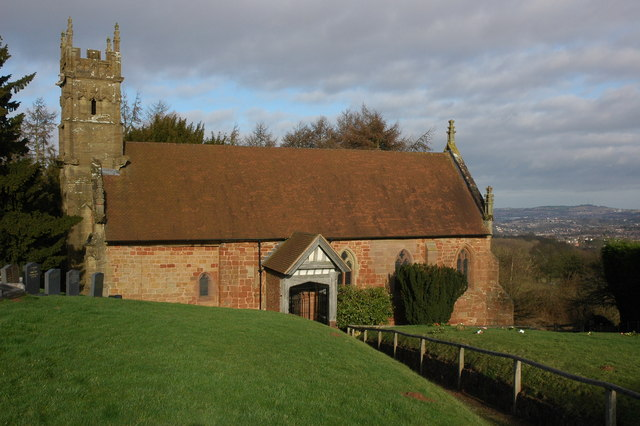
- St Kenelm's Church, Romsley

- Location within Worcestershire
- Population: 1,601 (2001)
- OS grid reference: SO963800
- Civil parish: Romsley
- District: Bromsgrove
- Shire county: Worcestershire
- Region: West Midlands
- Country: England
- Sovereign state: United Kingdom
- Post town: HALESOWEN
- Postcode district: B62
- Police: West Mercia
- Fire: Hereford and Worcester
- Ambulance: West Midlands
- UK Parliament: Bromsgrove

Romsley is a village and civil parish in the Bromsgrove District of Worcestershire, England, on the east side of the Clent Hills about 4 miles south of Halesowen. In 2001 it had a population of 1,601.

The name Romsley possibly derives from the Old English hræfnslēah, hramsalēah or rammslēah, meaning 'raven's wood/clearing', 'wild garlic wood/clearing' and 'ram's wood/clearing' respectively.

The parish church, dedicated to Saint Kenelm is a Grade I listed building. The nave of the church continues directly into the chancel, both are from the 12th century and built of red sandstone. A 15th-century tower is of greenish sandstone, and the church has a timber porch. The chancel is built over a crypt that once contained the shrine of St Kenelm. A spring marks the reputed site of his martyrdom.

The village and its area attract walkers, campers, and caravanners on the Clent and Walton Hills and on the Cuckoos Corner site. The main road that runs through Romsley is called Bromsgrove Road. There are limited local amenities including a post office, a butcher, a pub-restaurant, and a hairdresser.

The village is served by the 147 bus service which connects the village to Halesowen and Catshill. It is operated by Worcestershire County Council, but is to be taken over by Kev's Bus and extended to Bromsgrove Railway Station on 26 February 2018.

Romsley features in Geoffrey Hill's long poem The Triumph of Love:

Spraddled ridge –
village sacred to the boy-martyr,
Kenelm, his mouth full of blood and toffee.

== Gallery ==
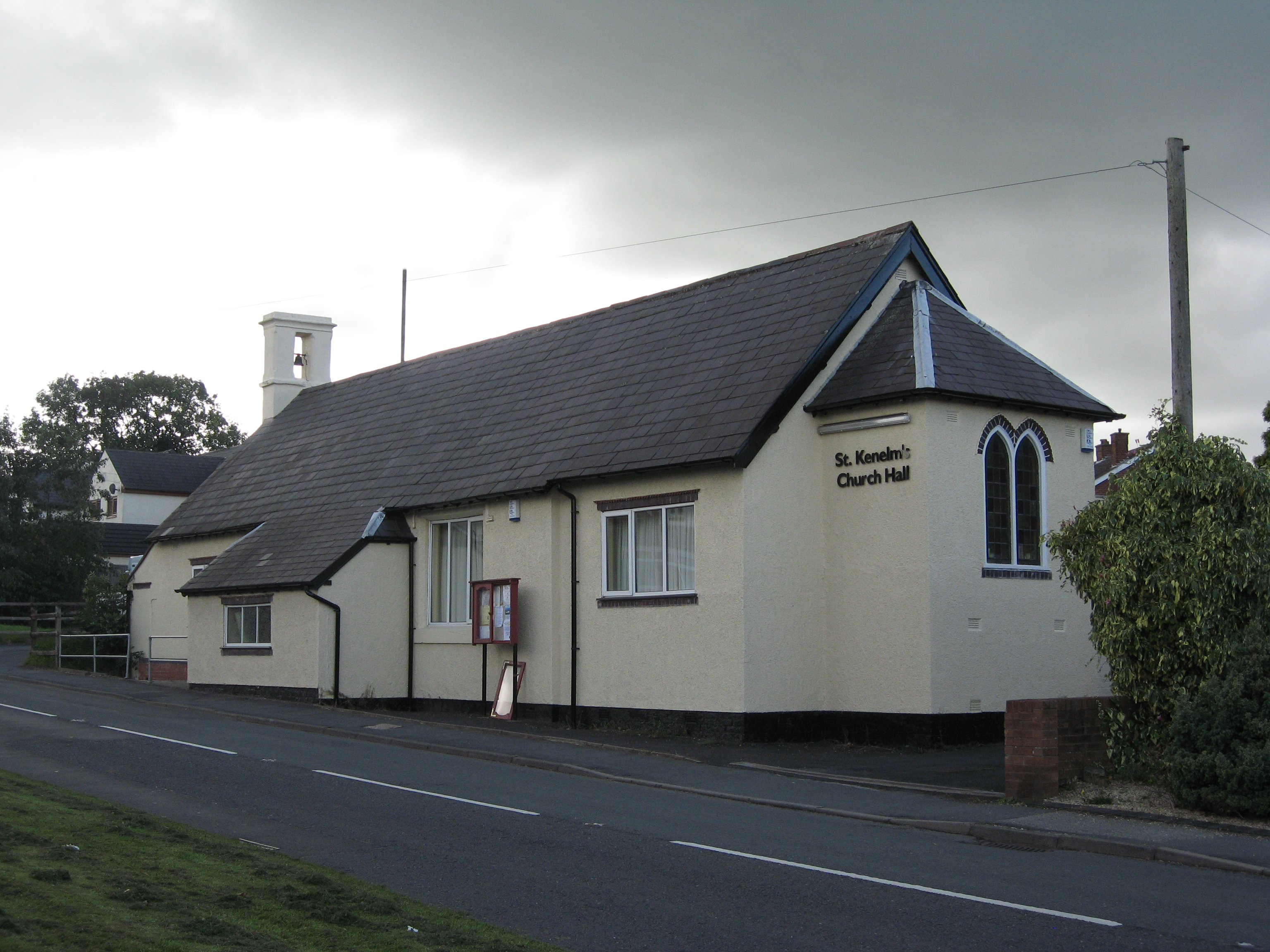
St Kenelm’s Church Hall in Romsley.

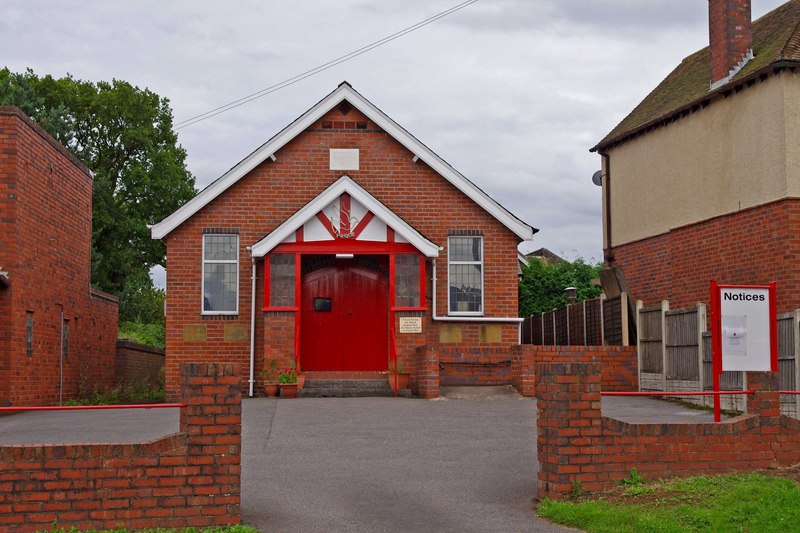
Romsley Methodist Church

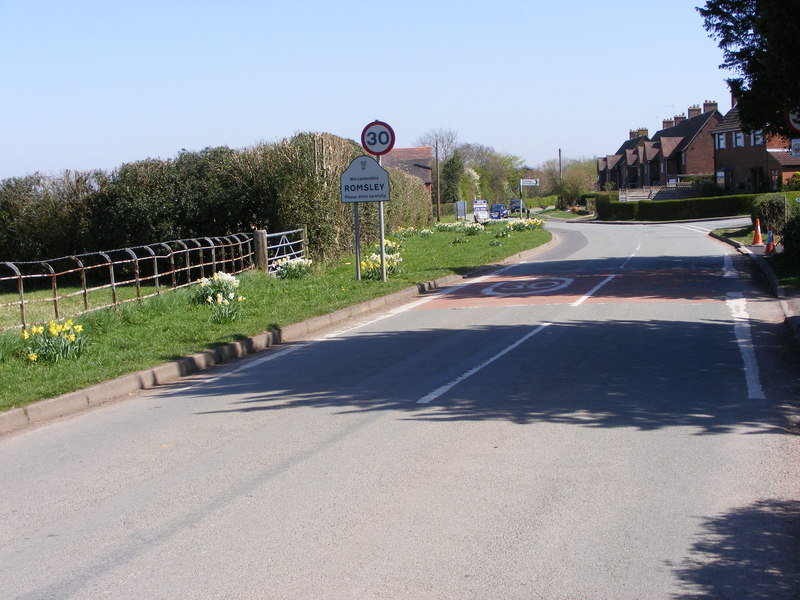
The Bromsgrove Road into Romsley from Halesowen.

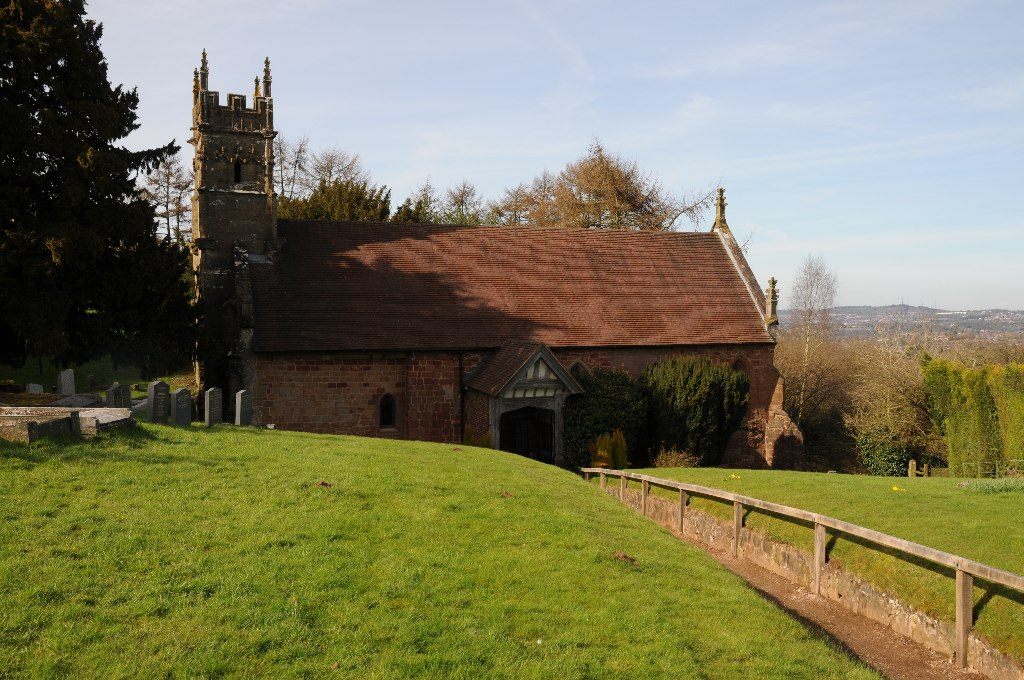
St Kenelm's Church, Romsley.
