= Saint Kenelm =

9th-century King of Mercia and saint

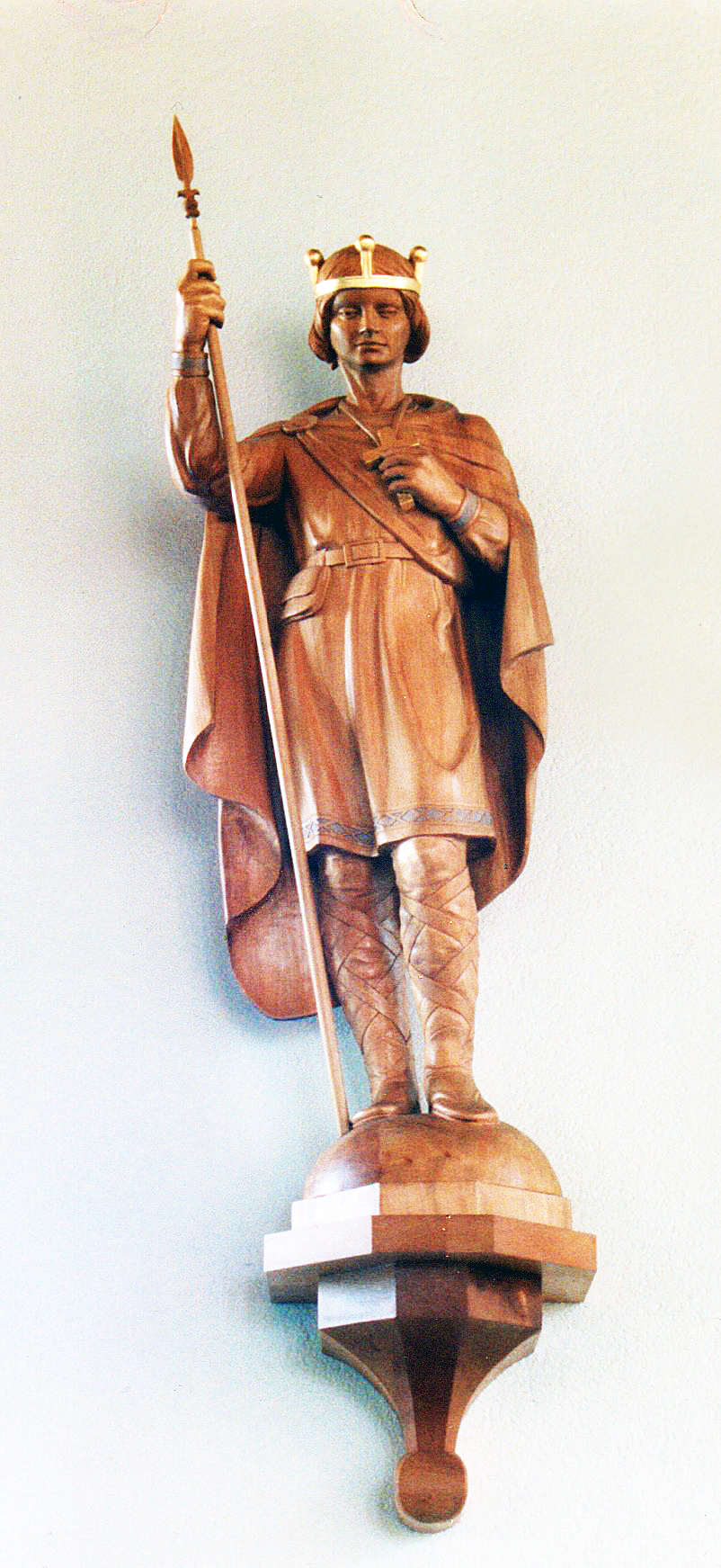
- Lime carving by Denis Alva Parsons in Our Lady and St Kenelm RC Church, Halesowen, West Midlands
- Born: c. 786
- Died: 17 July 821; Clent Hills
- Venerated in: Catholic Church; Anglican Communion; Eastern Orthodox Church
- Canonized: Pre-Congregation
- Major shrine: Winchcombe Abbey
- Feast: 17 July

Saint Kenelm (or Cynehelm) was an Anglo-Saxon saint, venerated throughout medieval England, and mentioned in the Canterbury Tales (The Nun's Priest's Tale, lines 290–301, in which the cockerel Chauntecleer tries to demonstrate the reality of prophetic dreams to his wife Pertelote). William of Malmesbury, writing in the 12th century, recounted that "there was no place in England to which more pilgrims travelled than to Winchcombe [in Gloucestershire] on Kenelm's feast day".

In legend, St Kenelm was a member of the royal family of Mercia, a boy king and martyr, murdered by an ambitious relative despite receiving a prophetic dream warning him of the danger. His body, after being concealed, was discovered by miraculous intervention, and transported by the monks of Winchcombe to a major shrine. There it remained for several hundred years.

The two locales most closely linked to this legend are the Clent Hills, south of Birmingham, England, identified as the scene of his murder, and the small Gloucestershire town of Winchcombe, near Cheltenham, where his body was interred. The small church of St Kenelm, dating from the 12th century in a village called Kenelstowe, now stands with a handful of houses within the larger village of Romsley in the Clent Hills. For many years, villagers celebrated St Kenelm's Day (17 July) with a village fair and the ancient custom of "crabbing the parson" - bombarding the unfortunate cleric with a volley of crab apples.

== The Legend of St Kenelm ==
=== Winchcombe Abbey ===
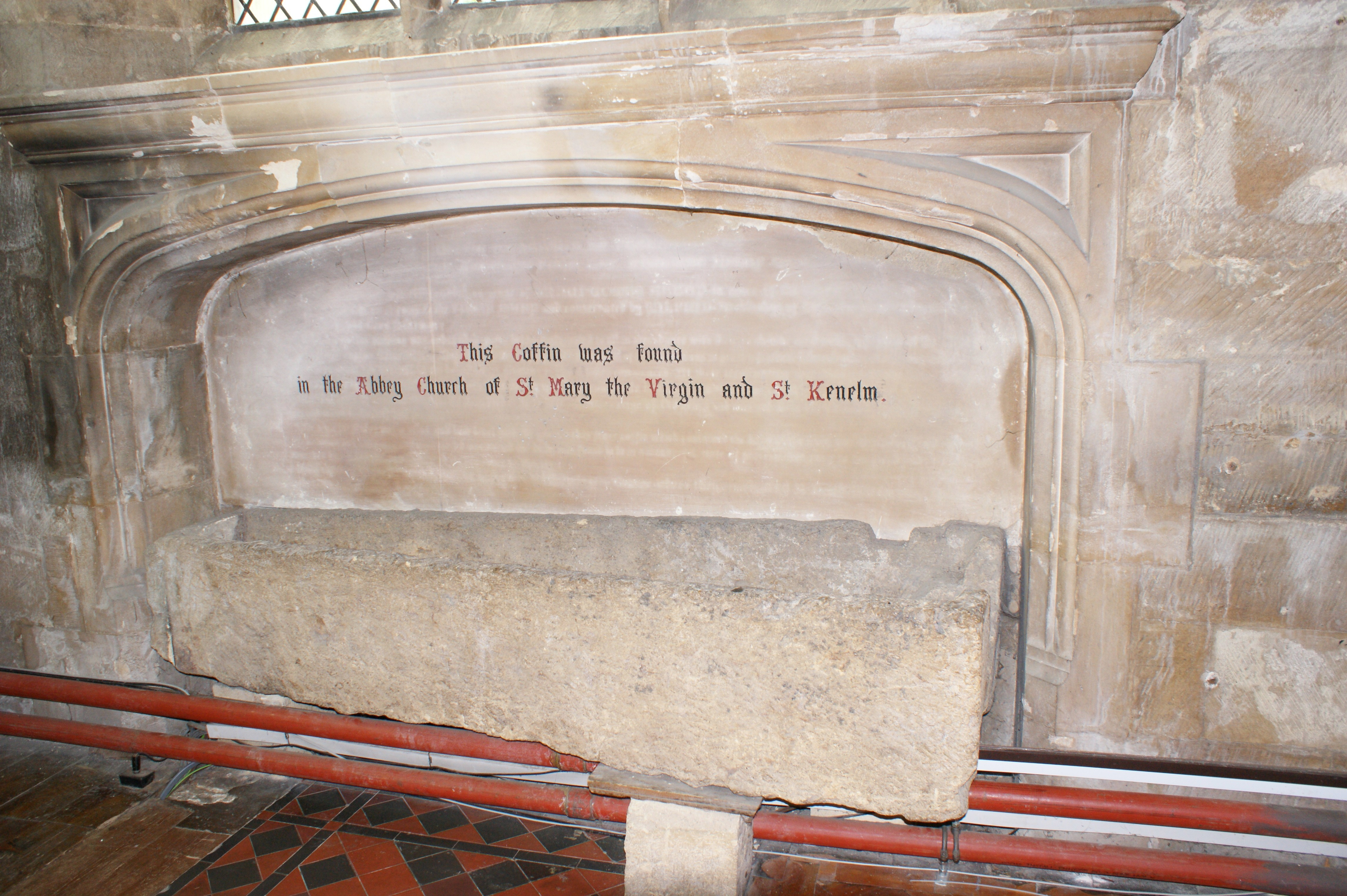
A stone coffin, supposedly that of St Kenelm, formerly at Winchcombe Abbey Church, now at St Peter's Church, Winchcombe

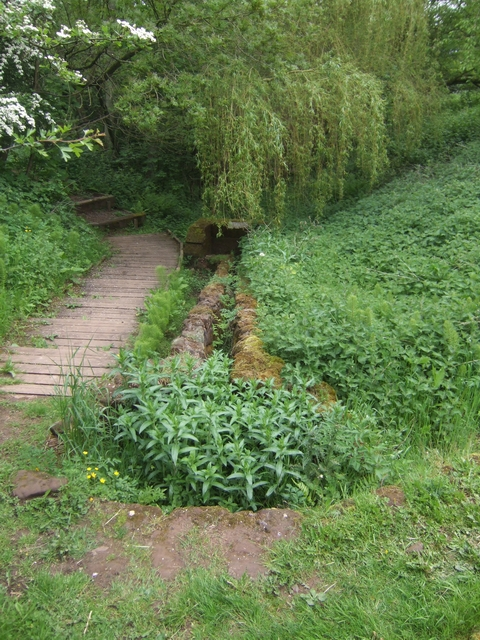
St Kenelm's Spring next to the Church on the Clent Hills, (one of the headwaters of the River Stour)

The earliest account of St Kenelm's legend lies in a manuscript copy from the 12th century at Winchcombe Abbey, which claims to be derived from an account given by a Worcester monk named Wilfin. Other accounts in chronicles are evidently derived from the same source. The story told by that manuscript is as follows:

In AD 819 (or 821?), Coenwulf of Mercia died, leaving two daughters, Quendryda (Cwenthryth) and Burgenhilda, and a son, a child of seven years old, named Kenelm, who was chosen to succeed him. Quendryda envied her little brother and thought that if he were killed, she might reign as Queen. She therefore conspired with her lover, Askobert, her brother's tutor and guardian, and gave him money, saying, 'Slay my brother for me, that I may reign'. In the Forests of Worcestershire, on a hunting trip, the opportunity arose.

The night before the hunting trip, Kenelm had a dream in which he climbed a large tree decorated with flowers and lanterns. From on high, he saw all four quarters of his kingdom. Three bowed down before him, but the fourth began to chop away at the tree until it fell. Then Kenelm transformed into a white bird and flew away to safety. On waking, the young king related his dream to his nanny, a wise old woman skilled in interpreting dreams. She wept, for she knew that the boy was destined to die.

In the middle of the hunt's first day, young Kenelm, tired and hot, decided to lie down beneath a tree to rest. Askobert began to dig a grave, in preparation for the murder, but the boy suddenly awoke and admonished him, 'You think to kill me here in vain, for I shall be slain in another spot. In token, thereof, see this rod blossom'. As he thrust his stick into the ground, it instantly took root and began to flower. It grew, in years after, to be a great ash tree, which was known as St Kenelm's Ash. Unperturbed by this turn of events, Askobert took the little king up to the Clent Hills, and as the child began to sing the Te Deum, the assassin smote his head clean off and buried him where he fell.

Kenelm's soul rose in the form of a dove carrying a scroll, and flew away to Rome where it dropped the scroll at the feet of the Pope. The message on the scroll read: 'Low in a mead of kine under a thorn, of head bereft, lieth poor Kenelm king-born', or, according the Golden Legend:

In Clent in cowbage, Kenelm, king born
Lieth under a thorn,
His head off shorn.

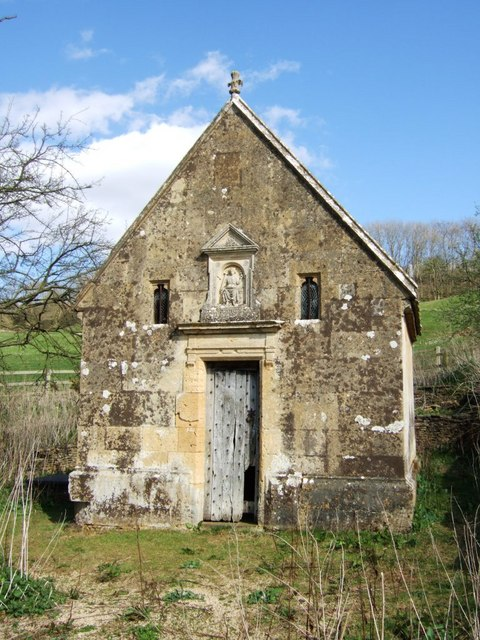
St Kenelm's Well, on hill overlooking Winchcombe. Supposed site of the miraculous spring

Accordingly, the Pope wrote to the Archbishop of Canterbury, who commissioned a party from the Mercian capital, Winchcombe, to seek the body. As they walked, they saw a pillar of light shining over a thicket in Worcestershire and beneath it the body of Kenelm. As it was taken up, a rushing fountain burst out of the ground, and flowed away into a stream, which brought health to anyone who drank from it. The body was then solemnly carried towards Winchcombe, but at the ford called Pyriford over the River Avon, the burial party was met by an armed band from Worcester Abbey who also claimed title to the remains. The dispute was settled as follows: whichever party woke first on the following morning could take the prize. This proved to be the monks from Winchcombe. Despite their agreement, however, they were closely pursued by the Worcester party. Exhausted from their rapid march, they stopped just within sight of Winchcombe Abbey. As they struck their staffs into the ground, a spring burst forth, and this refreshed them so that they were able to press on to the Royal Mercian Abbey at Winchcombe, where the bells sounded and rang without the hand of man.

Then Quendryda asked what all this ringing meant and was told how her brother's body was brought in procession into the abbey. 'If that be true,' said she, 'may both my eyes fall upon this book', and then both her eyes fell out of her head upon the Psalter she was reading. Soon after, both she and her lover died wretchedly, and their bodies were cast out into a ditch. The remains of Saint Kenelm were buried with all honour and he has since been revered as a martyr. His feast day is celebrated on 17 July, the date of his translation to Winchcombe.

=== South English Legendary ===
The legend of Saint Kenelm is included in a medieval collection of saints' lives in Middle English known as the South English Legendary, compiled during the 13th and 14th centuries. It tells a similar story to the one in the 12th-century manuscript at Winchcombe Abbey, with the following addition: after the murder and secret burial of Saint Kenelm in the Clent Hills, a cow came and miraculously sat at Kenelm's grave, eating nothing all day and returning each night with her udders full. Quendryda had forbidden her murdered brother's name ever to be spoken, and as the memory of him faded, God caused this cow to sit there so that his memory would not disappear entirely. Everybody in the district grew to learn of this cow's strange behaviour. The animal was closely observed, seen to sit by a thorn tree and eat nothing all day but to be miraculously full of milk in the evening and again in the morning, and this went on for many years. The valley came to be known as Cowbach. Then one day, a white dove flew down into the Pope's chapel in Rome carrying a message that Saint Kenelm's body lay in a place called Cowbach, in the Clent Hills. Word was dispatched to Archbishop Wulfred of Canterbury, and a party was sent into Worcestershire, where the local population were able to guess immediately where the body lay, because of the cow. When his body was disinterred, a spring miraculously appeared where Saint Kenelm had lain, as in the Winchcombe version, which is now followed faithfully once more.

== Factual records of Kenelm's life ==
Like many medieval hagiographies, St Kenelm's legend appears to bear little relation to any known facts. It can be ascertained from the wider historical record that, on the death of Offa of Mercia, his son Ecgfrith of Mercia was crowned but his reign lasted only 20 weeks and he was presumably killed in battle. He was succeeded by a distant cousin, Coenwulf of Mercia, whose son was Kenelm (Cynehelm), and this would appear to be the reputed saint. It is likely that Coenwulf 'hallowed' Kenelm to the throne, for a letter dated 798, allegedly from Pope Leo III to "King Kenelm", names Kenelm and gives his age as 12. In 799, Kenelm witnessed a deed of gift of land to Christ Church, Canterbury, and from 803 onwards his name appears on a variety of charters. His name disappears from charters for a time after 811, which has led to the belief that he died then. However, he reappears as a subscriber to his father's last charter dated 821, identified as "Kenelmus, son of the king", from this we know he still lived in 821. Therefore, while Kenelm may have died in 821 as legend dictates, he was about 35 years old when he died, not a mere child of 7 years. Historical records also indicate that Kenelm's sister, Cwenthryth (Quendryda), had entered the cloister at the time of her father's death and was the abbess of Minster-in-Thanet.

== Other associations with St Kenelm ==
=== Churches ===
There are eight Anglican Churches dedicated to St Kenelm:

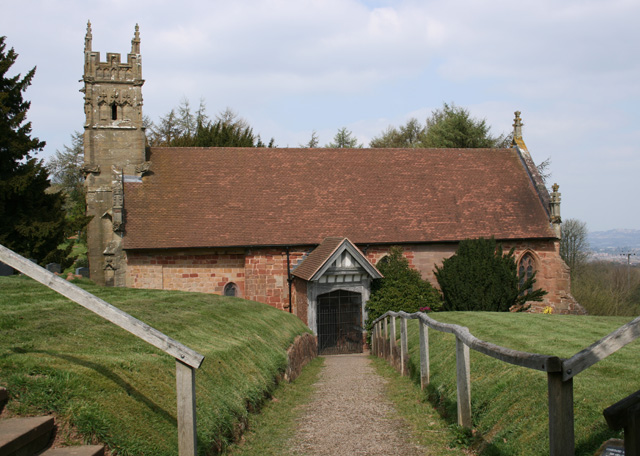
1. St Kenelm's Church, Clent Hills, Worcestershire

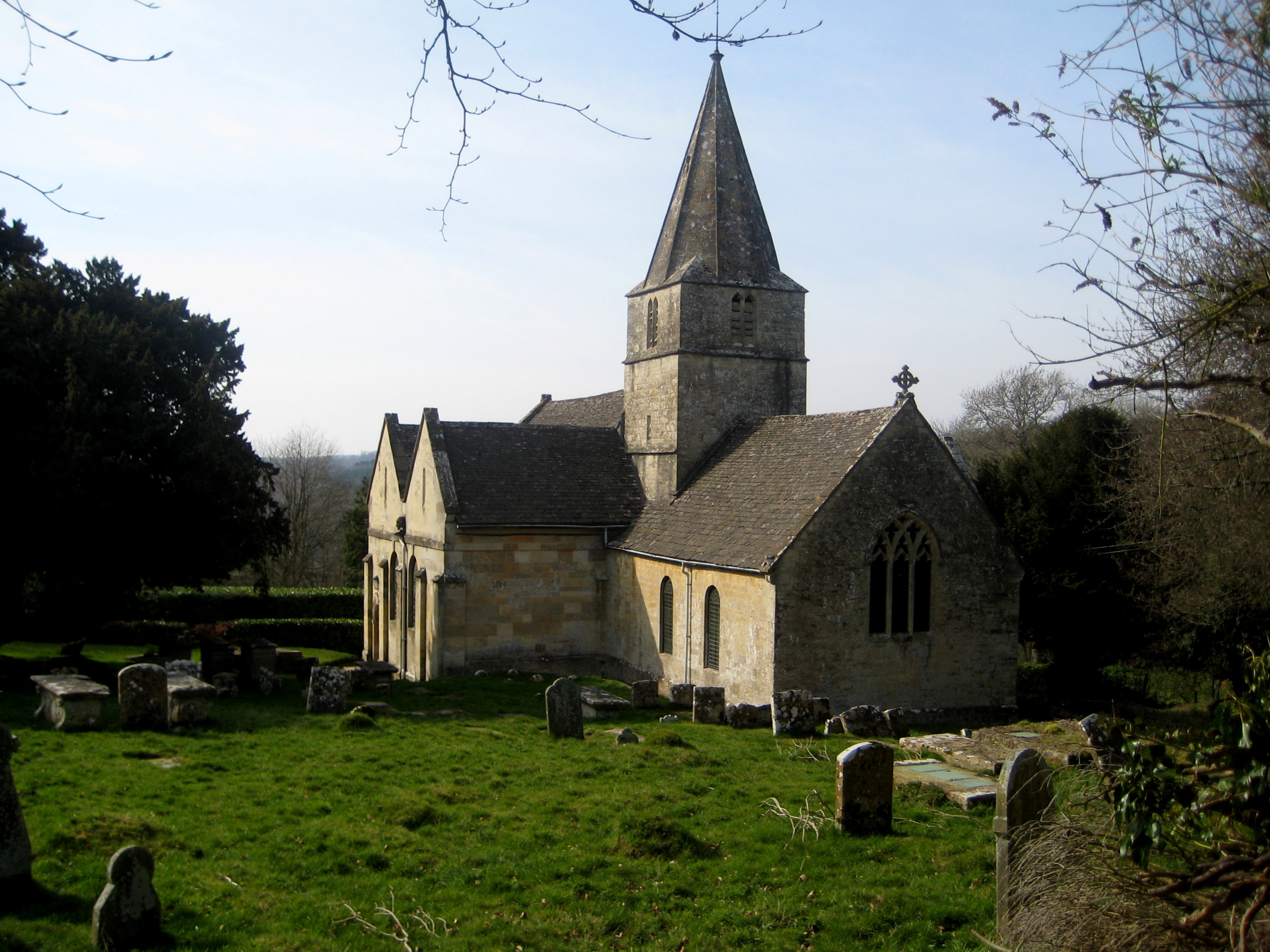
2. St Kenelm's Church, Sapperton, Gloucestershire (Redundant)

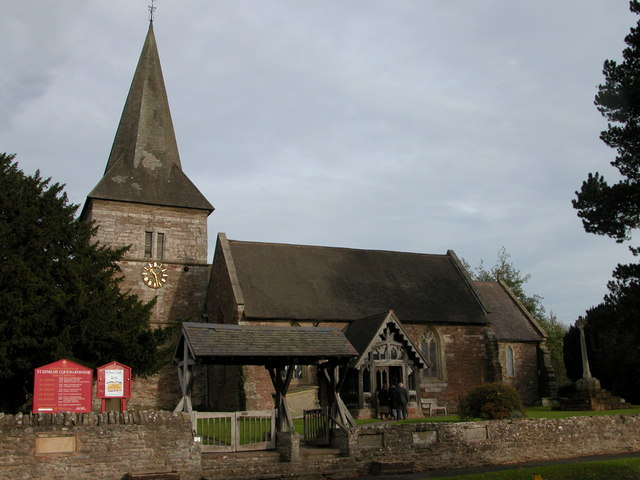
3. St Kenelm's Church, Clifton-upon-Teme, Worcestershire

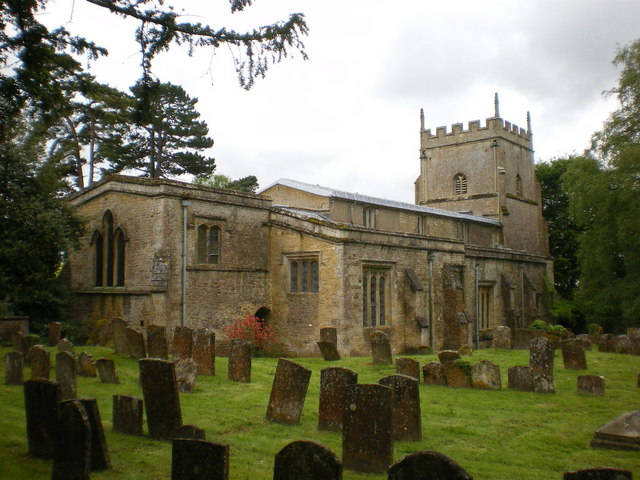
4. St Kenelm's Church, Enstone, Oxfordshire

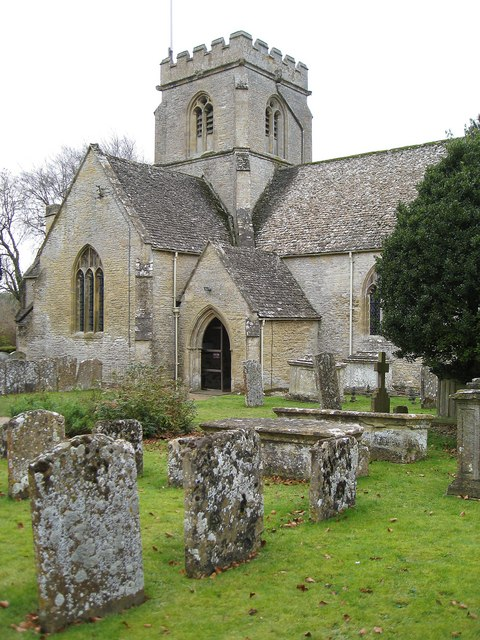
5. St Kenelm's, Church, Minster Lovell, Oxfordshire

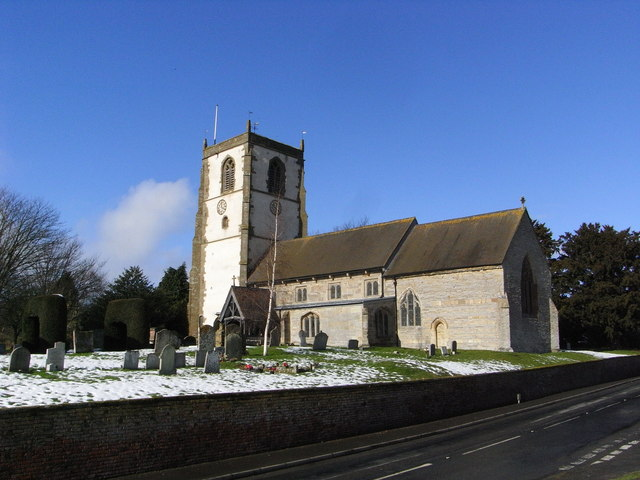
6. St Kenelm's Church, Upton Snodsbury, Worcestershire

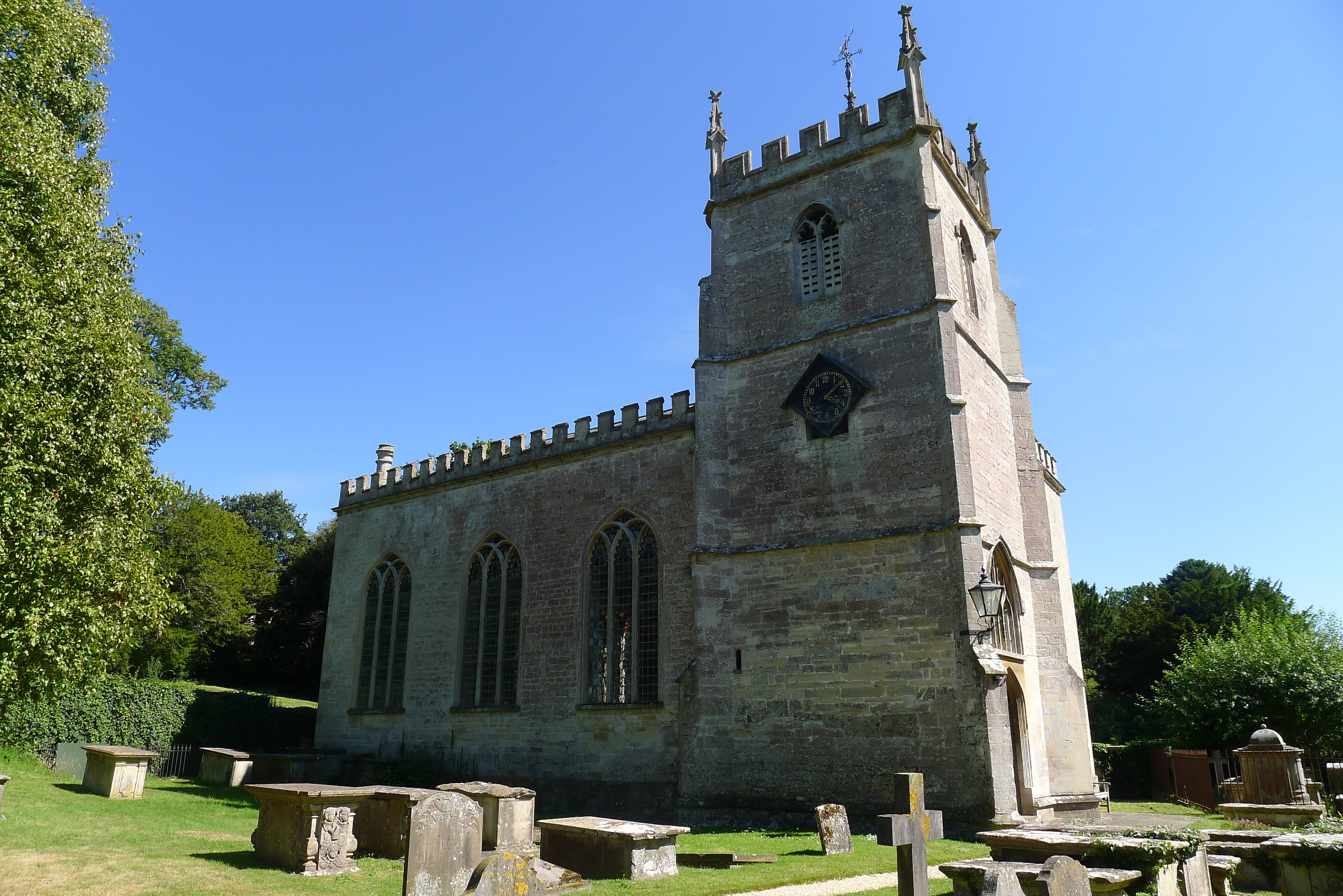
7. St Kenelm's Church, Alderley, Gloucestershire

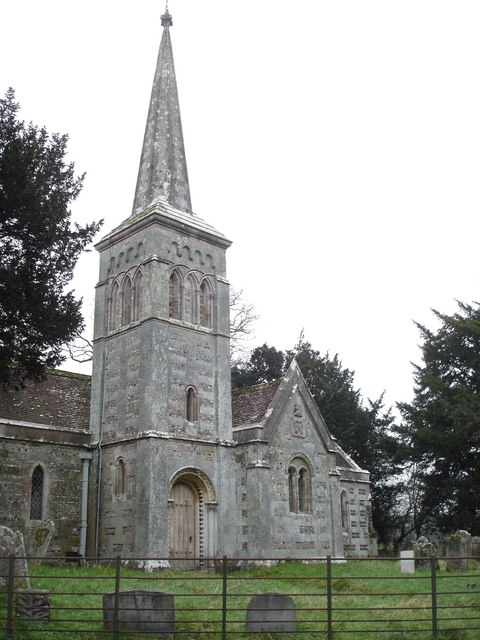
8. St Kenelm's Church, Stanbridge, Dorset (Redundant)

In addition, there are two Roman Catholic Churches dedicated to Our Lady and St Kenelm. These are located at Halesowen (near The Clent Hills) and at Stow-on-the-Wold (near Winchcombe).

In 2023, a pastoral area of the Roman Catholic Diocese of Clifton was named in honour of Kenelm.

=== Literature ===
- St Kenelm is alluded to in Chaucer's The Nun's Priest's Tale:

Why in the 'Life' of Saint Kenelm I read
Who was Kenelphus' son, the noble king
Of Mercia, how Kenelm dreamed a thing
A while before he was murdered, so they say,
His own death in a vision saw, one day.
His nurse interpreted, as records tell,
That vision, bidding him to guard him well
From treason; but he was but seven years old,
And therefore 'twas but little he'd been told
Of any dream, so holy was his heart.
By God! I'd rather than retain my shirt
That you had read this legend, as have I.

- His tale is told in one of William Shenstone's elegies.
- Francis Brett Young wrote a long poem called The Ballad of St Kenelm, AD 821; this was later set to music by Andrew Downes for a commission by the Frances Brett Young Society,
- Geoffrey Hill makes direct mention of St Kenelm and Romsley, Worcestershire, in his book-length poem,The Triumph of Love (1997).

=== Walks ===
There are two long-distance walks commemorating the life of St Kenelm, both linking Clent and Winchcombe, but using differing routes. One is known as St Kenelm's Trail, the other as St Kenelm's Way.
