= Edward Griffiths (cricketer) =

English cricketer

Personal information
- Born: 17 March 1862; Winchcombe, Gloucestershire
- Died: 20 April 1893 (aged 31); Cheltenham, Gloucestershire
- Batting: Right-handed

Domestic team information
- Years: Team
- 1885-1889: Gloucestershire
- Source: Cricinfo, 1 April 2014

Edward Griffiths (17 March 1862 – 20 April 1893) was an English cricketer. He played for Gloucestershire between 1885 and 1889.
