= St Kenelm's Trail =

English walking route

St Kenelm's Trail is a walk originally devised by John Price, which links the two places most commonly associated with the legend of St Kenelm. These are the Clent Hills, south of Birmingham, identified as the scene of his supposed murder and the small Gloucestershire town of Winchcombe, near Cheltenham where his body was eventually interred.

This trail links these places and recalls the journey recorded as being taken by the monks of St. Peter's Abbey, Winchcombe, with the Saint's remains.

It is a journey which visits several ancient villages and passes by many places of historic interest such as the picturesque, historic yet obscure Huddington Court and concludes with a spectacular finish through the grounds of the more famous Sudeley Castle.
