= Richard Eedes (divine) =

Richard Eedes (died 1686) was an English Presbyterian minister and author.

== Life ==
Eedes was born at Feckenham, Worcestershire. He went to Corpus Christi College, Oxford, in 1626, graduated B.A. in February 1629, and took the curacy of Bishop's Cleeve, Gloucestershire, at Michaelmas 1632. He proceeded M.A. 17 March 1634. He continued at Bishop's Cleeve as a conforming cleric, until the outbreak of the English Civil War, when he subscribed to the Solemn League and Covenant. About 1647 he became vicar of Beckford, near Bishop's Cleeve, where he remained until 1658.

By the persuasion of a parliamentary officer who had a farm in Bishop's Cleeve, he returned to his old curacy there in the hope of succeeding to the rectory. From his published sermons it is evident that he had tired of presbyterianism and longed for the king's return. Immediately after the Restoration he delivered an ultra-loyal harangue on the text, "As whatsoever the king did pleased all the people" before the mayor and aldermen of Gloucester, but all his attempts to conciliate the court party proved unavailing. He remained at Bishop's Cleeve as minister until the Act of Uniformity 1662. He refused then to conform, and silenced himself; but he continued to attend services of the church.

Some years before his death he moved to Gretton, in the parish of Winchcomb, Gloucestershire, where he died in the beginning of April 1686, and was buried on the 6th in the middle of the north side of Bishop's Cleeve Church in the presence of a large crowd.

== Works ==
Eedes was the author of:

- Great Salvation by Jesus Christ, a sermon (on Hebrews ii. 3), London, 1656
- Christ exalted and Wisdom justified; or, the Saints' Esteem of Jesus Christ, as most precious, handled; and their wise Choice and Subjection to Him as their Lord and Saviour vindicated (London, 1659), recommended by Richard Baxter
- Great Britain's Resurrection; or, England's Complacencie in her Royal Soveraign King Charles the Second. A sermon [on 2 Sam. iii. 36] preached in the Lecture at Gloucester, 5 June 1660, London, 1660
- Sermon (on 1 Peter ii. 7).
