= Tewkesbury Museum =

Local museum in Tewkesbury, England

Coordinates: 51.9926°N 2.1553°W

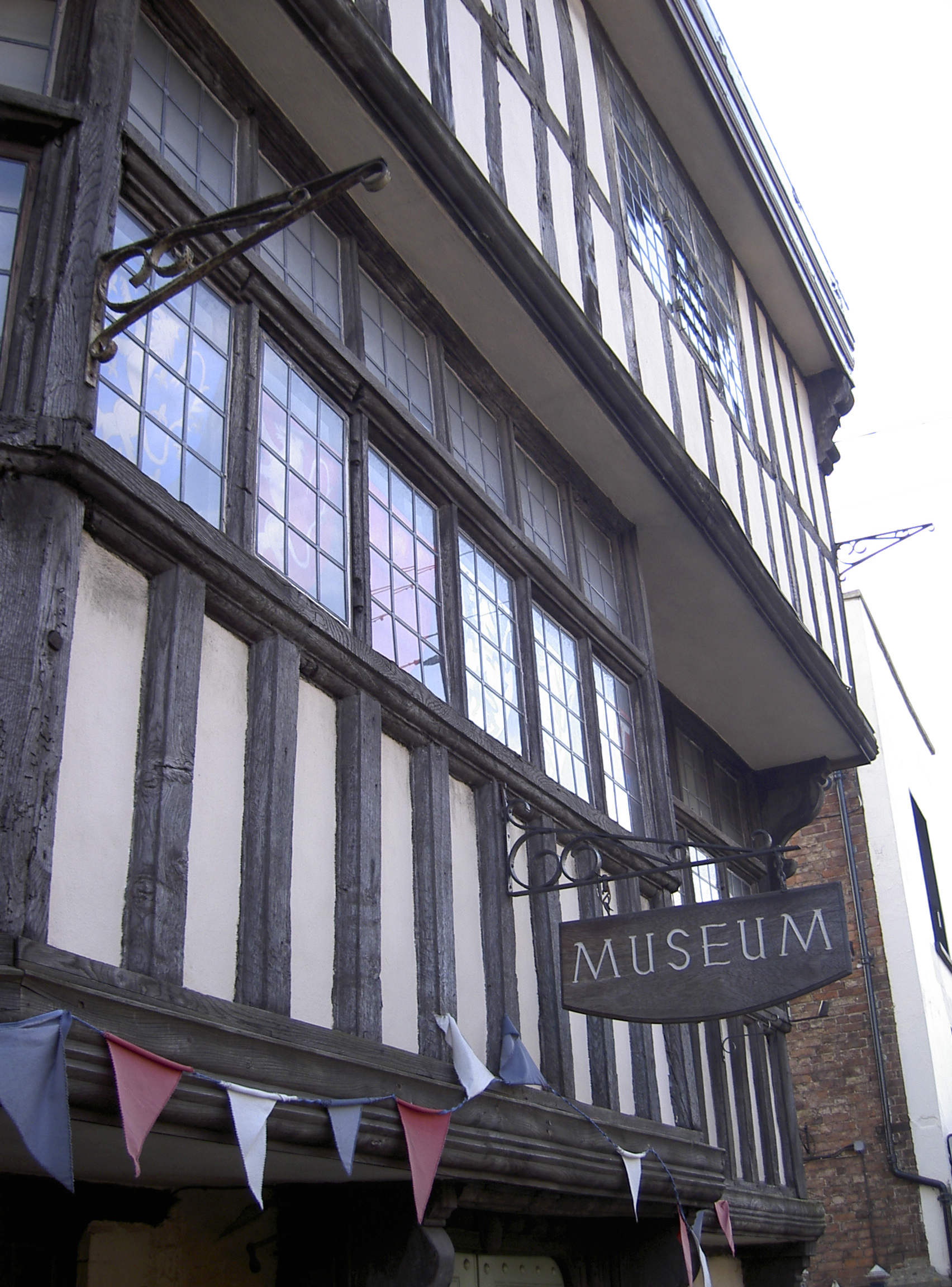
The Town Museum, Tewkesbury

Tewkesbury Museum is a small community museum dedicated to the social history and heritage of Tewkesbury in Gloucestershire, England.

The museum is housed in a 17th-century half-timbered building at 64 and 64a Barton Street, in property which was given to the Borough of Tewkesbury in 1956 on the express condition that it be used as a museum. However the museum did not open until 1962, after all of the previous tenants of the building had left. Complications introduced by local government reform in 1974 almost led to its demise. The ancient Borough of Tewkesbury was dissolved and incorporated into the new District Council covering North West Gloucestershire. The first Clerk for the new Council persuaded Councillors that it should be named Tewkesbury Borough and he transferred as much of the old Borough as he could to the new Borough. This included an attempt to transfer the Museum. After some legal advice, the Museum reverted to the Town Council’s control.

The building is Grade II* listed by English Heritage.

An active society of Friends of Tewkesbury Museum supports the work of the museum.

== Exhibits ==
Exhibits include:

- Early Roman artefacts discovered when the Roses Theatre in Tewkesbury was built, including a Roman skeleton
- A diorama of the Battle of Tewkesbury
- Exhibits about the Tewkesbury mop fair
- A 1950s vintage model funfair
- Pieces relating to the Antarctic explorer Raymond Priestley, from Bredon's Norton

In 2010 excerpts from the diary of the British soldier Lieutenant Mark Evison of the Welsh Guards, who died after being wounded in Afghanistan in 2009, were displayed at the museum alongside letters from previous generations of soldiers.

== See also ==
- List of museums in Gloucestershire
