= John Kingsley Cook =

English artist and engraver (1911–1994)

- Born: 1911; Winchcombe, Gloucestershire
- Died: 1994 (aged 82–83)
- Known for: Engraving, painting

John Kingsley Cook (1911-1994) was an English artist, teacher and wood engraver.

== Biography ==
Cook was born in Winchcombe in Gloucestershire in 1911, son of Henry Arnold Cook, a Congregational minister. In 1913, on Henry's appointment as minister of Rook Lane Chapel, the family relocated to Frome in Somerset. John attended Frome School of Art and Science, where he excelled, being described by the local newspaper as a "brilliant pupil". He left in 1928 to attend the Royal Academy Schools in London, where he was taught by both Walter Thomas Monnington and Walter Westley Russell. At the RA, Cook won a gold medal and a travelling scholarship. He went on to study at the Central School of Art and Crafts, specialising in wood engraving under the direction of Noel Rooke. In 1939, for the book publisher Harrap, he illustrated The Teamsmen by Crichton Porteous.

During World War II, Cook served as a wireless operator in the Merchant Navy. Cook was shipwrecked in October 1941 and spent several days in an open boat in the Mediterranean when his ship, the Empire Guillemot, en route from Malta, was attacked and sunk. Cook was then held captive in prisoner-of-war camps in Algeria for a year until the Allied landings in North Africa liberated the camps. Both while at sea and in the camps, Cook continued to sketch and, when possible, paint. In due course, the War Artists' Advisory Committee acquired some nine examples of these works and they are now held in the Imperial War Museum in London. After a period of recuperation, Cook rejoined the Merchant Navy and served on refuelling tankers in the Mediterranean until the war ended.

When his war service ended in 1945, Cook settled in Edinburgh and taught graphic design and engraving at the Edinburgh College of Art, where he also lectured on the history of art.

In 1958 he created the mosaic wall at the Lady Altar in the newly built St Teresa's Church in Dumfries. Working in situ and with three assistants, it was completed in three weeks.

In 1960 he was appointed Head of Design at the College, a post he held until his retirement in 1971. In Edinburgh, Cook had a number of solo exhibitions at both the Demarco Gallery and at Open Eye Gallery but also showed in London including at the Gallery Upstairs at the Royal Academy. Cook toured a show of images called Microcosm and also produced a volume of poems and wood engravings entitled Aftermath, based on drawings made in Bristol and London after war-time air raids on those cities. Cook added a postscript, entitled The Greening to the volume in 1984. Later in life, Cook turned to a more abstract style of painting and also created large works on ecological themes.

A memorial show to Cook was held in 1995 at the Edinburgh College of Art and a retrospective exhibition was held at the Open Eye Gallery in 1999. Cook's wartime sketches were included in the War Artists At Sea exhibition mounted at the National Maritime Museum in Greenwich in 2014. A number of retrospective drawings Cook made, in the 1960s, of his wartime experiences are also held at Greenwich.
