= Winchcombe =

Market town and civil parish in Gloucestershire, England

Coordinates: 51.955°N 1.965°W

- St Peter's Parish Church

- Location within Gloucestershire
- Population: 5,121 (2021 Census)
- OS grid reference: SP025285
- District: Tewkesbury
- Shire county: Gloucestershire
- Region: South West
- Country: England
- Sovereign state: United Kingdom
- Post town: CHELTENHAM
- Postcode district: GL54
- Dialling code: 01242
- Police: Gloucestershire
- Fire: Gloucestershire
- Ambulance: South Western
- UK Parliament: Tewkesbury

Winchcombe (/ˈwɪntʃkəm/) is a market town and civil parish in the Borough of Tewkesbury in the county of Gloucestershire, England, situated 7 miles (11 km) northeast of Cheltenham. The population was recorded as 5,121 in the 2021 census, which was previously estimated at 5,347 in 2019. The town is located in the Cotswolds and has many features and buildings dating back to medieval times. In 2021 it was the primary strike site of the eponymous Winchcombe meteorite.

== History ==
The Belas Knap Neolithic long barrow on Cleeve Hill above Winchcombe, dates from about 3000 BCE. The name Winchcombe derives from the Old English wincelcumb meaning 'corner combe' (valley). In Anglo-Saxon times, Winchcombe was a major community in Mercia, favoured by King Coenwulf of Mercia, the others being Lichfield and Tamworth. In the 11th century, the town was briefly the county town of Winchcombeshire. The Anglo-Saxon St Kenelm, said to be a son of Coenwulf, is believed to be buried here.

During the Anarchy of the 12th century, a motte-and-bailey castle was built in the early 1140s for Empress Matilda, by Roger Fitzmiles, 2nd Earl of Hereford, but its exact site is unknown.

In the Restoration period, Winchcombe was noted for cattle rustling and other lawlessness, attributed in part to poverty. Local people seeking a living took to growing tobacco as a cash crop, although the practice had been outlawed since the Commonwealth period. Soldiers were sent in at least once to destroy the illegal crop.

Fragments of the Winchcombe Meteorite originating from the asteroid belt between Mars and Jupiter, fell on a house driveway on 28 February 2021. The meteorite is a rare carbonaceous chondrite, offering pristine material from the beginnings of the Solar System 4.6 billion years ago. This was preserved by its prompt collection by a local resident about 12 hours after falling to Earth. Another fragment was found by researchers on a local farm. Some of the meteorite fragments were put on display at the town museum.

== Attractions ==
Winchcombe started life as a Roman hamlet, rising to prominence as an Anglo-Saxon walled town containing Winchcombe Abbey, where a Mercian king and his saintly son were buried. Although the town wall has long vanished, Winchcombe retains much of its medieval layout, with a mixture of timber-framed and Cotswold limestone buildings along its High Street, some dating back to the 15th century.

Winchcombe's position on the Cotswold Way keeps it popular with walkers and history fans. Frequent visits are made to the heritage GWR steam railway that links it with Broadway and Cheltenham Racecourse, and with Sudeley Castle, the burial place of Queen Catherine Parr, which lies on the outskirts.

Sudely Castle also hosts the annual Fantasy Forest Festival, one of the largest Cosplay / Renaissance Faire festivals in the UK.

== Notable buildings ==
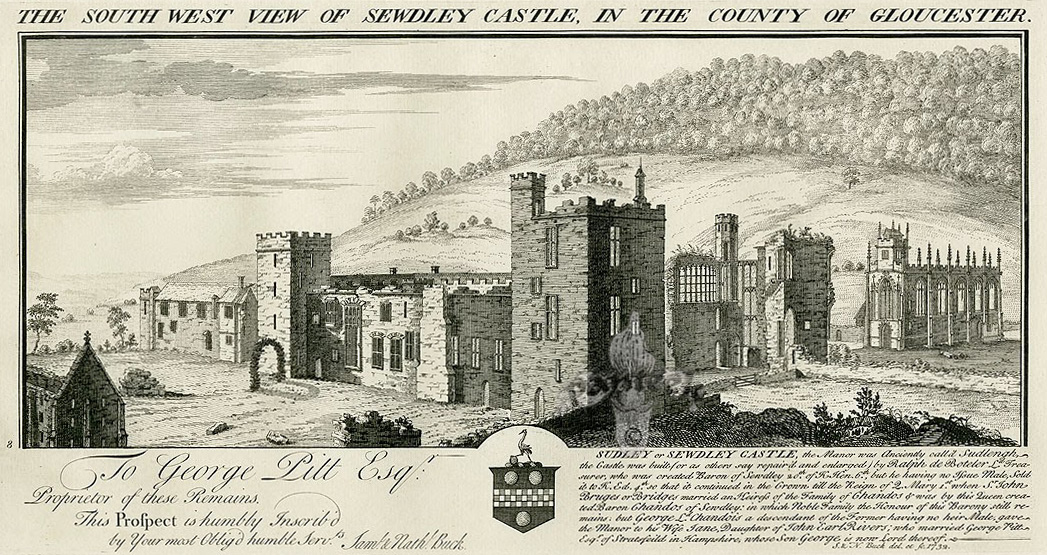
Sudeley Castle, 1726 engraving

Winchcombe and vicinity contain Sudeley Castle and the remains of Hailes Abbey, once a main place of pilgrimage, due to a phial said by the monks possessing it to contain the Blood of Christ. Nothing remains of Winchcombe Abbey. St Peter's Church in the centre of the town is noted for its grotesques.

Several buildings around Sudeley Hill are Grade II listed.

== Walks ==
Winchcombe is crossed by seven long-distance footpaths: The Cotswold Way, the Gloucestershire Way, the Wychavon Way, St Kenelm's Trail, St Kenelm's Way, the Warden's Way and the Windrush Way. Winchcombe became a member of the Walkers are Welcome network of towns in July 2009 and now holds a walking festival every May.

== Public transport ==
The town has bus services to Cheltenham, Broadway and Willersey.

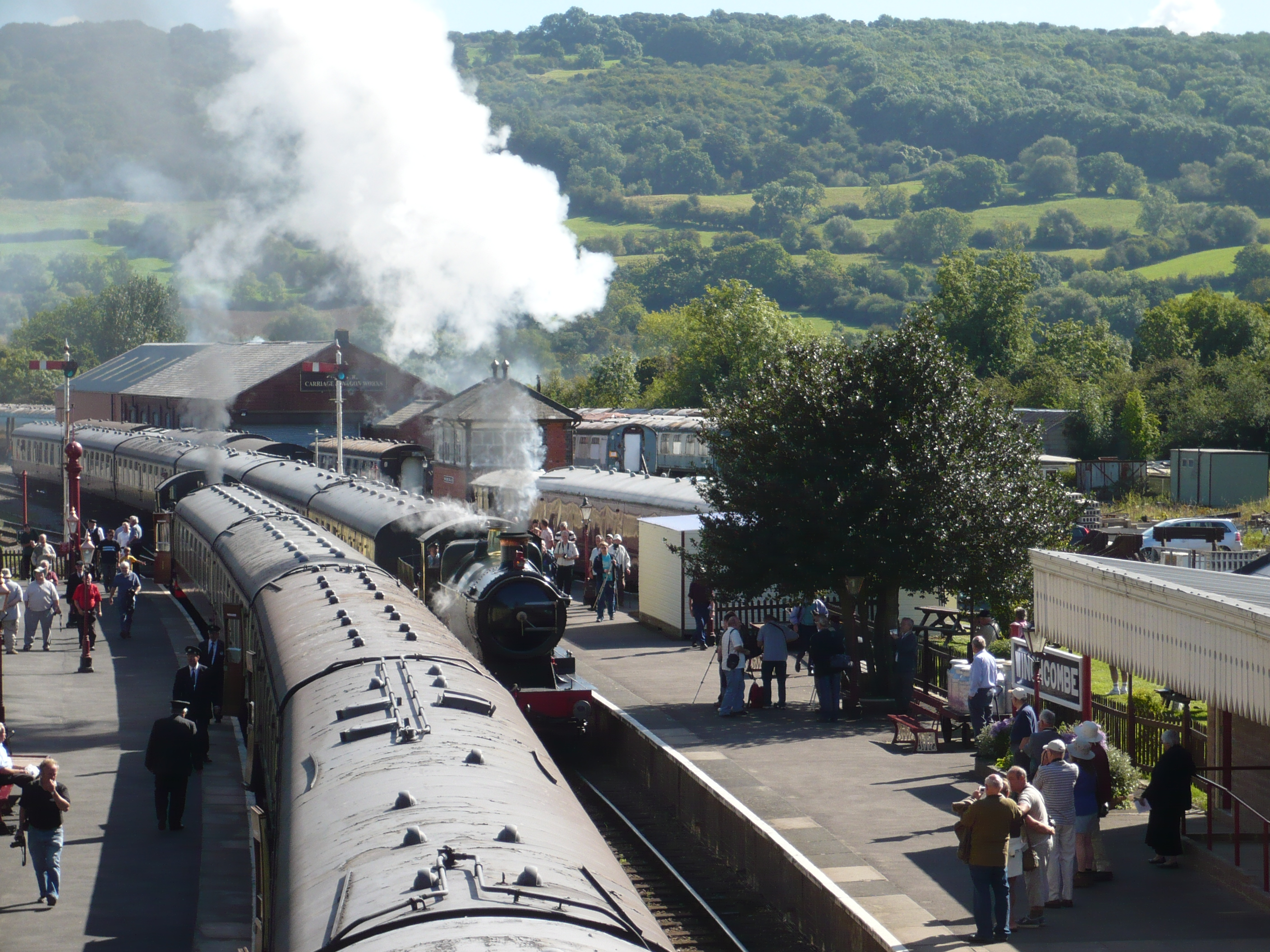
Winchcombe railway station

Winchcombe had a railway opened in 1906 by the Great Western Railway from Stratford-upon-Avon to Cheltenham as part of a main line from Birmingham to the South West and South Wales. Winchcombe railway station and most others on the section closed in March 1960. Through passenger trains continued until March 1968 and goods until 1976, when a derailment caused damage and it was decided to close the section. By the early 1980s it had been dismantled. The length between Toddington and Cheltenham Racecourse via Winchcombe has been reconstructed as the heritage Gloucestershire Warwickshire Railway. It was extended to Broadway in spring 2018. The new station building that opened at Winchcombe on its original site was brought from the former Monmouth Troy railway station. Nearby is the 693-yard (634 m) Greet Tunnel, the second longest on a British preserved line.

== Governance ==
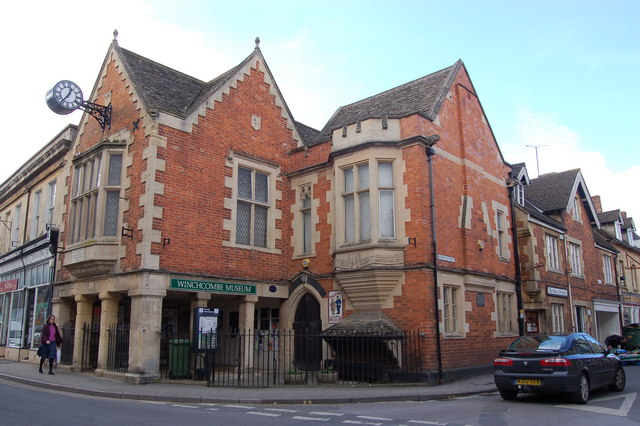
Winchcombe Town Hall

An electoral ward in the same name stretches from Alderton in the north to Hawling in the south. Its total population at the 2011 census was 6,295. Winchcombe Town Hall is now host to Winchcombe Folk and Police Museum.

== Schools ==
Winchcombe has a secondary school – Winchcombe School in Greet Road, east of the town centre. Winchcombe Abbey Church of England Primary School lies near the town centre in Back Lane, next to Winchcombe Library and Cowl Lane.

== Media ==
Local news and television programmes are provided by BBC West Midlands and ITV Central. Television signals are received from the Sutton Coldfield and local relay TV transmitters.

Local radio stations are BBC Radio Gloucestershire on 104.7 FM, Heart West on 102.4 FM, Greatest Hits Radio South West on 107.5 FM, and Radio Winchcombe, a community based radio station which broadcast to the town on 107.1 FM.

The town is served by the local newspaper: Gloucestershire Echo.

== Community ==
The community station Radio Winchcombe began broadcasting in April 2005 for 20 days a year. Full-time broadcasting was approved in December 2011 and began on 18 May 2012.

Winchcombe has a Michelin selected restaurant at 5 North Street. From 2004 to 2017, it held a one star rating. There are several other frequented eating places.

Winchcombe Town F.C. plays in the Gloucestershire Northern Senior League.

In 2023 a community funded project purchased the methodist church in the centre of Winchcombe to provide a community performing-arts centre, this operates under the name Isbourne Arts.

== Notable people ==
In birth order:

- King Coenwulf of Mercia, reigned 796–821, buried in Winchcombe Abbey
- Saint Kenelm (c. 786–811), a martyred boy-king of Mercia, was interred at Winchcombe, which became a major centre for his medieval cult.
- Robert Tideman of Winchcombe (died 1341) was consecrated Bishop of Llandaff in 1393 and translated to the see of Worcester in 1395.
- Ralph Boteler, 1st Baron Sudeley (c. 1394–1473), Lord High Treasurer of England and builder of Sudeley Castle and St. Peter's Church in Winchcombe.
- Giles Brydges, 3rd Baron Chandos (c. 1548–1594), an English courtier in the reign of Queen Elizabeth I, was born and was buried at Sudeley Castle in Winchcombe.
- Grey Brydges, 5th Baron Chandos (c. 1580–1621), remembered as "King of the Cotswolds" for his wealth
- Clement Barksdale (1609–1687), born in Winchcombe, became a religious author, polymath and Anglican priest.
- Christopher Merret (1614/1615–1695), born in Winchcombe, a naturalist, produced the first lists of British birds and butterflies.
- Richard Eedes (died 1686), a Presbyterian minister and religious author with royalist sympathies, died at Winchcombe.
- Emma Dent (1823–1900), antiquarian, collector and author of The Annals of Winchcombe and Sudeley, restored Sudeley Castle with her husband and built or improved many houses in the town, including the Dent Almshouses.
- George Backhouse Witts (1846–1912), a civil engineer and archaeologist who specialized in the barrows of Gloucestershire, was born in Winchcombe.
- Edward Griffiths (1862–1893) played cricket for Gloucestershire in 1885–1889.
- William Yiend (1865–1939), born in Winchcombe, was an international rugby union forward.
- John Alfred Valentine Butler (1899–1977), born in Winchcombe, was a physical chemist who contributed to electrode kinetics through the Butler–Volmer equation.
- Michael Cardew (1901–1983), master potter, moved to Winchcombe to revive a derelict pottery and 17th-century English slipware tradition.
- John Kingsley Cook (1911–1994), a prominent wood engraver, was born in Winchcombe.
- Sidney Tustin (1913 – 2005) worked at Winchcombe Pottery from 1926 until 1979
- Ray Finch (1914–2012), master potter, bought Michael Cardew's pottery in 1939, and after the Second World War worked there for the rest of his life making stoneware.
- Colin Pearson (1923–2007), master potter, worked at Winchcombe under Ray Finch until 1954.
- Seth Cardew (1934–2016), a master potter born in Winchcombe, was the son of Michael Cardew and brother of the composer Cornelius Cardew.
- Cornelius Cardew (1936–1981), composer, was born in Winchcombe, the son of Michael Cardew.

=== See also ===
- Winchcombeshire
