= Richard Fowler (cricketer) =

English cricketer

Cricket information
- Batting: Right-handed
- Bowling: Right-arm fast-medium

Career statistics
Competition	First-class
Matches	4
Runs scored	72
Batting average	12.00
100s/50s	0/0
Top score	35
Balls bowled	192
Wickets	7
Bowling average	15.00
5 wickets in innings	1
10 wickets in match	0
Best bowling	5/33
Catches/stumpings	3/–
- Source: Cricinfo, 8 November 2022

Richard Harold Fowler (5 March 1887 – 27 October 1970) was an English first-class cricketer who played in four matches for Worcestershire in 1921.

Fowler was a clergyman, and after taking career-best figures of 5–33 against Gloucestershire at Stourbridge was informed that he would have been no-balled had he not had that vocation.

He was born in Islington, London, and died aged 83 in Clent, Worcestershire.
