= Dick Fowler (footballer) =

Australian rules footballer

Personal information
- Full name: Richard Wyke Fowler
- Born: 13 February 1890; Kensington, London, England
- Died: 19 July 1937 (aged 47); Melbourne, Victoria
- Original team: Caulfield Grammar

Playing career^{1}
Years	Club	Games (Goals)
1908	Melbourne	1 (0)
- ^{1} Playing statistics correct to the end of 1908.

Richard Wyke Fowler (13 February 1890 – 19 July 1937) was an Australian rules footballer who played with Melbourne in the Victorian Football League (VFL).
