= Clent =

Village in Worcestershire, England

Coordinates: 52°24′44″N 2°06′25″W

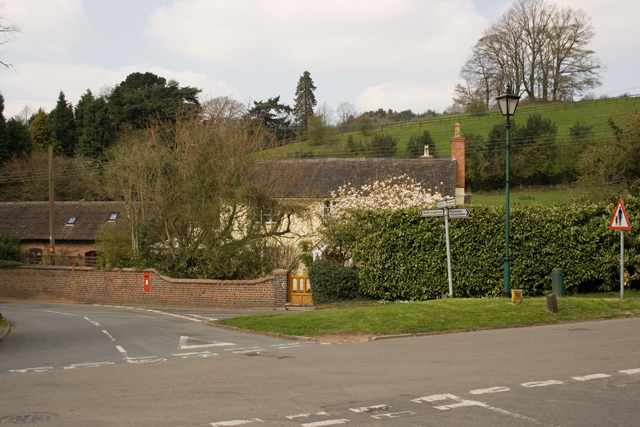
- The village green next to the parish church

- Location within Worcestershire
- Population: 2,600
  - London: 105 miles (170 kilometres)
- Civil parish: Clent
- District: Bromsgrove
- Shire county: Worcestershire
- Region: West Midlands
- Country: England
- Sovereign state: United Kingdom
- Post town: Stourbridge
- Postcode district: DY9
- Dialling code: 01562
- Police: West Mercia
- Fire: Hereford and Worcester
- Ambulance: West Midlands
- UK Parliament: Bromsgrove

Clent is a village and civil parish in the Bromsgrove District of Worcestershire, England, southwest of Birmingham and close to the edge of the West Midlands conurbation. At the 2001 census it had a population of 2,600.

The name Clent derives from the Old English clent, apparently meaning 'rock'.

== Parish history ==
The parishes of Clent and Broome were once an exclave of Staffordshire, completely surrounded by Worcestershire, having been seized by the Sheriff of Staffordshire before the Norman Conquest. This anomaly was addressed in 1844 when it was belatedly returned to Worcestershire. However, Clent has always remained part of the Worcester Diocese.

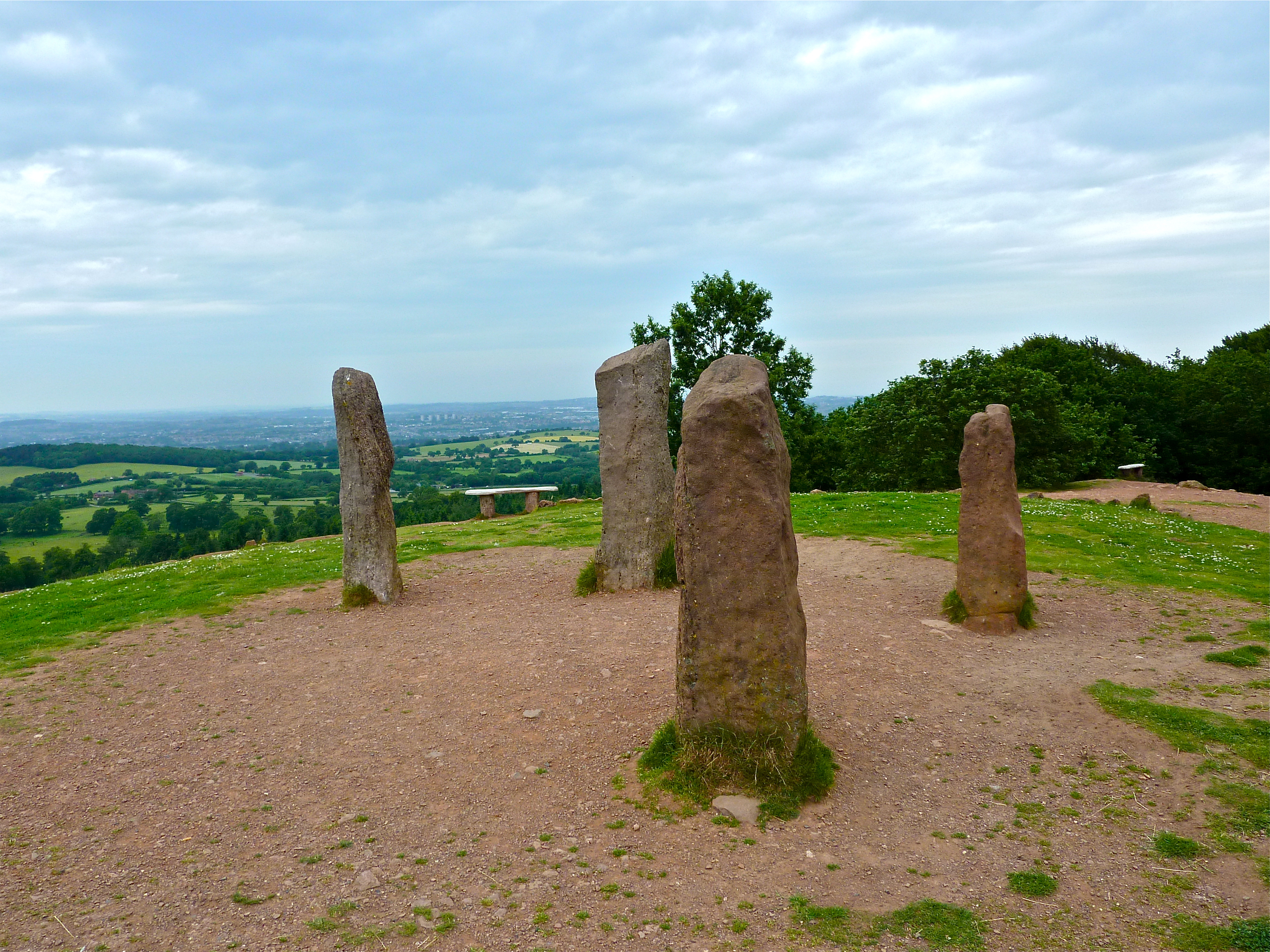
The four stones or "Ossian's Tomb" on the top of the Clent Hills were follies erected by George Lyttelton, 1st Baron Lyttelton

== Geography ==
Because of the hilly topography of the parish the village consists of several distinct hamlets. These are Upper Clent (Clatterbach and the area around the parish church of St. Leonard), Lower Clent, Holy Cross, Adams Hill and Walton Pool. The Civil Parish of Clent also included part of the village of West Hagley, the population of which is about half that of the whole parish. On the first of April 2016, this part of the parish was transferred to the Parish of Hagley. Though in the ancient ecclesiastical parish of Clent, that area is now part of the Anglican parish of Broome. Part of the parish is an area of agricultural lowland, but to the northwest the ground rises forming the Clent Hills (now owned by the National Trust), which is a popular destination for walkers.

=== Climate ===
Climate in this area has mild differences between highs and lows, and there is adequate rainfall year-round. The Köppen Climate Classification subtype for this climate is "Cfb". (Marine West Coast Climate/Oceanic climate).

Climate data for Clent
Month	Jan	Feb	Mar	Apr	May	Jun	Jul	Aug	Sep	Oct	Nov	Dec	Year
Mean daily maximum °C (°F)	7 (44)	8 (46)	10 (50)	13 (55)	16 (61)	19 (66)	22 (72)	22 (72)	18 (64)	14 (57)	10 (50)	7 (45)	14 (57)
Mean daily minimum °C (°F)	2 (36)	2 (36)	3 (37)	4 (39)	7 (45)	10 (50)	12 (54)	12 (54)	9 (48)	7 (45)	4 (39)	2 (36)	6 (43)
Average precipitation mm (inches)	43 (1.7)	38 (1.5)	25 (1)	30 (1.2)	28 (1.1)	36 (1.4)	33 (1.3)	28 (1.1)	38 (1.5)	48 (1.9)	41 (1.6)	41 (1.6)	430 (16.9)
Average precipitation days	22	19	20	20	18	17	18	18	18	21	21	21	114
Source: Weatherbase

== Education ==
Sunfield Children's Home is located in Clent, a charitable school for children with autism and complex learning needs. There is also a small primary school located in Holy Cross, called Clent Parochial Primary School, with just over 100 pupils ranging from Reception (age 4) to Year 6 (age 11), after which the pupils feed into Haybridge High School, the local secondary school, in the neighbouring village of Hagley.

== Notable residents ==
Notable residents of Clent include:

- John Amphlet, High Sheriff of Worcestershire in 1805
- Richard Fowler (5 March 1887 – 27 October 1970), cricketer
- James Higgs-Walker (31 July 1892 – 3 September 1979), cricketer
- Alan Todd (3 June 1900 – 14 August 1976), barrister and Conservative politician
