= Le Champignon Sauvage =

Coordinates: 51.891°N 2.080°W

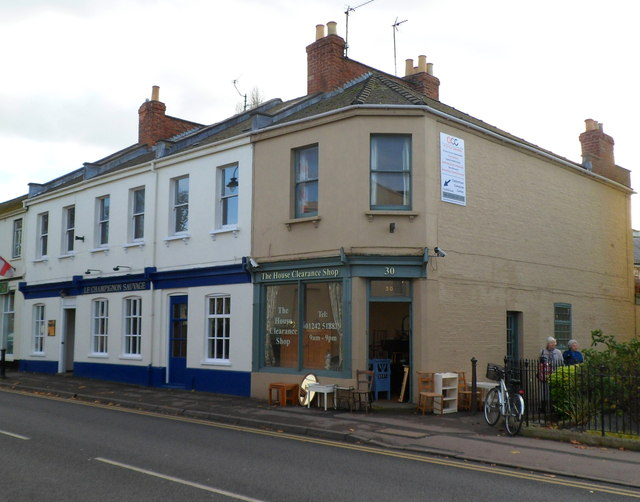
- Le Champignon Sauvage is the blue and white fronted building on the left of the image
- Interactive map of Le Champignon Sauvage

Restaurant information
- Owner(s): David and Helen Everitt-Matthias
- Rating: (Michelin Guide)
- Location: Cheltenham, Gloucestershire, England
- Seating capacity: 40

Le Champignon Sauvage is a restaurant located in Cheltenham, Gloucestershire, England. As of 2008, the restaurant holds two stars in the Michelin Guide. In 1987 the restaurant was opened by husband and wife, David and Helen Everitt-Mattias, initially for a period of three years, but the couple stayed with the restaurant due to high interest rates. To keep costs down, David, the head chef, incorporated cheaper cuts of meat and foraged ingredients on the menu. As of 1 October 2018, the restaurant has been downgraded to 1 Michelin star for the 2019 guide. It is one of only two Michelin Star restaurants in Gloucestershire.

== History ==
Le Champignon Sauvage has been run by husband and wife, David and Helen Everitt-Matthias, since 1987. They had met at the Four Seasons Hotel in London and had decided to take on the Cheltenham restaurant as part of a three-year project, but were forced to stay due to high interest rates. Originally just the two of them, with David cooking and Helen running the front of house, the restaurant now has a staff of four. David remains in control, has never missed a service and closes the restaurant when he is unable to be there, for example, to appear on Saturday Kitchen.

When the recession hit, David looked for ways to reduce costs and including the use of "humbler" ingredients which includes offal and cheaper cuts of meat as well as food foraged from the Cotswolds countryside. Eighteen years after opening, the restaurant has expanded into the building next door, holding 40 seats instead of the original 28 and the walls are now clad in wood panelling.

The restaurant holds one Michelin star, has won the Observer Food Monthly award for outstanding contribution, and was rated the 13th best restaurant in the country in the 2017 Good Food Guide.
