= Winchcombe Town Hall =

Municipal building in Winchcombe, Gloucestershire, England

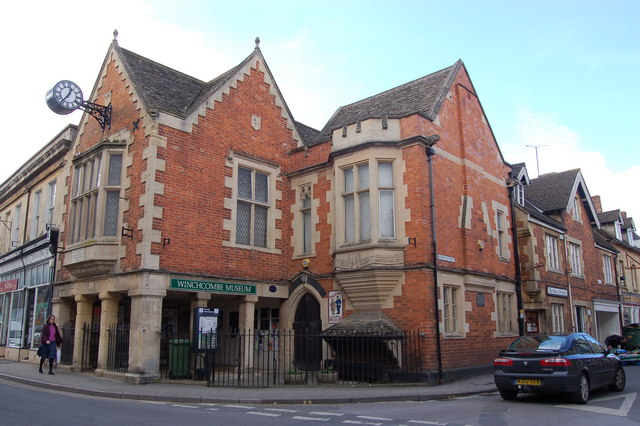
- Winchcombe Town Hall

- Shown in Gloucestershire
- 51.9536°N 1.9642°W
- Location: High Street, Winchcombe

History
- Built: 1853

Site notes
- Architect: William Hill Knight
- Architectural style: Tudor style

Listed Building – Grade II
- Official name: Town Hall
- Designated: 31 October 1984
- Reference no.: 1091507

Winchcombe Town Hall is a municipal building in the High Street, Winchcombe, Gloucestershire, England. The structure, which accommodates the Winchcombe Folk and Police Museum, is a Grade II listed building.

== History ==
The current building was commissioned to replace an earlier town hall which had become very dilapidated. The new building, formed by the southwest section of the current structure, was designed by William Hill Knight of Cheltenham in the Tudor style, built in red brick with stone dressings at a cost of £367 and was completed in 1853. The design involved a symmetrical main frontage of three bays facing onto the High Street. The building was arcaded on the ground floor, so that markets could be held, with three square-shaped piers supporting an entablature. The first floor was fenestrated by a prominent oriel window with a gable above. Internally, the principal room was an assembly room on the first floor.

The structure was extended with an extra block, recessed from the High Street and extending along North Street, which was completed in 1871. The design involved an asymmetrical main frontage of two bays facing onto the High Street. There was an arched doorway with brick voussoirs in the left hand bay, while the first floor was fenestrated by a cusped lancet window in the left hand bay and by a castellated oriel window in the right hand bay with a parapet above. A projecting clock, presented by wealthy stockbroker and art collector, Reginald Heber Prance of Hampstead, was installed in the gable in 1897.

Petty sessions were held in the town hall from an early stage. However, the borough council, which was administered by a court leet that met in the town hall, was abolished under the Municipal Corporations Act 1883. The assets of the corporation were transferred to a newly established entity, the Winchcombe Town Trust, in 1890. The building subsequently became a community events venue and local cinema.

The Winchcombe Museum, which had been established in the Parvis Room above the porch of St Peter's Church in Winchcombe in 1928, moved to the town hall in 1986. Items accessioned to the museum included artefacts associated with local history as well as police uniforms, police weapons and other police-related items. It subsequently developed as the Winchcombe Folk and Police Museum. An extensive programme of refurbishment works, costing £150,000 much of which was financed by the Heritage Lottery Fund, was completed in 1999.

Works of art in the town hall include five portraits by Josiah Rushton of various civic leaders.
