= Belbroughton =

Village in Worcestershire, England

Coordinates: 52.391°N 2.119°W

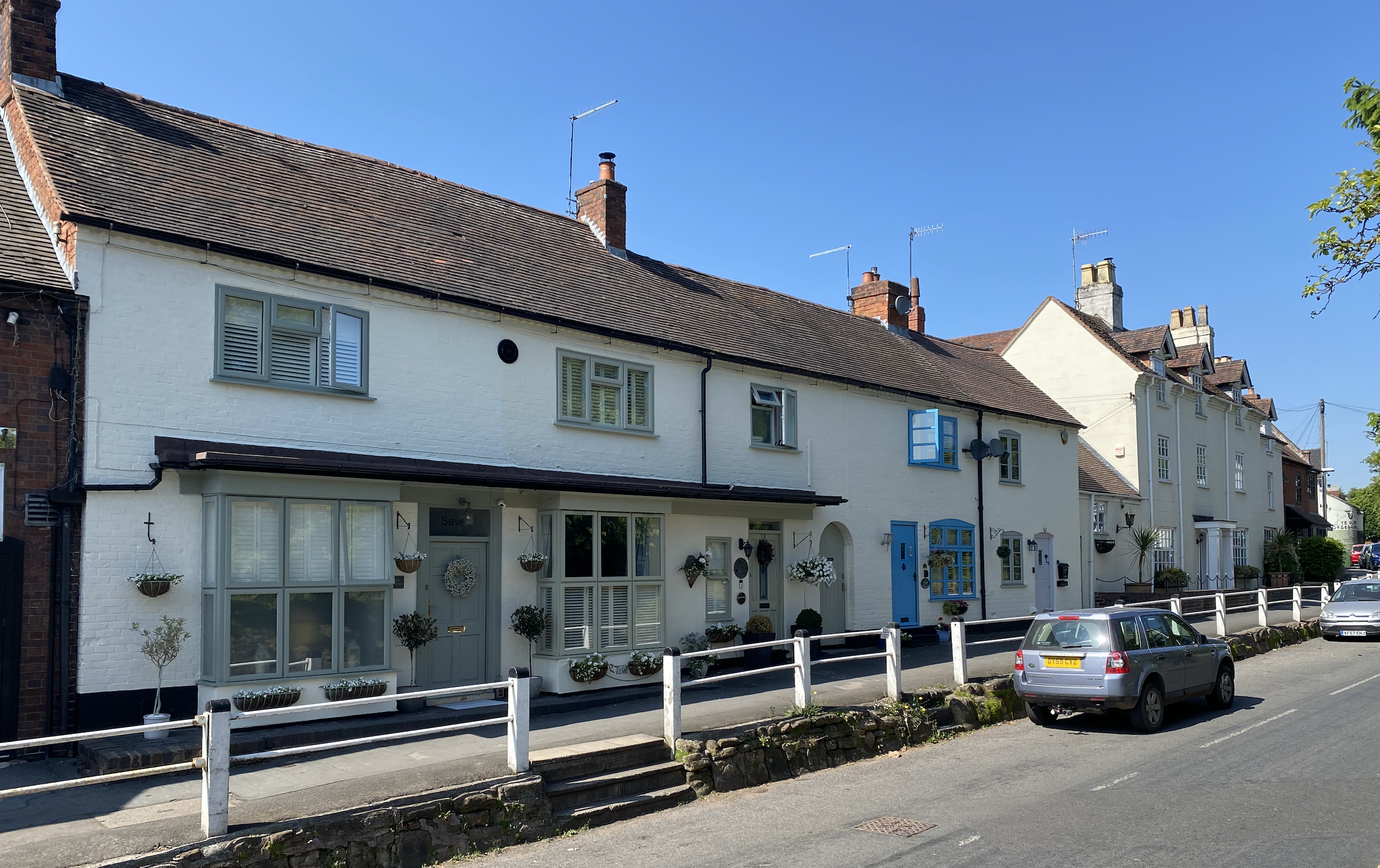
- High Street

- Location within Worcestershire
- Population: 2,685
- OS grid reference: SO919770
  - London: 106 miles (171 km)
- Civil parish: Belbroughton
- District: Bromsgrove
- Shire county: Worcestershire
- Region: West Midlands
- Country: England
- Sovereign state: United Kingdom
- Post town: STOURBRIDGE
- Postcode district: DY9
- Dialling code: 01562
- Police: West Mercia
- Fire: Hereford and Worcester
- Ambulance: West Midlands
- Website: Belbroughton and Fairfield Parish Council

Belbroughton (/bɛlˈbrɔːtən/ bel-BRAW-tən) is a village and civil parish in the Bromsgrove District of Worcestershire, England. According to the 2021 census it had a population of 2,685. It is about six miles north of Bromsgrove, six miles east of Kidderminster and four miles south of Stourbridge. Besides the village, the parish has scattered settlements including the hamlets of Bell End and Fairfield.

== History ==
=== Development ===
The earliest mention of the village was in AD817. In 1086, there was already a priest and a Saxon church, which stood on the same site as the present Holy Trinity church. The church was later rebuilt by the Normans and some remnants of this structure still remain. The church has been altered over the years with large scale restorations in the 1890s. The tower clock was erected in celebration of Diamond Jubilee of Queen Victoria, and the lychgate was built in 1912 and dedicated to Henry Charles Goodyear, who was a missionary from the parish.

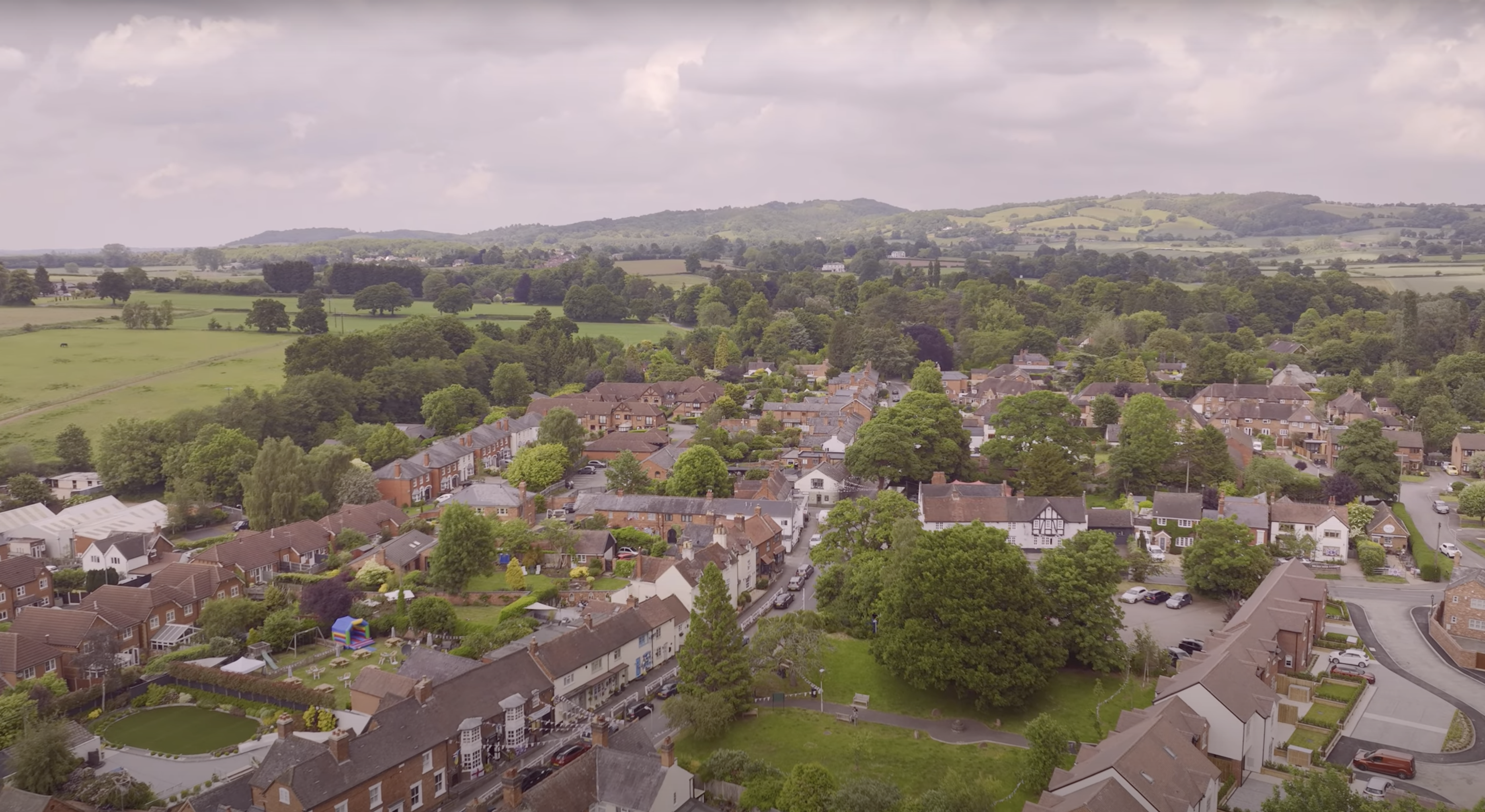
Aerial view of Belbroughton

The Church is a Domesday Book Church. The present Churchyard is believed to have been the site of early Pagan religious ceremonies, The base of the existing Woodgate memorial is believed to be a Pagan preaching stone. After conversion to Christianity, it is thought a wooden Church was erected, to be replaced in Norman times with a substantial stone structure. Little of this remains but there is a Norman Chapel in the grounds of Bell Hall. The present Church was built at the beginning of the 14th century. However, the Black Death of 1348-9 had a decimated its activity and claimed the lives of three Priests. The Church at that time was highly decorated and traces of the original colours can still be seen.

Belbroughton was at the core of the North Worcestershire scythe-making district. Many of the mills of the area were formerly blade mills used for sharpening them, after a scythesmith had forged them from iron, with a thin strip of steel along the cutting edge. From the late 18th century until about 1870, the Waldron family of Field House Clent were the leading manufacturers. They were succeeded by Isaac Nash, whose business finally closed in 1967. Scythes were formerly not just made in Belbroughton, but also several adjacent parishes, including Chaddesley Corbett.

In Belbroughton in 1831, with a population of 1,476, 68 weekly payments for poor relief were made. Poor relief however was only due to residents of a parish, provable through a certificate of residence.

At the crossroads in the nearby hamlet of Bell Heath, there is a boulder that was brought by glacial process from Arenig Fawr, a mountain within Snowdonia, in Gwynedd. A plaque reads "Boulder from Arenig Mountain in N. Wales, Brought here by the Welsh Ice-Sheet in the Glacial Period".

=== 2008 flooding ===
On 7 September 2008 heavy rain caused Belne Brook, which runs through the village, to swell. The rising water was held back by a seven-foot wall but the pressure of the water caused it to break. The surge of water tore through the village sweeping away cars and causing severe water damage (and in some cases structural damage) to many properties. The current was so strong, it made tarmac ripple.

== Politics ==
Belbroughton is in the constituency of Bromsgrove, which is a traditionally Conservative safe seat. The Conservative party have held the seat since its modern establishment at the 1983 General Election. Sajid Javid, former Chancellor of the Exchequer, served as the constituency's MP from 2010 to 2024. The current MP is Bradley Thomas, who also serves as the Parliamentary Private Secretary to the Shadow Secretary of State for Energy Security and Net Zero.

Belbroughton also composes the Belbroughton & Romsley ward of Bromsgrove District Council. In the latest election for the council, held in 2023, Karen May and Simon Nock of the Conservative party were elected as councillors. At county council level, the village also composes a part of the Clent Hills division. In the 2025 Worcestershire County Council election, Karen May of the Conservative party was elected.

== Facilities ==
Facilities include a village shop, which includes the post office, a deli/coffee shop, a hairdressers, and a recreational centre with tennis courts, children's playground and playing field. There is an active cricket club on the outskirts of the village. The area also has a number of public houses in Belbroughton itself and in neighbouring villages.

== Education ==
Belbroughton Primary School is in the village, after which students progress to Haybridge High School, in the nearby village of Hagley.

== Local events ==
=== Belbroughton Scarecrow Festival ===
Since 1996, Belbroughton has hosted Scarecrow Weekend in the last weekend of each September. The festival was founded by Steve Haywood (The Crowman) – a children's author and artist. Villagers create scarecrows and display them outside their homes. It has proved very popular over recent years with thousands of visitors, raising tens of thousands of pounds for local organisations and amenities.

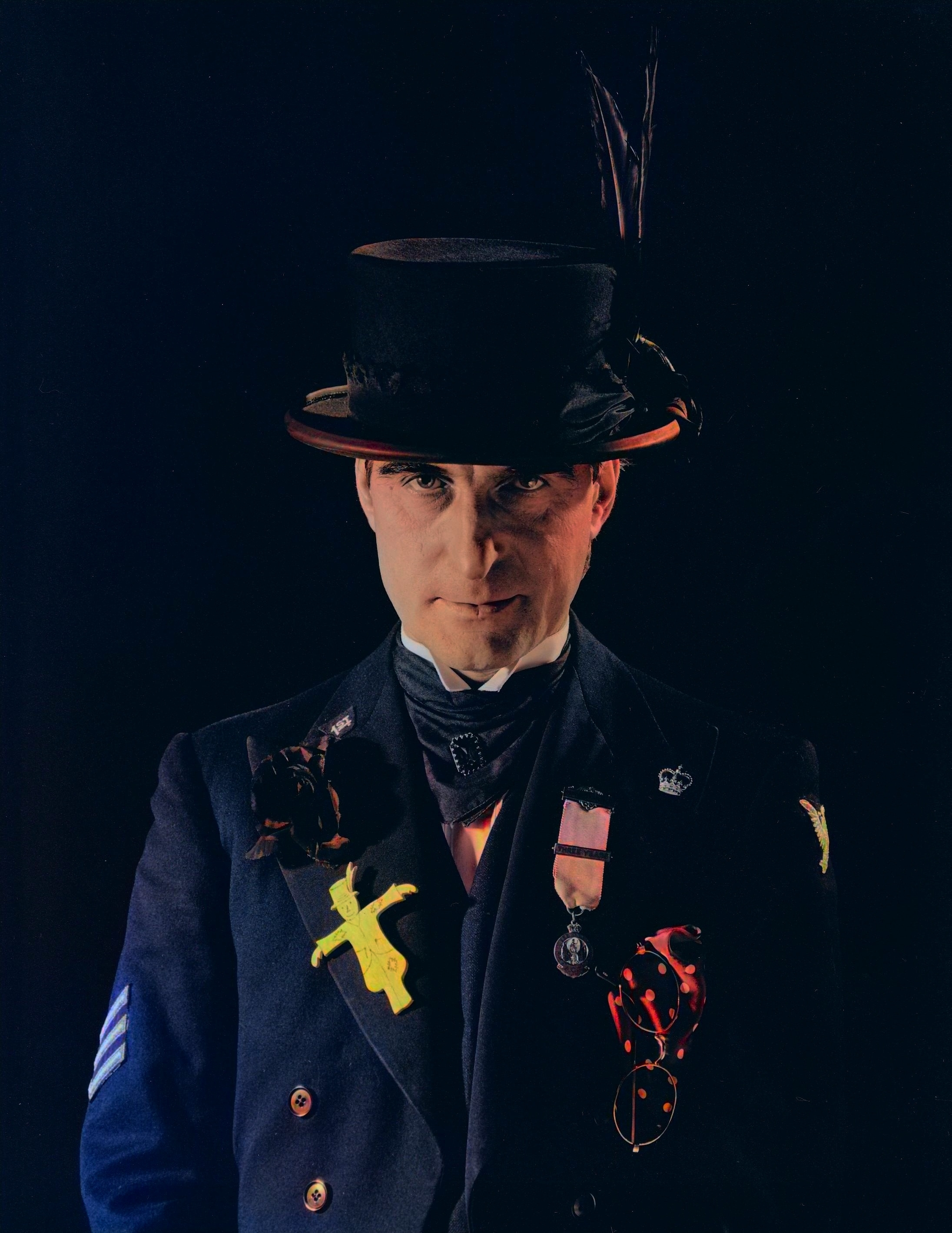

== Gallery ==
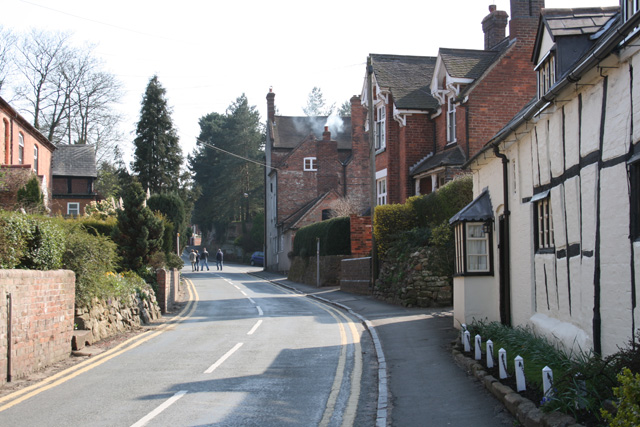
Church Road

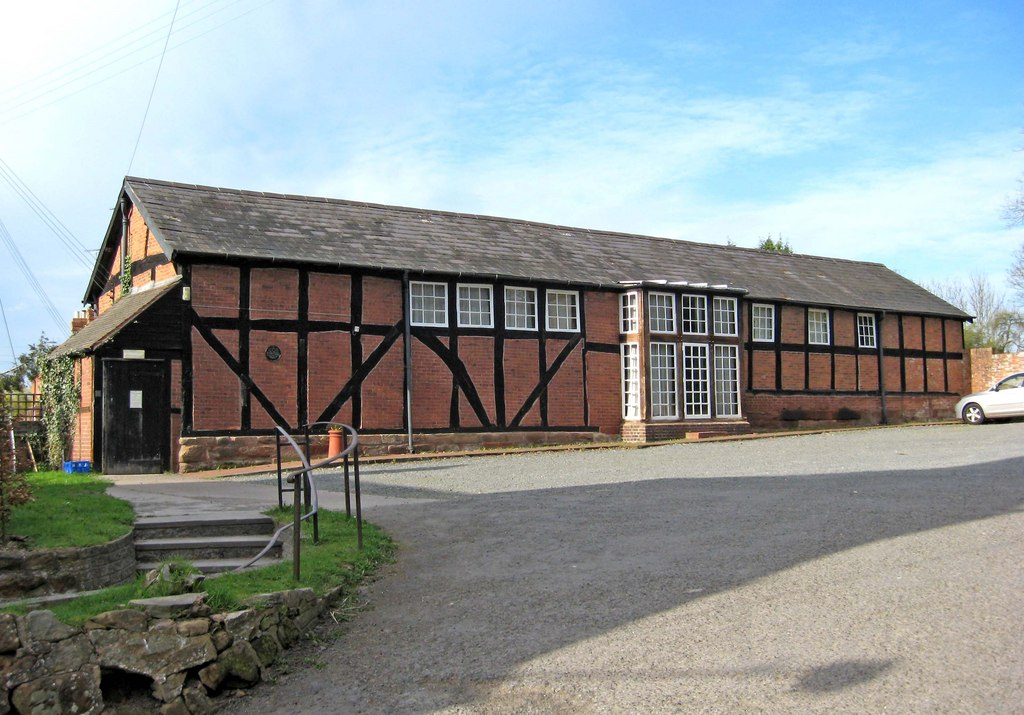
Church Hall

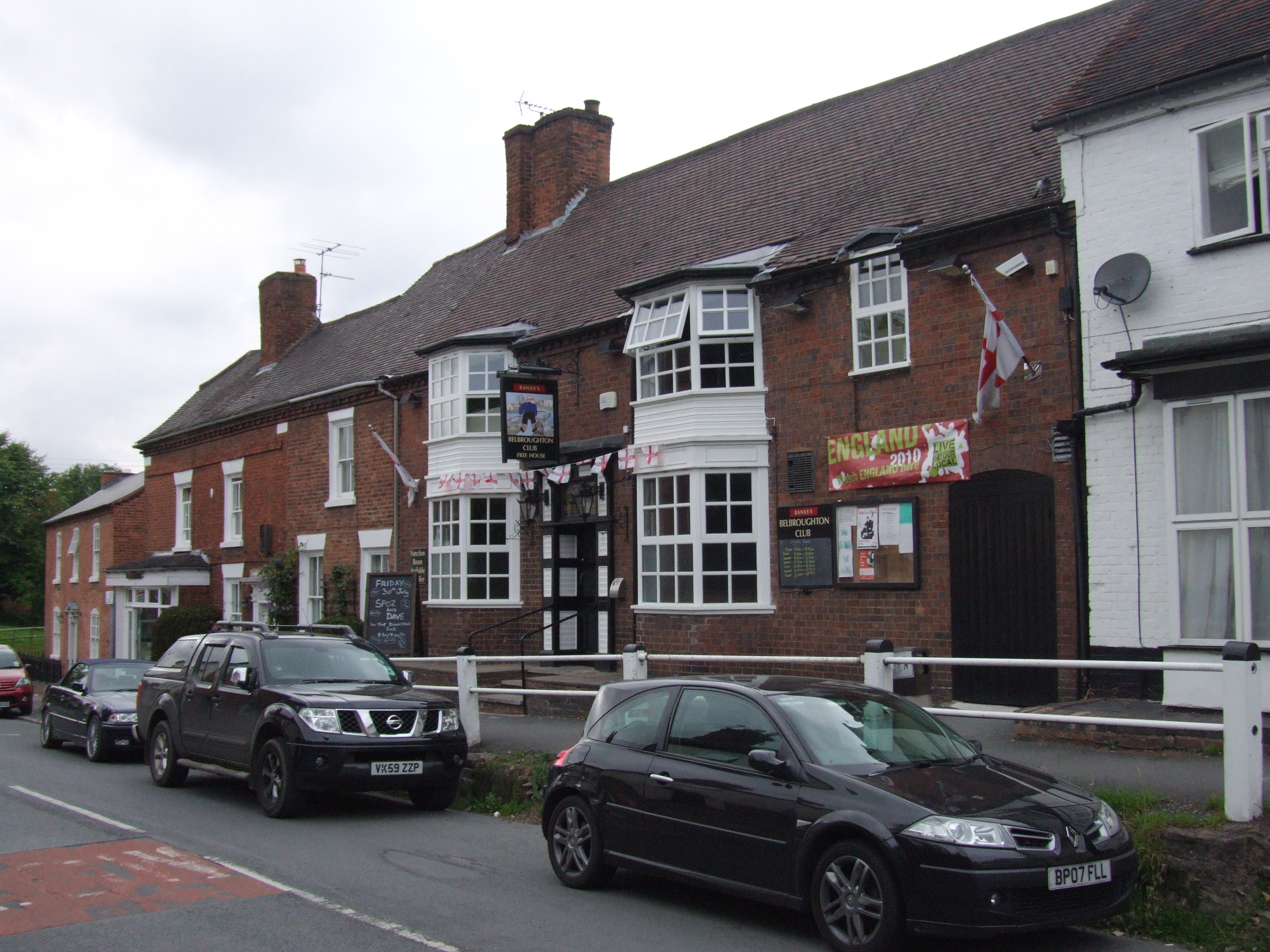
Belbroughton Workmen's Club and High Street in 2010

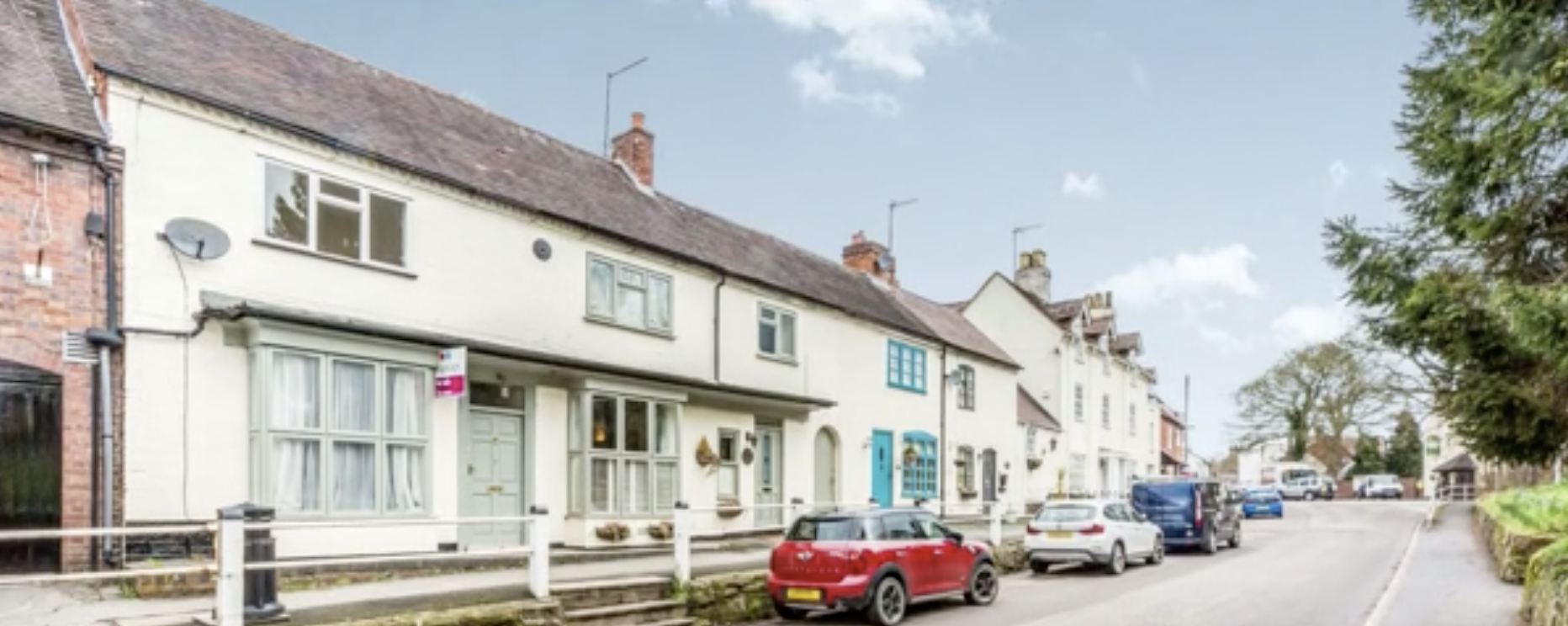
High Street in 2018

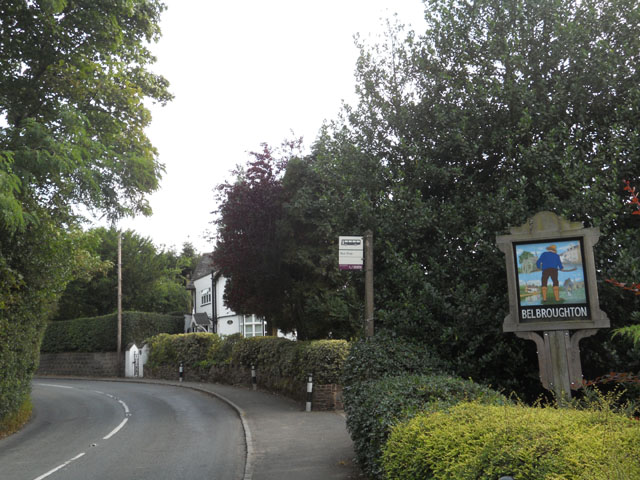
Holy Cross Lane

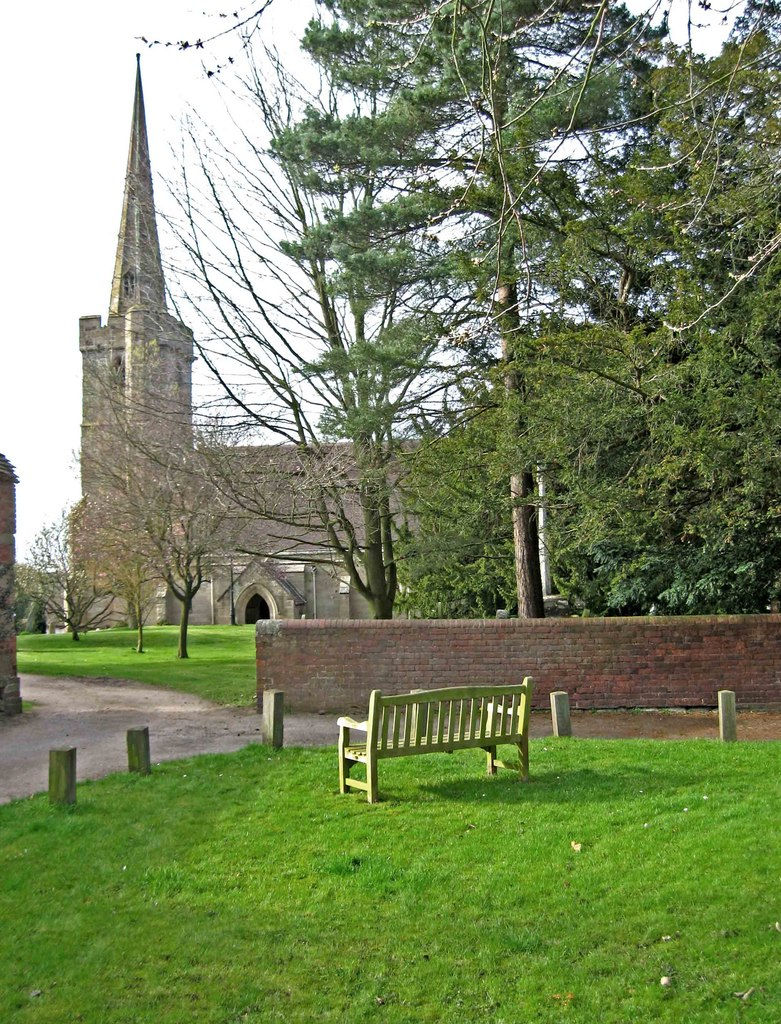
Belbroughton Church

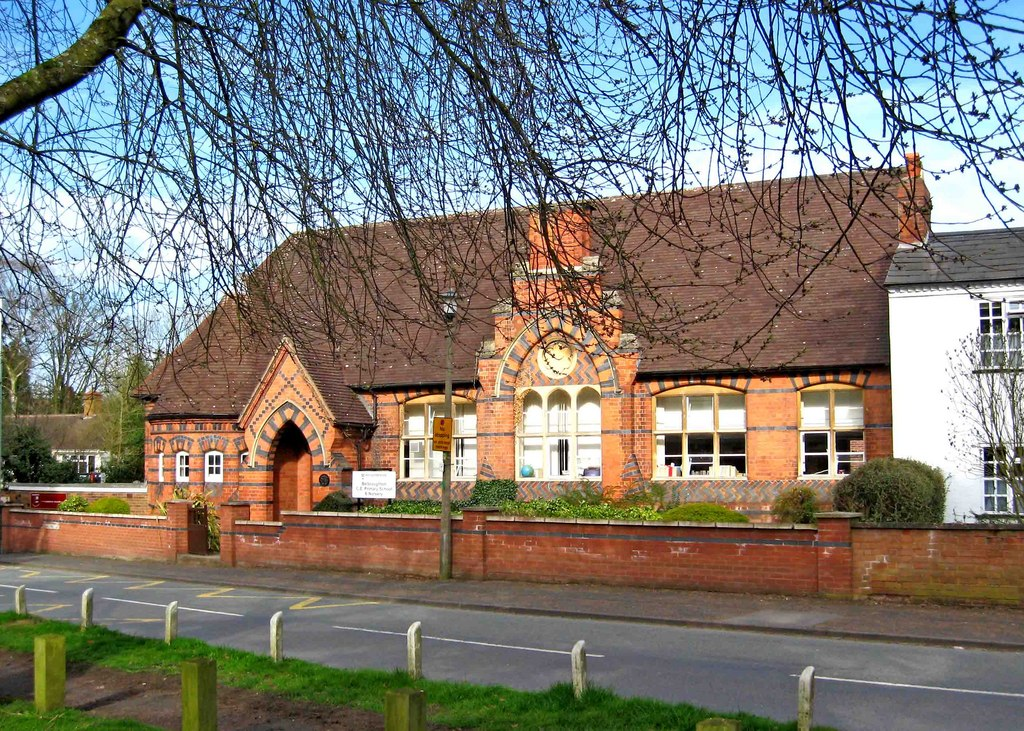
Belbroughton Church of England Primary School

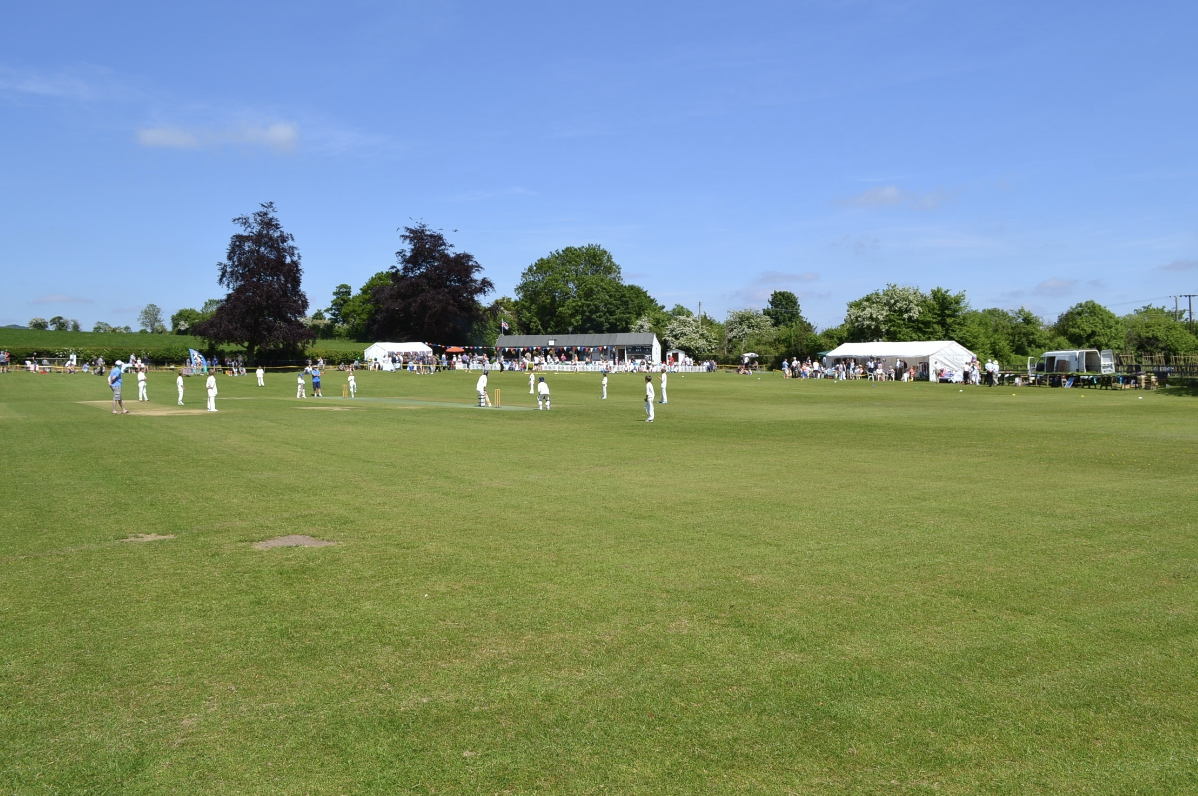
The village's cricket ground
