= Fairfield, Worcestershire =

Village in Worcestershire, England

Coordinates: 52.373°N 2.077°W

Fairfield
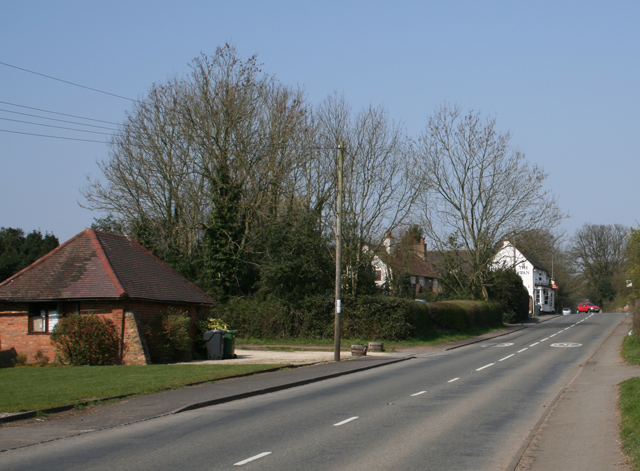
- Swan Inn

- Location within Worcestershire
- Civil parish: Belbroughton
- District: Bromsgrove
- Shire county: Worcestershire
- Region: West Midlands
- Country: England
- Sovereign state: United Kingdom
- Post town: BROMSGROVE
- Postcode district: B61
- Dialling code: 01527
- Police: West Mercia
- Fire: Hereford and Worcester
- Ambulance: West Midlands
- UK Parliament: Bromsgrove

Fairfield is a village in the district of Bromsgrove, Worcestershire, England. It is in the civil parish of Belbroughton.

The village of Fairfield and the hamlets of Stoneybridge & Wildmoor form the Fairfield Ward, part of Belbroughton and Fairfield Parish, which is in Bromsgrove District, Worcestershire.

The ancient Manor of Fairfield can be traced back to 817AD, when King Coenwulf in 817 exempted the Bishop of Worcester’s estate at ‘Beolne, Broctun and Forfeld’ from all secular services except military service and the maintenance of bridges and strongholds (British History Online). The Anglo-Saxon name of Forfeld meaning “open land where hoggs pasture” (Oxford Dictionary of Place Names).

According to the 2011 census the population of the ward was 942.

The village has a village hall, primary school, pub (The Swan) and a Church (St. Mark's, Church of England).

At the village's recreation ground there is a children's play areas, the millennium garden and the club house for Fairfield Villa Football Club.

To north of the village is Fairfield Court, the site of Anglo-Saxon Forest Court, to the west is Pepper Wood, a semi-ancient (SSSI) woodland, and to the north-west the newly created Fairfield Forest, both woodland sites managed by the Woodland Trust.

There is an active community association, Fairfield Village Community Association, whose volunteers manage the entrance planters and flower beds on the Recreation Ground, conduct monthly litter picks, produces a quarterly newsletter and organises community events. The Community Association, with the support of the Fairfield Village Hall, delivers a monthly market hall, Foodie Fairfield, with a range of stalls supporting local food producers, and Bromsgrove Arts, the home of Fairfield Flicks & Fairfield Music, since September 2019 screening movies and event cinema, and from October 2021 providing a platform for existing and emerging artists to with monthly live music nights.
