= Holt End, Worcestershire =

Village in Worcestershire, England

Coordinates: 52.323826°N 1.891537°W

Holt End
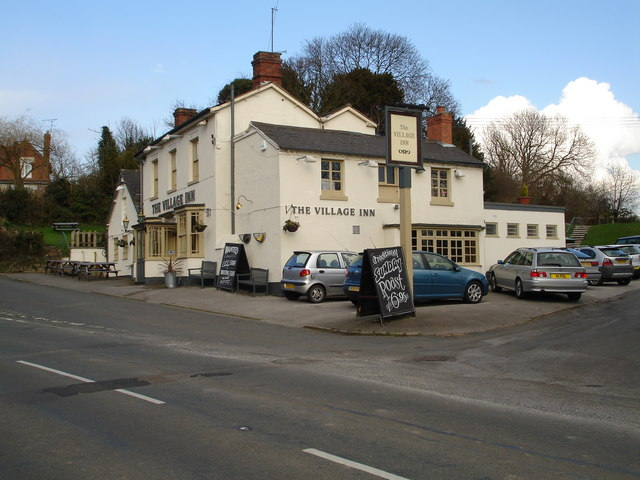
- The Village Inn

- Location within Worcestershire
- Civil parish: Beoley
- District: Bromsgrove
- Shire county: Worcestershire
- Region: West Midlands
- Country: England
- Sovereign state: United Kingdom
- Police: West Mercia
- Fire: Hereford and Worcester
- Ambulance: West Midlands

Holt End is a village in the civil parish of Beoley in Worcestershire, England. It is the main centre of population in the parish and is frequently referred to as Beoley. The village of Holt End has a pub and a primary school.

The conservation plan for Beoley says that the Holt End settlement dates to the sixteenth century, and that surviving buildings are mostly from the eighteenth and nineteenth centuries, with some timber-framed structures from the sixteenth and seventeenth centuries.
