= Bell End =

Village in Worcestershire, England

Coordinates: 52°23′34″N 2°05′25″W

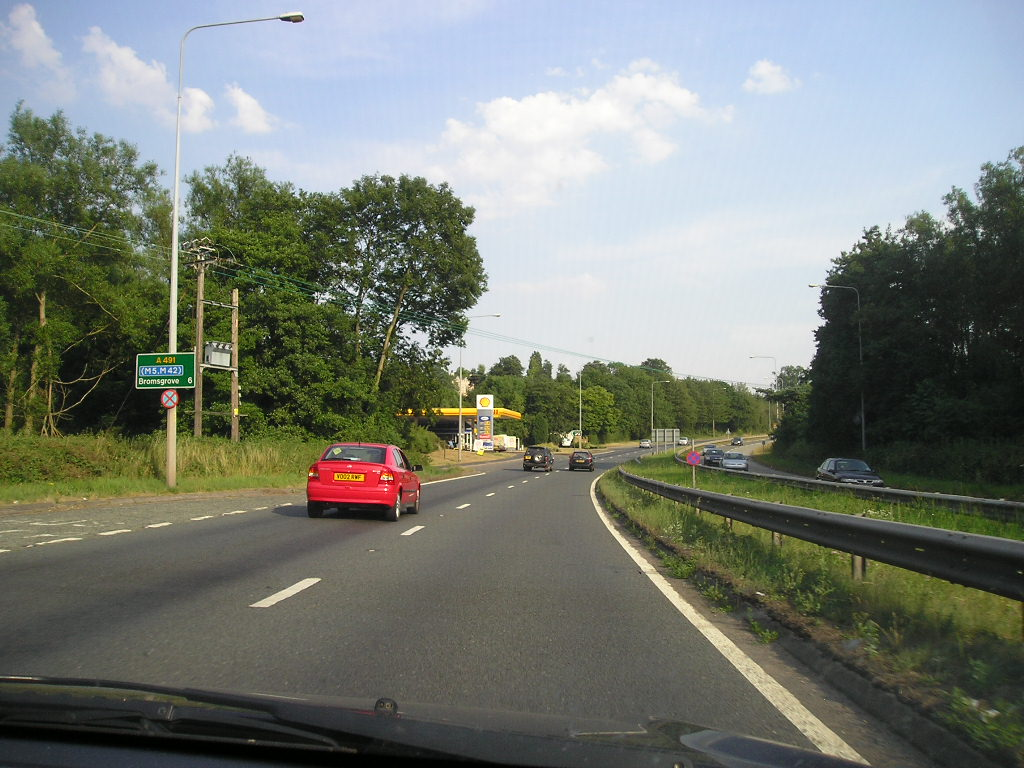
- The A491 passing through the village, the Bell End Service Station is on the left.

- Location within Worcestershire
- OS grid reference: SO938773
  - London: 105 miles (169 km)
- Civil parish: Belbroughton
- District: Bromsgrove
- Shire county: Worcestershire
- Region: West Midlands
- Country: England
- Sovereign state: United Kingdom
- Post town: STOURBRIDGE
- Postcode district: DY9
- Dialling code: 01527
- Police: West Mercia
- Fire: Hereford and Worcester
- Ambulance: West Midlands

Bell End is a village in the English county of Worcestershire. It is situated approximately 2 miles (3 km) south-east of Hagley on the A491, north of Bromsgrove and close to Kidderminster, Stourbridge and Halesowen. It lies in the local government District of Bromsgrove.

The village lies about 1.5 miles (2.4 km) east of Belbroughton.

On the western side of the village is Bell Hall, a Victorian Gothic mansion on the site of the original manor house. It was built in 1847 for Charles Noel, later a High Sheriff of Worcestershire, by the architect Edward Smith of Oldswinford. In 2010 the property was offered for sale at £3.5 million.

The village shares its name with the British slang for the glans penis.
