= Beoley =

Village in Bromsgrove District of Worcestershire

Coordinates: 52.324°N 1.906°W

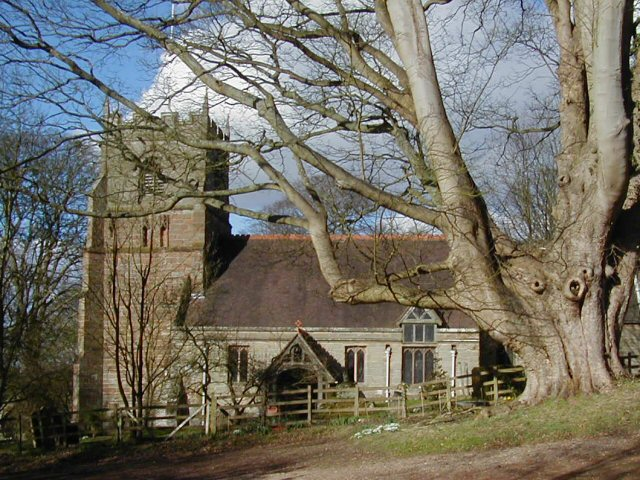
- St Leonard's parish church

- Location within Worcestershire
- Population: 984 (parish, including Holt End) (2021 census)
- OS grid reference: SP0669
  - London: 95 miles (153 km)
- Civil parish: Beoley
- District: Bromsgrove
- Shire county: Worcestershire
- Region: West Midlands
- Country: England
- Sovereign state: United Kingdom
- Post town: Redditch
- Postcode district: B98
- Dialling code: 01527
- Police: West Mercia
- Fire: Hereford and Worcester
- Ambulance: West Midlands
- UK Parliament: Bromsgrove

Beoley is a small village and larger civil parish north of Redditch in the Bromsgrove District of Worcestershire. It adjoins Warwickshire to the east. The 2021 census gave a parish population of 984, mostly at Holt End. The parish includes the hamlet of Portway, adjacent to the A435 road. It adjoins the Redditch suburb of Church Hill and the civil parishes of Alvechurch, Tanworth-in-Arden, Mappleborough Green and Wythall.

== History ==
=== Name ===
The name Beoley derives from the Old English bēolēah meaning 'bee wood/clearing'.

=== Manor ===
The estates of the Benedictine Pershore Abbey included lands at Beoleahe from the 10th century at the latest, when Edgar the Peaceful restored them to the monks in AD 972. The Domesday Book of 1086 records that the abbey held 21 hides of land at Beolege and Yardley. An ancient castle, of which very slight traces remain, belonged successively to the noble families of Mortimer, Beauchamp, and Holland. Roger Mortimer (died 1214), Lord of Wigmore first appears in the pipe roll for 1174–1175, when he owned land in Shropshire and Worcestershire, and his daughter Joan Mortimer (died 1225) married Walter de Beauchamp of Elmley, Worcestershire, according to the Annals of Worcester. In 1378 John Holland, First Duke of Exeter and Earl of Huntingdon was granted lands by his half-brother King Richard II which included Buley Castel, this part being forfeited on 14 April 1385, though other lands were restored to him elsewhere. The de Beauchamp family of Elmley Castle, ancestors of William de Beauchamp, 9th Earl of Warwick, were mesne lords of the manor from the 12th century until about 1265, when they acquired the overlordship (superiority) from the abbey. In the 13th century the toponym was variously rendered Boleye, Beleg or Buley. The superiority of Beoley descended with the de Beauchamps until the death of Henry de Beauchamp, 1st Duke of Warwick in 1446, when it passed to his daughter Elizabeth, wife of George Nevill, 1st Baron Latimer. It is said to have remained with the Latimers until John Nevill, 4th Baron Latimer sold it in 1549.

William Sheldon of Abberton, however, must have held a good part of the parish by feu, as he was established at Balford Hall in Beoley in the reign of Edward IV (1460–1483). In addition, he bought Benyt's Place in that parish in 1488. Sheldon supported the Yorkists at the battle of Bosworth in 1485, and as a result of the definitive Lancastrian victory there he was deprived of his property, but it was restored to him before he died in 1517. In his Inquisition Post Mortem, held at Pershore, it was said that Sheldon owned Balford Hall and seven other houses and 460 acres (186 ha) of land in Beoley, and more elsewhere in Worcestershire and Warwickshire. In his will he made bequests to the churches at Beoley and Abberton and to Pershore Abbey.

Sheldon was succeeded at Beoley by his brother Ralph (died 1546), who was married to Philippa, daughter of Baldwin Heath of Ford Hall, Wootton Wawen. Ralph's eldest son, William (c. 1500–1570) inherited Beoley and also possessed the manors of Weston, Warwickshire, Abberton (jointly with his brother Francis), and by then virtually the whole parish of Beoley: some 4000 acres (over 1600 ha). He was Receiver at the Court of Augmentations, Knight of the Shire for Worcestershire, and Sheriff of the same county. Around 1534, William Sheldon purchased 2,000 acres (809 ha) of land at Skilts, between Beoley and his mother's home Ford Hall – lands which had been a grange of Studley Priory. His magnificent tomb is in Beoley parish church.

William Sheldon was succeeded by his son, another Ralph Sheldon (1537–1613), married to Anne, daughter of Sir Robert Throgmorton of Coughton, who had attended the reception of Anne of Cleves. An upbringing which favoured Protestant principles rather than Roman Catholic, make it unlikely that Ralph was a courtier at the Court of Queen Mary, and re-reading of the documents make it clear that the courier for Mary Queen of Scots between her place of confinement in England and Scotland was not Sheldon but Mary's servitour, Skeldoun. On three later occasions, however,he is mentioned in the State Papers, under suspicion of favouring the Catholic Faith. The first was in August 1580 when he was imprisoned in London in the Marshalsea; he was released into the custody of the Dean of Westminster on medical grounds, later swearing allegiance to the Crown and undertaking to attend his parish church. For only three years was he listed as a recusant. In 1594 there is a reference to an alleged premeditated rebellion in North Wales, "the chiefest aid for which is to come from Ralph Sheldon," and to his sending an emissary to Louvain "with letters to Cardinal Allen". He was responsible for the construction of the large house at Weston, on the Sheldon estate in Long Compton parish, Warwickshire. He was succeeded by his eldest son and heir, Edward (1561–1643), more clearly a Royalist sympathizer. In August 1636, Charles I of England visited Warwick, and a day or two later went on "to Weston at Mr. Sheldon's house with great delight".

Edward's son and heir, William Sheldon of Beoley (1589–1659), always resided at Weston, where he died. In 1611, he married Elizabeth, daughter of the recusant William Petre, 2nd Baron Petre. Considered "a man of literary taste", Sheldon was a Royalist and at various times during the early years of the Civil War he was, in his turn, harassed as "a Popish delinquent".

After the Restoration of the Monarchy in 1660, Beoley was restored through Richard Sheldon to William's son, the antiquary Ralph Sheldon (1623-1684). He was married to Henrietta Maria, daughter of Thomas, 1st Viscount Savage, but had no issue. Beoley then passed to a first cousin once removed born into the Steeple Barton branch of the family, becoming Ralph Sheldon, Lord of Beoley and Weston (1653–1720); he married Mary Anne, daughter of John Elliot of Gatacre Park, Shropshire. His estates passed to his eldest son and heir, Edward (1679–1736) and then to the latter's eldest son William (1715–1780). His son in turn, Ralph Sheldon, inherited Beoley in 1780, but by 1788 it was said to be heavily mortgaged and he sold the manor to a Thomas Holmes. Holmes separated Beoley Hall (see below) and 300 acres (120 ha) of land from the rest of the manor and sold off both to separate buyers.

=== Beoley Hall ===
The Sheldons' main manor house at Beoley was originally Balford Hall. In September 1643 William Sheldon's manor house at Weston Park was ransacked and cattle and goods "to a great value" taken away by soldiers. The following December his manor house at Beoley was burnt to the ground and all his goods and cattle "plundered by the soldiers." In 1648 the Parliamentarian authorities sequestrated Beoley. It was restored to the Sheldons in 1660, who had the present Beoley Hall built after the Restoration, either late in the 17th or early in the 18th century. It is a neoclassical house with an H plan, originally entirely three-storeyed, built of brick and entirely stuccoed.

In 1791 the new proprietor Thomas Holmes had the east wing rebuilt to plans by John Sanders, with two storeys built to the same height as the original three and a portico with four Tuscan columns. On the south end of the east wing, a bow window was added to the ground floor in 1791; a matching window was subsequently added to the first floor above. The main staircase is lit by a round skylight.

In 1968 Beoley Hall was in poor condition, but since 1986 it has been a Grade II listed building, now divided into apartments.

=== Parish church ===
The oldest parts of the Church of England parish church of St Leonard date from the early part of the 12th century and include the chancel arch. The south arcade dates from the early or middle part of the 13th century and the north arcade from about 1300. The west tower is a Perpendicular Gothic addition from about 1400 and the north aisle was also rebuilt in the Perpendicular style.

The Sheldon Chapel on the north side was added for the recusant Ralph Sheldon in about 1580. Its stone altar is said to be a gift from Pope Gregory XIII. The church was restored in 1885 and the Sheldon Chapel in 1891.

The tower has a ring of eight bells. The oldest is the tenor bell, cast in 1601 by Hugh Watts of Leicester. The seventh bell was cast in 1611 by one of Leicester's Newcombe family of bellfounders. The fourth bell was cast in 1622 by Henry III Oldfield of Nottingham. Richard Sanders of Bromsgrove cast the third bell in 1708 and the fifth in 1709. John Rudhall of Gloucester cast the seventh bell in 1789, which completed a ring of six. In 1999 this was increased to eight by adding a treble and a second bell cast by Whitechapel Bell Foundry.

== Amenities ==
Beoley has a primary school and a village hall. Its two pubs are the Cross and Bowling Green at Branson's Cross and the Village Inn at Holt End.

== Notable people ==
In birth order:

- Edward Sheldon (1599–1687), translator of Catholic religious works from French
- Ralph Sheldon (1623–1694), Royalist and antiquary, nephew of Edward
- Mary Whateley (1738–1835), poet and playwright writing as Harriett Airy and Mary Darwall (her married name)
- Sarah Cooper (1848–1932), (née Gill), originator of Frank Cooper's Oxford marmalade
- Sarah Bishop (living), previously Sarah Falkland, current journalist and relief news presenter for BBC Midlands Today

== Sources ==
- Pevsner, Nikolaus (1968). Worcestershire. The Buildings of England. Harmondsworth: Penguin Books. pp. 80–81.
- Willis-Bund, J. W.; Page, W. H., eds. (1924). A History of the County of Worcester: Volume 4. Victoria County History. London. pp. 12–19.
