= Edward Sheldon (translator) =

English translator

Edward Sheldon (born at Beoley, Worcestershire, 23 April 1599; died in London, 27 March 1687) was an English translator of four Catholic works. Two of them appeared in the troublesome period of the Stuart Restoration.

== Life ==
Sheldon was the third son of Edward Sheldon of Weston-on-Avon, Warwickshire and Elizabeth Markham his wife, daughter of Thomas Markham of Ollerton, Nottinghamshire. The antiquary Ralph Sheldon was his nephew. He was a gentleman-commoner at Gloucester Hall, Oxford and then pursued a legal education at Gray's Inn, London, before completing his studies at University College, Oxford. After that he took a foreign tour that lasted for some years.

Sheldon married Mary (or Margaret) Wake, daughter of Lionel Wake of Pedington, Northamptonshire, and Antwerp, by whom he had nine sons and four daughters. Most of them became active as Catholics and/or Royalists. Two daughters, Frances and Katharine, were maids of honour to Charles II of England's spouse Catherine of Braganza, to whom Sheldon dedicated his Counsels of Wisdom – "being desirous in these distracted times to offer something that is serious, and may invite People and direct them to the way of Virtue." One of the copies in the Bodleian Library had been given to the antiquary Anthony Wood by Frances Sheldon.

Having led a quiet life on his estate at Stratton, Gloucestershire, Sheldon began to be molested for his Catholicism and moved to London in 1641. Sheldon or a namesake was among those who surrendered Worcester to Parliament in July 1646. Other accounts say he remained in retirement. He was resident at a house on the east side of St James's Street, Westminster, from 1682 until his death on 27 March 1687.

== Works ==
Sheldon's translations of four religious works from the French demonstrate his commitment to Catholicism:

- The Holy Life of M. De Renty (1658)
- The Rule of Catholic Faith, by François Véron (1660)
- The Counsels of Wisdom, by Nicholas Fouquet, Marquis of Belle Isle (1680)
- Christian Thoughts for Every Day of the Month (1680)

The translation of Véron's work in 1660 has been described as both "hazardous and difficult", in view of the Restoration taking place at that time. That may explain why the place of publication is given falsely as Paris, instead of London.
