= Isaac Wake =

English diplomat and political commentator

Sir Isaac Wake (1580/81 – 1632) was an English diplomat and political commentator. He served as ambassador to Savoy for sixteen years, and later as ambassador to France. His brother Lionel Wake was a merchant in Antwerp.

== Early life ==
Isaac Wake was the second son of Arthur, son of John Wake of Hartwell, Northamptonshire, a descendant of the lords of Blisworth. His father, a canon of Christ Church and master of St. John's Hospital in Northampton, was rector of Great Billing in Northamptonshire until 1573, when he was deprived for nonconformity; he afterwards lived for many years in Jersey. Born in 1580 or 1581, Isaac Wake entered Christ Church, Oxford in 1593, and graduated B.A. in 1597; he was elected fellow of Merton College, Oxford in 1598, and graduated M.A. in 1603. In 1604 he became a student at the Middle Temple, and on 14 December 1604 was elected public orator of Oxford University. He took part in the reception of King James in 1605, delivering an oration "at the Hall-stair's foot in Christ Church." The king seems to have thought his oratory polished, if soporific. In 1607, he delivered a funeral oration on John Rainolds.

== Diplomatic career ==
In 1609, Wake travelled in France and Italy, and soon afterwards became secretary to Sir Dudley Carleton at Venice. In March 1612, his leave of absence from Merton College was extended for three years; but in the following November he came to England for a few months, during which he pronounced a funeral oration on Sir Thomas Bodley. He returned to Venice in March 1613, and stayed there, and afterwards at Turin, as Carleton's secretary until the latter left for England in July 1615. Wake then became British representative at the court of Savoy, and retained that office for nearly sixteen years. In 1617 he went to Bern, at the request of Charles Emmanuel I, Duke of Savoy, to mediate an alliance between Savoy and the Swiss states. At the end of 1618 he came to London, being "much courted" by the French ministers on his way through Paris, and was knighted on 9 April 1619 at Royston, Hertfordshire, where the king lay ill in bed. Immediately afterwards he was sent back to Turin with an offer of support to the duke in his candidature for the imperial crown, and at the same time with an informal mission to Frederick V, Elector Palatine, whom he saw at Heidelberg on his way out. On the death of Sir Henry Savile, in February 1622, Prince Charles tried to secure Wake's election as warden of Merton; but he was beaten by (Sir) Nathaniel Brent, the influence of the Abbots, combined perhaps with Wake's constant absence from England, proving too strong.

Wake was in England again in December 1623, when he married Anna, daughter of Edmund Bray of Barrington, and stepdaughter to Sir Edward Conway, the secretary of state. He was returned M.P. for Oxford University in January 1624, and attended parliament closely until his departure in May as ambassador to Savoy and Venice, with special instructions to endeavour to gain the assistance of those states for the recovery of the palatinate. Towards the end of 1626 he was employed on a mission to Bern and Zurich on behalf of the Grisons; and in 1627 he endeavoured to mediate, at the king of Denmark's request, between that monarch and the Duke of Savoy. After narrowly escaping the plague which ravaged Piedmont in 1630, he was appointed ambassador to the French court, and had audience of Louis XIII in May 1631.

Isaac Wake was spoken of as likely to succeed Viscount Dorchester as secretary of state when the latter died in February 1632; but before the appointment was made he died himself, from an attack of fever, at Paris in June 1632. His body was brought to England with the ceremony due to his rank, and buried in the chapel of Dover Castle. His widow petitioned the king for a pension, and for the payment of about £1,400 due to her husband at the time of his death, representing herself as destitute. The arrears at any rate seem to have been paid ultimately, for in 1633 Lady Wake bought an annuity from her half-brother, Lord Conway, for £1,450. She is mentioned in company with her kinswoman Lady Vere in the Diary of Samuel Rogers.

John Aubrey calls him "a very witty man", and describes a trick he played upon a preacher who was given to eavesdropping. An example of his armorial bearings shows Two bars in chief three torteaux, in a book-binding held at Toronto. The crest is a knot "commonly called Wake's Knot".

== Lionel Wake ==
Isaac Wake had a cousin, Lionel (or Leonard) Wake, who was an English merchant in Antwerp. He also maintained correspondence with Sir Dudley Carleton in 1617-18 and 1624. He was a close friend of the diplomat William Trumbull the elder (died 1635).

Lionel Wake converted to Catholicism in Antwerp and lived there for much of his life. He was involved the painting trade, exporting works by Rubens and his circle into England. A letter to Trumbull from April 1618 mentions pictures for the Earl of Arundel, one large and fragile requiring a special case for transport. Wake was also involved in the dispatch of a suite of six pieces of old tapestry and a satin canopy for the Countess of Pembroke.

He was the father of four sons and six daughters, of whom the eldest, Anna Wake (1605-before 1669) married the Antwerp merchant and art-collector Peeter Stevens. The portraits of Peeter Stevens (1627) and Anna Wake (1628), by Anthony van Dyck, are in the Mauritshuis in The Hague, Netherlands. The second daughter was the wife of the Catholic translator Edward Sheldon. The fourth, Margaret (born 1617), is said to have entered the English Carmelite convent in Antwerp in 1633 and made her professions to Anne Worsley in 1634, becoming Mother Mary Margaret of the Angels.

== Works ==
Wake's published works are:

- Rex Platonicus, 1607. A description, in Latin, of the king's entertainment at Oxford in 1605. It is referred to by Farmer and later annotators of Shakespeare, because of a performance described in it which perhaps suggested the subject of Macbeth.
- Oratio Funebris on John Rainolds, delivered on 25 May 1607.
- Oratio Funebris on Sir Thomas Bodley, 1613.
- A Threefold Help to Political Observations, contained in three Discourses, 1655. The discourses are:
  - Of the Thirteen Cantons of the Helvetical League (written about 1625)
  - Of the State of Italie (written in or soon after 1625)
  - Upon the Proceedings of the King of Sweden(written 1631)

An epitaph on James I, in English verse, was attributed to him.

- Divine Meditations. Written by an Honourable Person [i.e. Sir Isaac Wake.] Whereto is adjoyned, a Determination of the question, whether men ought to kneele at the receipt of the Holy Communion. And an essay of Friendship (T. Badger for Humphrey Mosley, London 1641).

Wake's despatches are among the foreign state papers at the Public Record Office. His letter-books from 1615 to 1630 are in the British Library, and so are a few of his letters to Buckingham, Carlisle, and others. Some of his despatches are printed in Cabala, and others in Gardiner's Letters and Documents.

== Other sources ==
- J. Stoye, English Travellers Abroad, 1604-1667: Their Influence in English Society and Politics (Yale University Press 1989), pp. 92-113 (Google)
- S. Bracken & R. Hill, 'Sir Isaac Wake, Venice and art collecting in early Stuart England: a new document', Journal of the History of Collections Vol. 24, Issue 2 (1 July 2012), pp. 183–198. Full text at Oxford Academic (Restricted - login)
- V. Larminie, 'Sir Isaac Wake and the case for war', History of Parliament Online, 20.vi.2013.
- V. Larminie, 'The Jacobean Diplomatic Fraternity and the Protestant Cause: Sir Isaac Wake and the View from Savoy,' The English Historical Review Vol. 121, No. 494 (December 2006), pp. 1300-1326. At Jstor (Subscription Login)
