= François Véron =

French Jesuit controversialist

François Véron (1575, Paris – 6 December 1649, Charenton) was a French Jesuit priest and controversialist.

== Life ==
After studying under the Society of Jesuits, he joined them, and taught in several colleges. To devote himself more freely to preaching and controversy against Protestants, he later left the society.

He challenged every minister he encountered, even the most learned and famous, such as Moulin, David Blondel, Daillé, or Bochard. His debates with them, and many other occasional or controversial writings, he afterwards published.

Having secured from Louis XIII letters patent authorizing him to deliver his sermons in public and to conduct conferences with the ministers or any other Protestants wheresoever he pleased, he went to Paris, to Charenton, where he was curé for 10 years (1638–48), because Calvinism had there its chief stronghold. He travelled to Saintonge, Béarn, Brie, Champagne, Lorraine, and Normandy. He preached before large audiences; ministers such as Boule, after having heard him, abjured Calvinism after 30 years in the ministry. "He has vanquished more ministers", wrote publicly the congregation of the Propagation of the Faith, "than another could have seen, alone he has converted more heretics to the Catholic faith than a thousand others."

Véron became the most celebrated controversialist in France; the general assembly of the clergy assigned him a pension of 600 livres yearly and accepted the dedication of some of his books of which it defrayed the expenses; the Estates of Languedoc undertook his support while he preached in their province; Pope Gregory XV sent his encouragement. He was invited to give lessons in controversy at the Collège de France and to teach his method at Saint-Lazare under Vincent de Paul, and at St. Sulpice under Olier.

== Controversial style ==
His method Véron set forth in a theoretical treatise and illustrated by his other works. Since the Protestants reject tradition and admit only Holy Scripture as the source and ground of faith, they must be required to show all their dogmata in the Bible, and all the articles of their Confession of Faith, which they cannot support with formal and explicit texts from the Sacred Books should be considered as untenable. On the other hand, it is of great importance to set forth the doctrine of the Church in all its purity; thus explained, it is entitled to the respect and the acceptance of heretics; hence it is important to separate authentic points of doctrine from what the heretics confuse with it, for example all the opinions of the schools, historical errors, popular legends, or private practices.

By this matter of simplifying Catholic dogma and of showing consideration to Protestants, Véron sometimes aroused the protests of certain Catholics; his treatise on the primacy of the church wherein he refutes Blondel's work of the same name was even placed on the Index at Rome (January, 1643). He was also accused of sometimes using blustering language and excessive harshness against his adversaries, who used the same towards him.

== Works ==
Véron attacked the Jansenists, writing three books against them during the last years of his life.

Apart from his anti-Jansenistic works and some partial translations of the Bible all of Véron's writings have to do with controversy. They are about 80 in number. Several of them are only a few pages in length; some are successive redactions of the same work under different names. Three summarize nearly all the others:

- "La méthode nouvelle, facile et solide de convaincre de nullité la religion prétendue réformée", published in 1615, re-edited in 1617, 1618, 1619, 1623, in several cities of France, translated into English, Dutch, and German, read and praised by Leibnitz, reprinted by Migne in his "Theologiae cursus completus" (Paris, 1860);
- "L'épitomé de toutes les controverses de religion en ce siècle" (1 vol., Paris, 1638; re-edited in 2 and 3 vols., translated into Latin, and abridged);
- "Règle de la foi catholique" (Paris, 1649), approved by the general assembly of the French clergy, by the faculty of theology of Paris, translated into Latin, and into English by Edward Sheldon, read and praised by Leibniz, reprinted several times abroad and three times in France in the nineteenth century.
