= Ralph Sheldon =

English royalist and antiquary (1623–1684)

Ralph Sheldon (1623–1684) was an English Roman Catholic Royalist and an antiquary. In his will he bequeathed his library and manuscripts to the College of Arms, his country's authority over heraldry and pedigree.

== Family ==
Sheldon was born on 1 August 1623 at Beoley, Worcestershire, the eldest son of the landowner William Sheldon (1589–1659) of Beoley and of Weston in Long Compton, Warwickshire, and his wife Elizabeth (1592–1656), daughter of William, Lord Petre. He was a nephew of Edward Sheldon, a translator of Catholic religious works.

The family was among the wealthiest gentry in the region, but their Catholicism precluded them from prominence in public life.

== Commonwealth period ==
Ralph Sheldon left England for France and Italy in 1642 and returned just before his marriage in 1647 to Lady Henrietta Maria, daughter of John Savage, 2nd Earl Rivers (c. 1603–1654), a wealthy Catholic politician and Royalist from Cheshire. Beoley Hall was burnt down in the English Civil War, apparently to stop it falling into Roundhead hands. The estate was sequestrated.

After the Restoration of 1660, Sheldon was nominated for a contemplated Order of the Royal Oak, to mark his family's devotion to Royalism.

== Scholarly activities ==
Sheldon's wife died childless in 1663, perhaps of the plague, after which he devoted himself wholly to genealogy, heraldry and antiquities and drew up a Catalogue of the Nobility of England since the Norman Conquest. He created a library at Weston that was catalogued by his fellow antiquary Anthony Wood. He also kept a cabinet of curiosities. Sheldon again travelled to Rome in 1667, to spend three years there expanding his collection. He was described by Wood as "a munificent favourer of learning and learned men".

Sheldon granted a stipend to the antiquary John Vincent and bought from him a major collection of manuscripts which had belonged to his father, Augustine Vincent, the Windsor Herald (c. 1584–1626). This and many of his own possessions he bequeathed to the College of Arms.

His library was sold in 1781.

== Tapestry maps ==
After the Restoration, Sheldon ordered copies to be woven of two of the tapestry maps, those of Worcestershire and Oxfordshire, first commissioned around 1590 by his great-grandfather, also named Ralph Sheldon (1537–1613). Each of the four originals centred on a county in which members of the family lived, held land and had friends: Gloucestershire, Worcestershire, Warwickshire and Oxfordshire. The copies of each map itself were almost exact, while the decorative borders were updated in style.

The two later maps and the earlier one of Warwickshire were sold at auction with the contents of Weston in 1781, to Horace Walpole. They were presented to Lord Harcourt, who built a room for them at Nuneham Courtenay. They later passed to the Yorkshire Philosophical Society. The Oxfordshire map is now displayed at the Ashmolean Museum, Oxford and that of Warwickshire is in the Market Hall Museum, Warwick. That of Worcestershire is in store in the Victoria and Albert Museum, London.

== Death ==
Sheldon died at Weston on 24 June 1684 and was buried, as his wife had been, in the family chapel at Beoley.
