= 2023 Bromsgrove District Council election =

2023 English local election

- 4 May 2023

All 31 seats to Bromsgrove District Council 16 seats needed for a majority

	First party	Second party	Third party
Leader	Karen May	Peter McDonald	Charlie Hotham
Party	Conservative	Labour	Independent
Last election	17 seats, 54.8%	5 seats, 21.9%	5 seats, 16.9%
Seats before	18	3	6
Seats won	11	8	7
Seat change	▼6	▲3	▲2
Popular vote	10,061	5,946	4,967
Percentage	37.2%	22.6%	18.3%
Swing	▼7.0%	▲0.7%	▲1.4%
	Fourth party	Fifth party
Leader	Rob Hunter
Party	Liberal Democrats	Residents
Last election	3 seats, 10.3%	1 seat, 5.0%
Seats before	3	1
Seats won	5	0
Seat change	▲2	▼1
Popular vote	5,198	N/A
Percentage	19.2%	N/A
Swing	▲5.8%	▼5.0%
- Winner of each seat at the 2023 Bromsgrove District Council election
Leader before election
Karen May
Conservative
Leader after election
Karen May
Conservative
No overall control

The 2023 Bromsgrove District Council election took place on 4 May 2023 to elect members of the Bromsgrove District Council in England. It was held on the same day as other local elections across England.

== Summary ==
The council was under Conservative majority control prior to the election. Following the election the Conservatives remained the largest party but lost their majority, leaving the council under no overall control.

An administration comprising the Conservatives and independent councillors subsequently formed, with Conservative leader Karen May continuing to serve as leader of the council.

== Overall result ==
2023 Bromsgrove District Council election
Party	Candidates	Seats	Gains	Losses	Net gain/loss	Seats %	Votes %	Votes	+/−
Conservative	31	11	2	8	▼6	35.5	37.2	10,061	-7.0
Labour	22	8	3	0	▲3	25.8	22.6	6131	+0.7
Independent	13	7	3	1	▲2	22.6	18.3	4967	+1.4
Liberal Democrats	21	5	3	1	▲2	16.1	19.2	5198	+5.8
Green	9	0	0	0	Steady	0.0	2.7	741	+0.9
Reform	1	0	0	0	Steady	0.0	0.2	63	+0.2
TUSC	2	0	0	0	Steady	0.0	0.2	63	+0.2
Residents	0	0	0	1	▼1	0.0	0.0	0	–5.0

== Ward results ==
The results for each ward were as follows, with an asterisk (*) indicating an incumbent councillor standing for re-election:

=== Alvechurch South ===
Alvechurch South
Party	Candidate	Votes	%	±%
Independent	Alan Bailes	531	57.2	N/A
Conservative	Spencer Loades	231	24.9	▼12.5
Labour	Eric Godfrey	131	14.1	▲9.0
Liberal Democrats	Suzanne Nicholl	34	3.7	▼1.0
Majority		300	32.4	
Turnout		929	40.4	▼6.2
Registered electors		2,298		
Independent gain from Independent		Swing		

=== Alvechurch Village ===
Alvechurch Village
Party	Candidate	Votes	%	±%
Independent	Rachel Bailes	487	55.5	N/A
Labour	Martin Mcleod	166	18.9	▲14.3
Conservative	Barry Thornton	133	15.1	▲4.6
Green	Martin Ball	64	7.3	N/A
Liberal Democrats	Rebecca Stevens	25	2.8	N/A
Majority		321	36.7	
Turnout		878	38.8	
Registered electors		2,265		
Independent gain from Independent		Swing		

=== Aston Fields ===
Aston Fields
Party	Candidate	Votes	%	±%
Labour	Jane Elledge	347	35.8	▼14.1
Conservative	Kyle Daisley	283	29.2	▼20.7
Liberal Democrats	Martine Reynolds	277	28.6	N/A
Green	Nick Trow	56	5.8	N/A
Majority		64	6.6	
Turnout		968	38.3	▲3.2
Registered electors		2,528		
Labour gain from Conservative		Swing	▲3.3	

=== Avoncroft ===
Avoncroft
Party	Candidate	Votes	%	±%
Liberal Democrats	David Nicholl	409	44.3	▲20.0
Labour	John Ellis	322	34.9	▲8.0
Conservative	Philip Thomas*	189	20.5	▼30.2
Majority		87	9.5	
Turnout		923	32.6	▲0.3
Registered electors		2,832		
Liberal Democrats gain from Conservative		Swing	▲25.1	

=== Barnt Green & Hopwood ===
Barnt Green & Hopwood
Party	Candidate	Votes	%	±%
Independent	Charlie Hotham*	682	68.5	▼13.6
Conservative	Amritjot Nannar	185	18.6	▲0.7
Labour	Kiran Gulia	123	12.4	N/A
Majority		497	50.2	
Turnout		995	41.7	▼4.7
Registered electors		2,384		
Independent hold		Swing	▼7.2	

=== Belbroughton & Romsley ===
Belbroughton & Romsley (2 seats)
Party	Candidate	Votes	%	±%
Conservative	Karen May*	1,354	68.8	▼7.7
Conservative	Simon Nock	1,096	55.7	▼15.5
Labour	Ros Cooke	381	19.3	▲1.4
Independent	Susan Jones	316	16.0	N/A
Independent	Gary Prescott	287	14.6	N/A
Independent	Stan Francis	107	5.4	N/A
Majority		715	20.2	
Turnout		1969	37.0	▲3.1
Registered electors		5,316		
Conservative hold				
Conservative hold				

=== Bromsgrove Central ===
Bromsgrove Central
Party	Candidate	Votes	%	±%
Liberal Democrats	Siobhan Robinson*	763	72.9	▲22.8
Conservative	Luv Datta	154	14.7	▼21.1
Labour	David Peters	118	11.3	▼2.8
Majority		609	58.8	
Turnout		1047	44.7	▼1.4
Registered electors		2,345		
Liberal Democrats hold		Swing	▲22.0	

- The Conservative candidate announced his withdrawal on 17 April although his name remained on the ballot paper.

=== Catshill North ===
Catshill North
Party	Candidate	Votes	%	±%
Independent	Bernard McEldowney	203	36.0	N/A
Labour	Andrew Glanville	191	33.9	▼8.6
Conservative	Mohammed Amin	141	25.0	▼32.5
Liberal Democrats	Martin German	29	5.1	N/A
Majority		12	2.1	
Turnout		565	26.5	▲0.1
Registered electors		2,134		
Independent gain from Conservative		Swing	▲34.2	

=== Catshill South ===
Catshill South
Party	Candidate	Votes	%	±%
Conservative	Shirley Webb*	300	51.1	▼8.0
Labour	Jenny Smith	204	34.8	▲17.9
Liberal Democrats	Barbara Murphy	77	13.1	▲6.4
Majority		96	16.5	
Turnout		587	26.7	▲0.2
Registered electors		2,203		
Conservative hold		Swing	▼13.0	

=== Charford ===
Charford
Party	Candidate	Votes	%	±%
Labour	Sam Ammar	284	57.7	▼19.1
Conservative	Sam Johnson	146	29.7	▲6.5
Liberal Democrats	Gillian Bell	62	12.6	N/A
Majority		138	28.0	
Turnout		495	21.5	▼5.8
Registered electors		2,307		
Labour hold		Swing	▼12.8	

=== Cofton ===
Cofton
Party	Candidate	Votes	%	±%
Conservative	Anita Dale	318	37.5	▲5.8
Labour	Christine McDonald	277	28.5	▲16.1
Green	Jill Harvey	175	20.6	▲2.8
Liberal Democrats	David Nicklin	68	8.0	▼1.6
Majority		41	4.9	
Turnout		849	32.5	▲0.8
Registered electors		2,610		
Conservative hold		Swing	▼5.2	

=== Drakes Cross ===
Drakes Cross
Party	Candidate	Votes	%	±%
Independent	Sue Baxter*	372	56.5	▼1.7
Conservative	Trevor Holman	195	29.6	▼12.2
Green	Matt Tovey	48	7.3	N/A
Liberal Democrats	Alan Bell	43	6.5	N/A
Majority		177	26.9	
Turnout		661	27.1	▼5.4
Registered electors		2,441		
Independent gain from Residents		Swing		

- The Residents Association candidate changed affiliation to Independent.

=== Hagley East ===
Hagley East
Party	Candidate	Votes	%	±%
Conservative	Ruth Lambert	387	45.7	▲22.5
Independent	Lorraine Johnson	353	41.7	N/A
Liberal Democrats	Mark Gibbons	105	12.4	N/A
Majority		34	4.0	
Turnout		846	34.5	▼6.3
Registered electors		2,451		
Conservative gain from Independent		Swing		

=== Hagley West ===
Hagley West
Party	Candidate	Votes	%	±%
Independent	Steven Colella*	827	78.0	▲0.1
Conservative	Jayne Willetts	155	14.6	▼7.5
Green	Susan Robbins	78	7.4	N/A
Majority		672	63.4	
Turnout		1,062	35.8	▼6.8
Registered electors		2,971		
Independent hold		Swing		

=== Hill Top ===
Hill Top
Party	Candidate	Votes	%	±%
Labour	David Hopkins	401	67.1	▼23.6
Conservative	Martin Connellan	100	16.7	▲7.4
Liberal Democrats	Sara Woodhouse	55	9.2	N/A
TUSC	Chloe Leslie	42	7.0	N/A
Majority		301	50.3	
Turnout		602	33.2	▼9.2
Registered electors		1,814		
Labour hold		Swing	▼15.5	

=== Hollywood ===
Hollywood
Party	Candidate	Votes	%	±%
Conservative	Derek Forsythe	538	73.9	▲17.3
Labour	Douglas Bridger	186	9.4	▲16.1
Majority		352	48.6	
Turnout		728	31.0	▼5.9
Registered electors		2,346		
Conservative hold		Swing		

=== Lickey Hills ===
Lickey Hills
Party	Candidate	Votes	%	±%
Conservative	Bakul Kumar	522	55.2	▲11.6
Liberal Democrats	Janet King*	332	35.1	▼21.3
Labour	John Cochrane	87	9.2	N/A
Majority		190	20.2	
Turnout		945	42.2	▲2.3
Registered electors		2,242		
Conservative gain from Liberal Democrats		Swing		

=== Lowes Hill ===
Lowes Hill
Party	Candidate	Votes	%	±%
Liberal Democrats	Joshua Robinson	660	73.3	▲49.4
Conservative	Rod Laight*	233	25.9	▼20.7
Majority		427	47.8	
Turnout		900	35.1	▲3.5
Registered electors		2,561		
Liberal Democrats gain from Conservative		Swing		

=== Marlbrook ===
Marlbrook
Party	Candidate	Votes	%	±%
Conservative	Helen Jones*	439	50.6	▼5.8
Labour	Alan Cooper	220	25.3	▲6.3
Green	Peter Harvey	142	16.4	▼8.1
Reform	Mason Koh Cherrington	63	7.3	n/a
Majority		219	25.3	
Turnout		868	36.3	▲0.2
Registered electors		2,394		
Conservative hold		Swing		

=== Norton ===
Norton
Party	Candidate	Votes	%	±%
Liberal Democrats	Robert Hunter*	926	89.4	▲12.7
Conservative	Kumar Muniandy	110	10.6	▼12.7
Majority		816	78.8	▲25.4
Turnout		1,043	40.7	▲1.1
Registered electors		2,560		
Liberal Democrats hold		Swing	+12.7	

=== Perryfields ===
Perryfields
Party	Candidate	Votes	%	±%
Conservative	Kit Taylor	240	47.3	▼9.8
Labour	Antony Maslen	175	34.5	▼8.4
Liberal Democrats	Joanna McKenna	90	17.8	N/A
Majority		65	12.9	
Turnout		507	33.5	▼4.0
Registered electors		1,512		
Conservative hold		Swing		

=== Rock Hill ===
Rock Hill
Party	Candidate	Votes	%	±%
Labour	Harrison Rone-Clarke*	453	61.2	▲15.8
Conservative	Richard Williams	170	23.0	▼10.2
Liberal Democrats	Christopher Appleyard	69	9.3	▲0.5
Green	Lee Rowley	41	5.5	N/A
Majority		283	38.6	
Turnout		740	30.7	▼0.5
Registered electors		2,409		
Labour hold		Swing		

=== Rubery North ===
Rubery North
Party	Candidate	Votes	%	±%
Labour	Peter McDonald*	518	64.4	▼2.6
Conservative	Andrew Beaumont*	278	34.6	▲1.6
Majority		240	30.2	
Turnout		804	33.7	▲0.5
Registered electors		2,386		
Labour hold		Swing		

=== Rubery South ===
Rubery South
Party	Candidate	Votes	%	±%
Labour	Esther Gray	465	56.3	▲19.8
Conservative	Nick Psirides	289	35.0	▼4.7
Green	Julian Gray	67	7.6	▲0.5
Majority		176	21.4	
Turnout		826	32.6	▼3.5
Registered electors		2,538		
Labour gain from Conservative		Swing		

=== Sanders Park ===
Sanders Park
Party	Candidate	Votes	%	±%
Labour	Mick Marshall	347	37.5	▼6.9
Liberal Democrats	Vanessa Verlinden	243	26.3	N/A
Conservative	Mark Boulton	198	21.4	▼34.2
Independent	David Pardoe	138	14.9	N/A
Majority		104	11.2	
Turnout		926	33.5	▲1.1
Registered electors		2,768		
Labour gain from Conservative		Swing		

=== Sidemoor ===
Sidemoor
Party	Candidate	Votes	%	±%
Labour	Graeme Stewart	352	45.4	▲4.7
Liberal Democrats	James Clarke	213	27.5	▲5.3
Conservative	Henry Morris	183	23.6	▼13.6
TUSC	Judi Byrne	21	2.7	N/A
Majority		139	18.1	
Turnout		775	28.7	▲1.6
Registered electors		2,697		
Labour hold		Swing		

=== Slideslow ===
Slideslow
Party	Candidate	Votes	%	±%
Liberal Democrats	Samuel Evans	637	64.2	▲46.7
Conservative	Michael Thompson	342	34.5	▼30.5
Majority		295	30.1	
Turnout		992	36.7	▲1.4
Registered electors		2,701		
Liberal Democrats gain from Conservative		Swing		

=== Tardebigge ===
Tardebigge
Party	Candidate	Votes	%	±%
Conservative	Peter Whittaker*	442	55.1	▼1.4
Labour	Sean Shannon	198	24.1	▲9.0
Liberal Democrats	Valerie Clarke	110	13.4	▲4.4
Green	John Smout	70	8.5	N/A
Majority		244	29.8	
Turnout		823	34.1	▼2.7
Registered electors		2,417		
Conservative hold		Swing		

=== Wythall East ===
Wythall East
Party	Candidate	Votes	%	±%
Conservative	Justin Stanley	378	54.2	▲3.0
Independent	Keith Yates	311	44.6	N/A
Majority		67	9.7	
Turnout		697	28.3	▼5.6
Registered electors		2,461		
Conservative hold		Swing		

=== Wythall West ===
Wythall West
Party	Candidate	Votes	%	±%
Independent	Stephen Peters	353	50.9	N/A
Conservative	Geoff Denaro*	336	48.5	▼1.0
Majority		17	2.5	
Turnout		693	30.0	▼3.1
Registered electors		2,309		
Independent gain from Conservative		Swing		

== Changes 2023–2027 ==
- In June 2024, Charford councillor Sam Ammar, chair of Bromsgrove Constituency Labour Party and chairman of Bromsgrove District Council, resigned from the Labour Party to sit as an independent, citing a dispute with the national party's leadership and candidate selection process.

=== By-elections ===
==== Sidemoor ====
A by-election was held in Sidemoor on 19 September 2024, following the departure of Labour councillor Graeme Stewart, who had been elected in May 2023. No reason for his departure had been given at the time the by-election was called.

Sidemoor By-Election 19 September 2024
Party	Candidate	Votes	%	±%
Liberal Democrats	James Clarke	276	52.6	+25.1
Conservative	Rita Dent	141	26.9	+3.3
Labour	Jennifer Smith	87	16.6	−28.8
Green	Peter Measham	21	4.0	+4.0
Majority		135	25.7	
Rejected ballots		2	0.38	
Turnout		527	19.69	
Registered electors		2,676		
Liberal Democrats gain from Labour		Swing		

==== Marlbrook ====
Marlbrook by-election: 26 November 2026
Party	Candidate	Votes	%	±%
Green	Lockie Carbery			
Labour	Geraint Lewis			
Conservative	Cathy Perruzza			
Reform	Nik Price			
Liberal Democrats	Kim Routley			
Majority				
Turnout				
		Swing		
