= Bromsgrove District =

Coordinates: 52.335°N 2.058°W

- Non-metropolitan district
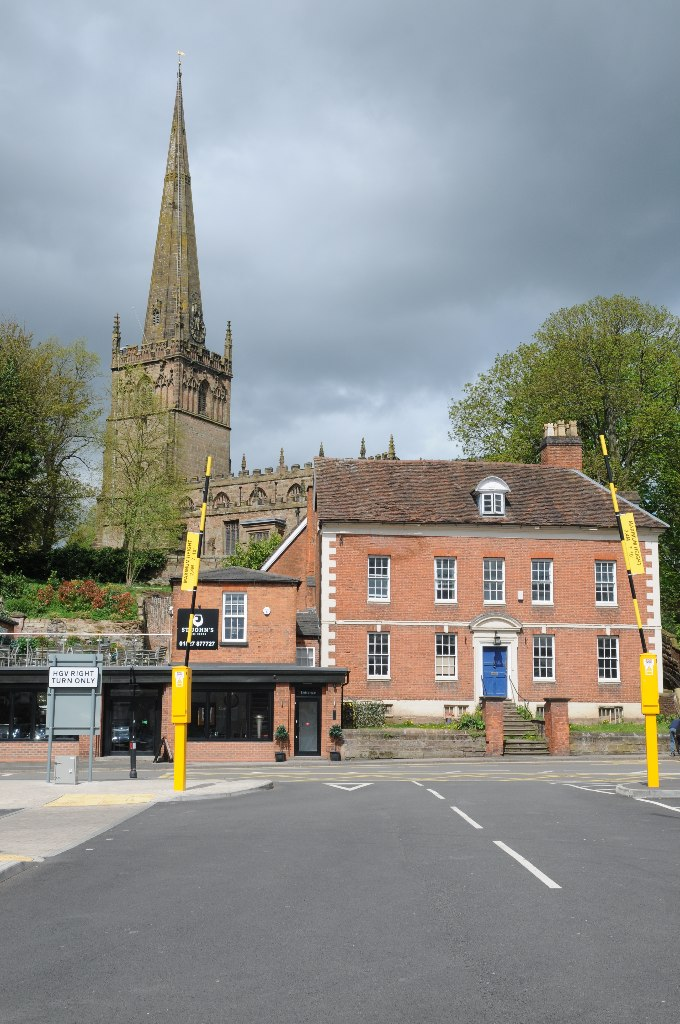
- Bromsgrove, the largest settlement and administrative centre of the district.

- Bromsgrove shown within Worcestershire
- Sovereign state: United Kingdom
- Constituent country: England
- Region: West Midlands
- Non-metropolitan county: Worcestershire
- Status: Non-metropolitan district
- Admin HQ: Bromsgrove
- Incorporated: 1 April 1974

Government
  - Type: Non-metropolitan district council
  - Body: Bromsgrove District Council
  - Leadership: Leader & Cabinet (No overall control)
  - MPs: Bradley Thomas

Area
  - Total: 83.8 sq mi (217.0 km^{2})
  - Rank: 139th (of 296)

Population (2024)
  - Total: 101,685
  - Rank: 246th (of 296)
  - Density: 1,214/sq mi (468.6/km^{2})

Ethnicity (2021)
  - Ethnic groups: List: 93.1% White; 3.2% Asian; 2.4% Mixed; 0.8% Black; 0.5% other

Religion (2021)
  - Religion: List: 53.5% Christianity; 37.4% no religion; 0.9% Islam; 0.7% Hinduism; 0.1% Judaism; 1.2% Sikhism; 0.3% Buddhism; 0.4% other; 5.6% not stated
- Time zone: UTC0 (GMT)
  - Summer (DST): UTC+1 (BST)
- ONS code: 47UB (ONS); E07000234 (GSS)
- OS grid reference: SO9604870812

Bromsgrove is a local government district in north-east Worcestershire, England. It is named after its only town, Bromsgrove, where its council is based, but also includes several villages and surrounding rural areas. It borders the built-up area of Birmingham to the north. Other places in the district include Alvechurch, Aston Fields, Belbroughton, Catshill, Clent, Hagley, Rubery, Stoke Prior and Wythall. The population at the 2021 census was 99,475.

The neighbouring districts are Redditch, Wychavon, Wyre Forest, South Staffordshire, Dudley, Birmingham, Solihull and Stratford-on-Avon.

== History ==
The town of Bromsgrove had been governed by improvement commissioners from 1846, who were replaced by an elected local board in 1859, which in turn was converted into an urban district council in 1894.

The modern district was formed on 1 April 1974 under the Local Government Act 1972. The new district covered the area of two former districts, which were both abolished at the same time:

- Bromsgrove Urban District
- Bromsgrove Rural District

The new district was named Bromsgrove after its largest settlement.

== Abolition ==
Under current local government reorganisation plans, all district councils in Worcestershire, as well as the county council, will be abolished in 2028, with the district forming part of a new North Worcestershire unitary authority, also including the area of the Redditch and Wyre Forest districts.

== Governance ==
Bromsgrove District Council

Type
- Type: Non-metropolitan district

Leadership
- Chair: Joshua Robinson, Liberal Democrat since 20 May 2026
- Leader: Karen May, Conservative since 22 May 2019
- Chief Executive: John Leach since 2025

Structure
- Seats: 31 councillors
- Graph of the party split among 31 seats.
- Political groups: Administration (13) Conservative (11) Independent (2) Other parties (18) Liberal Democrats (7) Labour (6) Independent (5)
- Length of term: 4 years

Elections
- Voting system: First past the post
- Last election: 4 May 2023

Meeting place
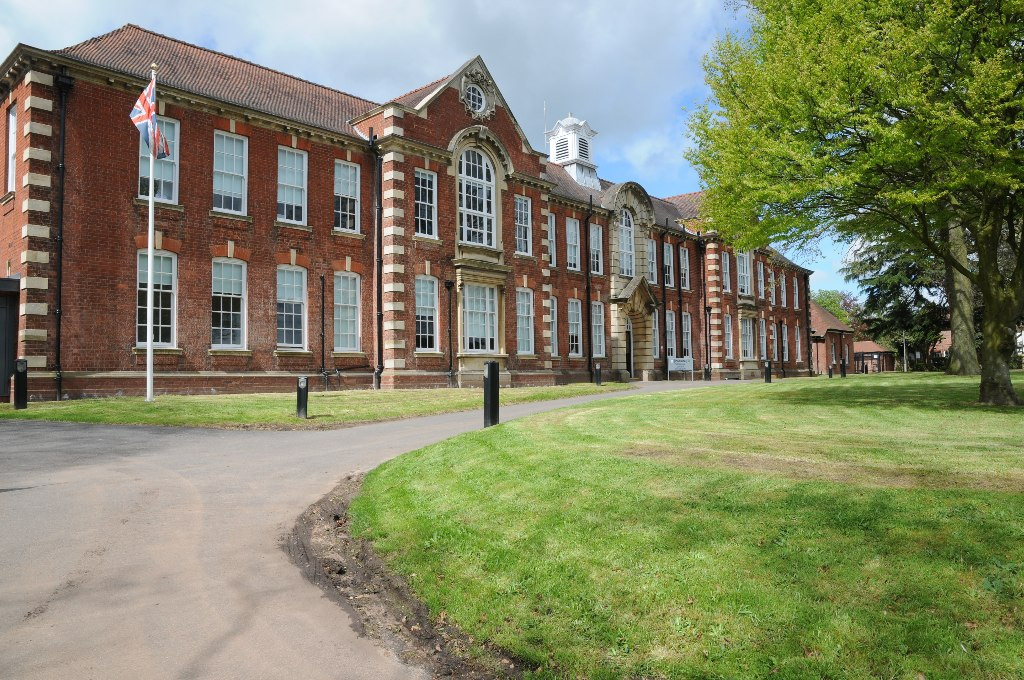
- Parkside, Market Street, Bromsgrove, B61 8DA

Website
- www.bromsgrove.gov.uk

Bromsgrove District Council provides district-level services. County-level services are provided by Worcestershire County Council. Much of the district is also covered by civil parishes, which form a third tier of local government for their areas.

Bromsgrove forms part of the Greater Birmingham & Solihull Local Enterprise Partnership. Since 2008 the council has developed shared working arrangements with neighbouring Redditch Borough Council, with the two organisations sharing a chief executive, management team and other staff.

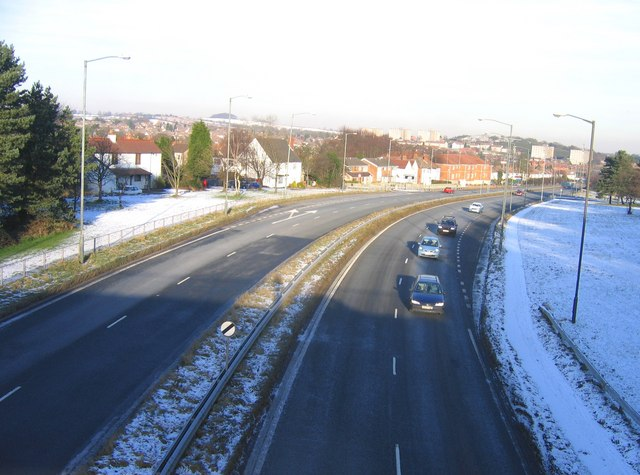
Rubery, which straddles the border between Bromsgrove and Birmingham.

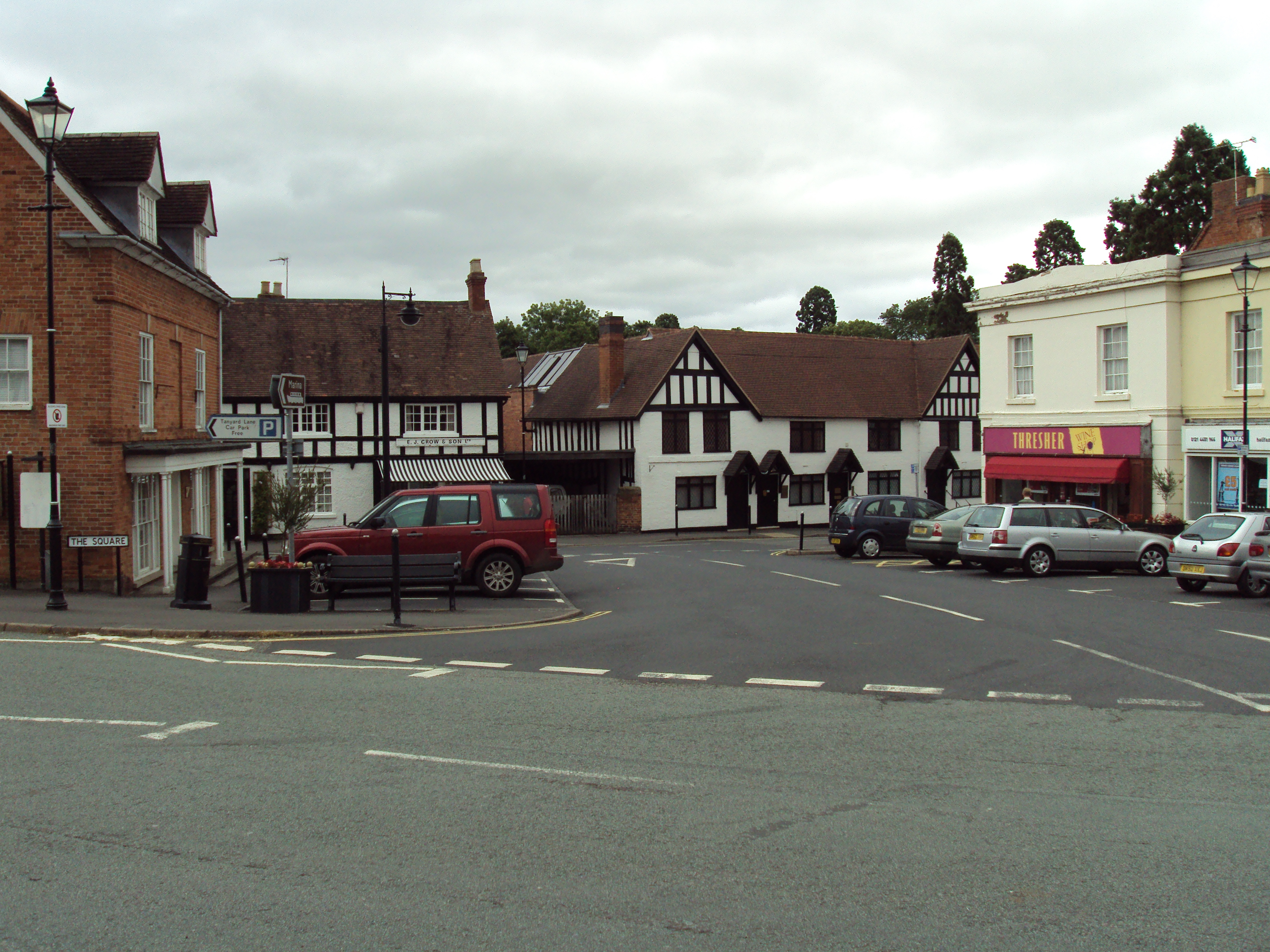
Alvechurch, one of the many rural villages in the district

=== Political control ===
The council has been under no overall control since the 2023 election, being run by an administration comprising the Conservatives and most of the independents, led by Conservative councillor Karen May.

The first election to the council was held in 1973, initially operating as a shadow authority alongside the outgoing councils before coming into its powers on 1 April 1974. Since 1974 political control of the council has been as follows:

Party in control	Years
Conservative	1974–1995
Labour	1995–1999
Conservative	1999–2023
No overall control	2023–present

=== Leadership ===
The leaders of the council since 1987 have been:

Councillor	Party	From	To
Henry Chattin	Conservative		May 1987
Rita Taylor	Conservative	1987	May 1992
Nick Psirides	Conservative	May 1992	May 1995
Trevor Porter	Labour	May 1995	May 1999
Nick Psirides	Conservative	May 1999	May 2002
Dennis Norton	Conservative	May 2002	26 Sep 2005
Roger Hollingworth	Conservative	19 Oct 2005	14 May 2014
Margaret Sherrey	Conservative	14 May 2014	29 Jun 2016
Geoff Denaro	Conservative	20 Jul 2016	22 May 2019
Karen May	Conservative	22 May 2019	

=== Composition ===
Following the 2023 election, and subsequent changes of allegiance up to May 2026, the composition of the council was:

Party	Councillors
Conservative	11
Liberal Democrats	7
Labour	6
Independent	7
Total	31

Five of the independent councillors sit together as the "2025 Independents" group, and the other two are not aligned to a group.

=== Elections ===
Since the last boundary changes in 2015 the council has comprised 31 councillors representing 30 wards, with each ward electing one councillor except Belbroughton and Romsley ward which elects two. Elections are held every four years.

=== Premises ===
The council is based at Parkside, at the corner of Market Street and Stourbridge Road. The building was formerly the Parkside School, built in 1912. The school moved to a new building in 2008. The old building was subsequently converted and extended to become the council's headquarters, as well as an area office for Worcestershire County Council and new library for the town, opening in 2015.

When first created in 1974 the council had inherited offices at St John's Court (then known as the Council House) from Bromsgrove Urban District Council and at 94 Birmingham Road from Bromsgrove Rural District Council. The council subsequently moved to a modern office building on Burcot Lane, also called the Council House, which was formally opened in 1986. It remained there until the move to Parkside in 2015. The Burcot Lane building has since been demolished.

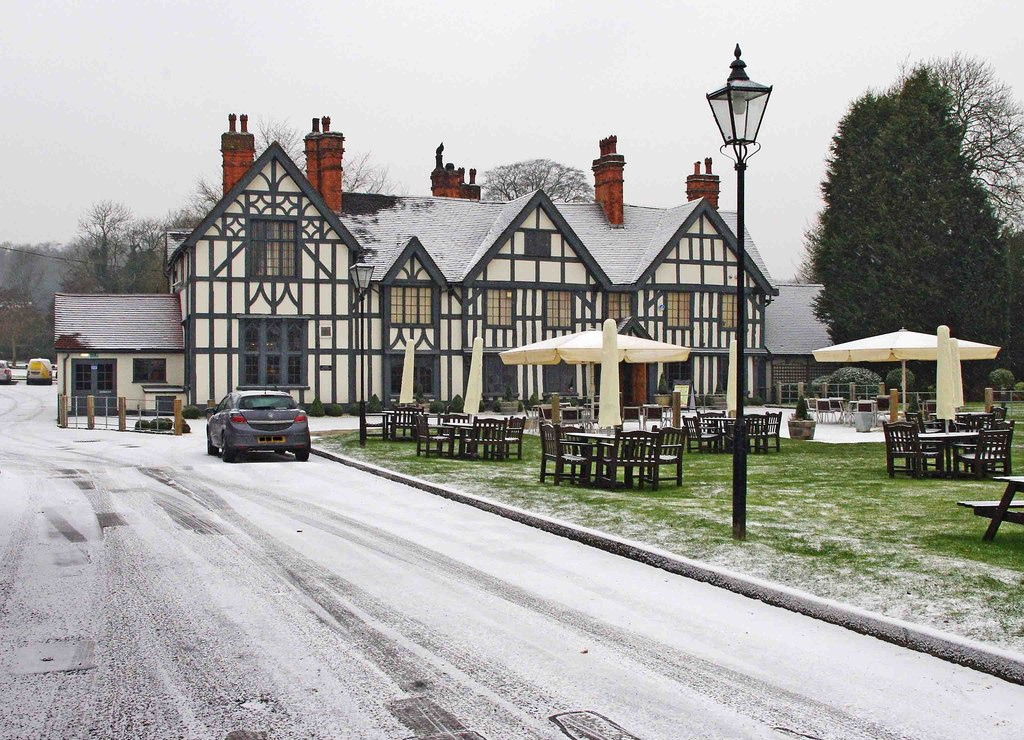
Barnt Green, one of the many outlying villages in the district

== Transport ==
Bromsgrove railway station is the local station for the district's centre, but there are several others within the district. Road travel, especially to Birmingham, is also important in the district.

Barnt Green railway station and Alvechurch railway station are on the line to Redditch.

Hagley railway station and Wythall railway station are also on lines leading into Birmingham, which pass through the edges of the district.

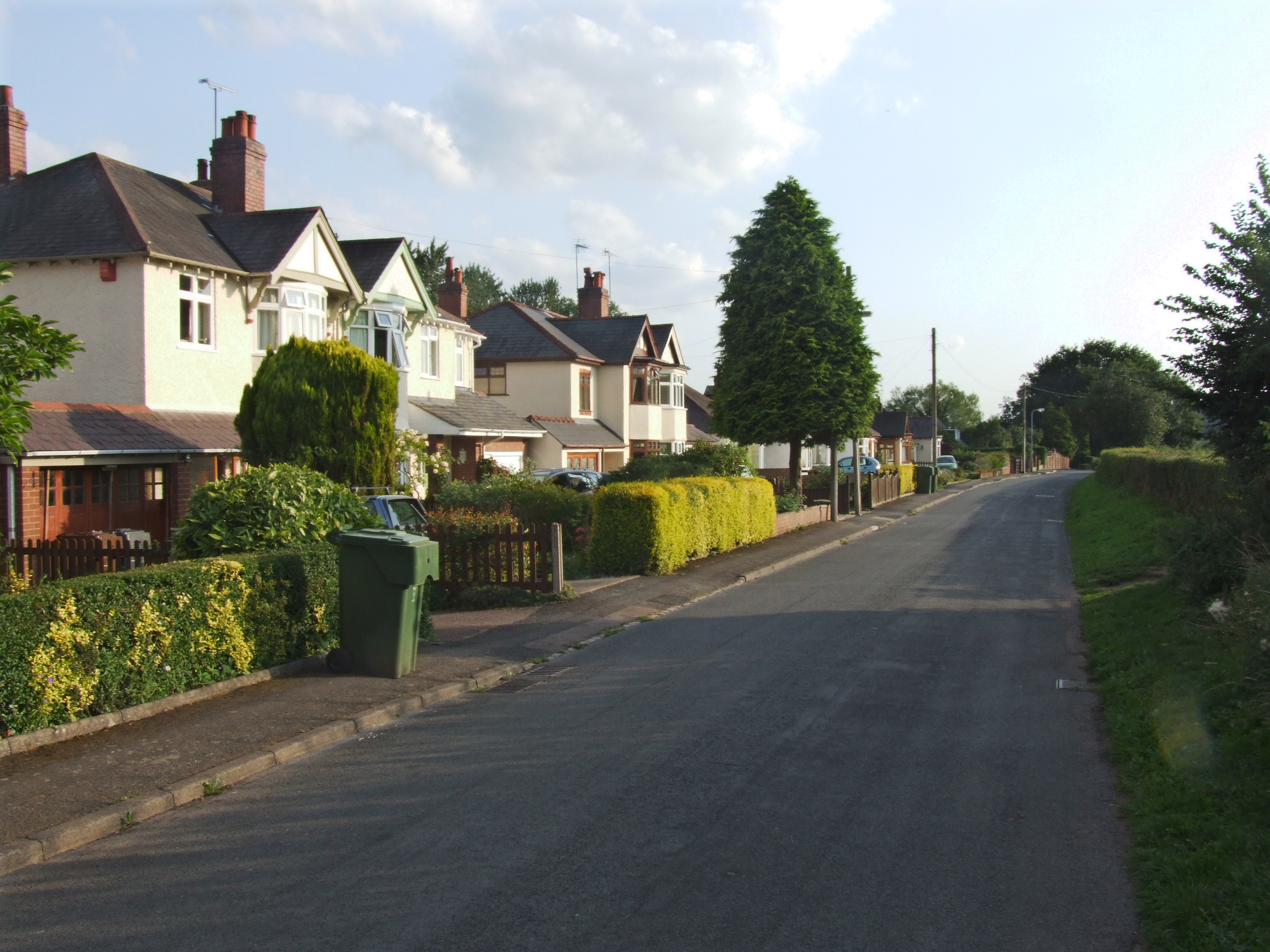
Hagley, one of the many villages in the district and also forms a small part of the Black Country near both Stourbridge and Halesowen.

Bromsgrove is situated on Route 5 and 46 of the National Cycle Network. This gives cyclists easy access to Droitwich, Redditch, Birmingham and beyond.

== Parishes ==
Most of the district's area is covered by civil parishes, the exceptions being two separate parts of the pre-1974 Bromsgrove Urban District which have not since been added to parishes: one covering the main part of the Bromsgrove built-up area, and another around Rubery on the northern edge of the district adjoining Birmingham. At the 2021 census, nearly half the district's population lived in the unparished areas. The most populous parishes are Wythall (which also contains the large village of Hollywood) and Hagley. Each parish has a parish council.

== Population ==
The following table illustrates the change in the population of the area that makes up the modern district between 1801 and 2011.

Year	Population
1801	14,486
1811	16,330
1821	18,312
1831	20,720
1841	21,124
1851	22,960
1861	27,321
1871	31,682
1881	36,043
1891	41,992
1901	44,224
1911	46,574
1921	44,176
1931	41,903
1941	50,338
1951	60,470
1961	68,919
1971	78,555
1981	86,982
1991	92,251
2001	87,486
2011	93,600

== See also ==
- New Frankley
- Bromsgrove Parliamentary Constituency
