= Foundation of the Schools of King Edward VI =

Foundation of The Schools of King Edward VI in Birmingham

Location
- Foundation Office, Edgbaston Park Road; Edgbaston, Birmingham, West Midlands, B15 2UD; England; 52.45018°N 1.92629°W

Information
- Type: Charitable trust (foundation)
- Motto: "Educational excellence for our City"
- Religious affiliation: Church of England
- Established: 1552 or 1883
- Founder: Guild of the Holy Cross
- Locale: Birmingham
- CEO: Jodh Dhesi
- Chair: Prof Hywel Thomas, PhD
- Vice Chair: Erica Conway, ACA
- Age: 11 to 18
- Website: kingedwardvifoundation.co.uk

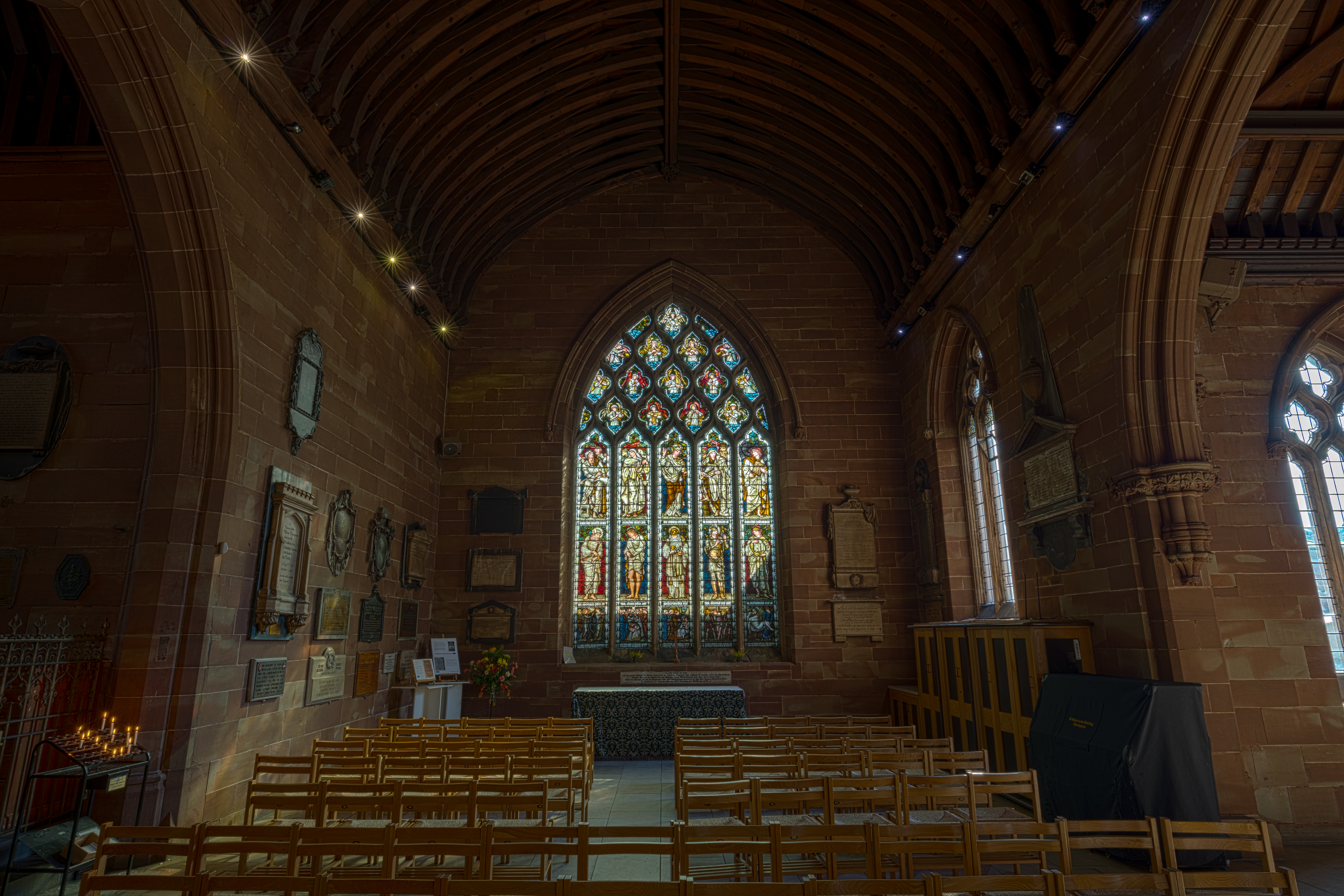
Interior of St Martin in the Bull Ring, regarded as the birthplace of the Foundation

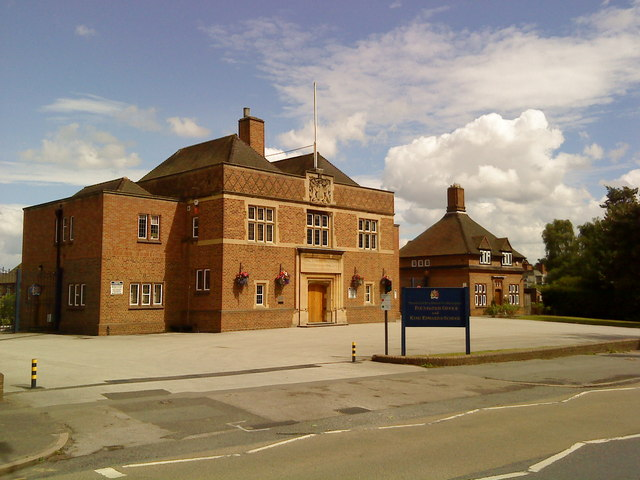
The present-day Foundation Office, located at the entrance to King Edward's School

The King Edward VI Foundation Birmingham is a charitable institution that operates thirteen schools in Birmingham, England.

The Foundation was registered as a charity in November 1963 under the name "The Schools of King Edward VI in Birmingham". As of September 2022, the Foundation operates two independent schools and a multi-academy trust called the King Edward VI Academy Trust Birmingham, consisting of six selective schools, and five non-selective academy schools.

In 2019/20 the Foundation had a gross income of approximately £21 million, much of which is derived from extensive land holdings in the centre of Birmingham. The Academy Trust has a further income of approximately £47 million.

== Origins ==
On 28 October 1382, a chantry to say masses for the dead was established in New Street, Birmingham. As part of the religious settlement of King Henry VIII, laws were enacted suppressing all monasteries and chantries. In the case of chantries, little had occurred since the 1545 Act, so when King Edward VI came to the throne in 1547 new legislation to close chantries was soon enacted. Part of the process of suppressing chantries involved holding an inquiry into their property and assets. The New Street chantry was one of thousands abolished, though the people of Birmingham were told that the assets would not be seized by the Crown but made available for educational purposes.

When the assets still had not been returned to the town, a meeting was held at St Martin in the Bull Ring to petition the Crown to build a school on New Street on the land occupied by the former chantry. The Guild of the Holy Cross persuaded the Earl of Northumberland to release the land at New Street for the creation of a free Grammar School; a charter for its formation was issued on 2 January 1552 and King Edward VI School was opened in the chantry's hall. In 1883 a complementary Girls' School was formed, initially sharing the same site as the Boys' School.

Independent Schools
School	Founded	Original Location	Current Location	Since	Gender
King Edward's School (KES)	1552	New Street (Guild Hall)	Edgbaston	1936	Boys
King Edward VI High School for Girls (KEHS)	1883	New Street (Barry Building)	Edgbaston	1936	Girls

== Victorian expansion ==
Owning land in the very centre of Birmingham gave the Foundation a secure financial base. In 1883, five new King Edward's schools were created to meet the educational needs of the expanding population of the city of Birmingham.

Due to financial difficulties, many of the schools were forced to sell the land of their original location to buy the cheaper land from the surrounding area in the city. Many of the schools have since changed location since their founding, with only Aston remaining in its original buildings.

All of the Foundation's grammar schools are now a part of the King Edward VI Academy Trust.

Selective (Grammar) Schools
School	Founded	Original Location	Current Location	Since	Gender
King Edward VI Aston School	1883	Aston		—	Boys
King Edward VI Camp Hill School for Boys	1883	Camp Hill	Kings Heath	1956	Boys
King Edward VI Camp Hill School for Girls	1883	Camp Hill	Kings Heath	1956	Girls
King Edward VI Five Ways School (KEFW)	1883	Five Ways	Bartley Green	1957	Mixed
King Edward VI Handsworth School	1883	Aston (with King Edward VI Aston)	Handsworth	1911	Girls

== King Edward VI Academy Trust ==
Logo used by the King Edward VI Academy Trust Birmingham since 2017

In 2013 the Foundation took control of Sheldon Heath Community College and it was renamed King Edward VI Sheldon Heath Academy. This marked the first time the Foundation had taken control of an existing educational establishment and its first non-selective school.

In September 2017 the Foundation divided the operation of its two independent schools (KES and KEHS) and its multiple grammar schools – including the non-selective KEVI Sheldon Heath Academy. A Multi-academy trust, known as the King Edward VI Academy Trust Birmingham, was formed to manage its non–fee-paying establishments, consisting of five grammar schools and one academy.

With the formation of the Academy Trust, the previously independent Handsworth Grammar School joined the foundation, becoming King Edward VI Handsworth Grammar School for Boys. Since then, the Academy Trust has taken control of one educational establishment each year with the exception of 2020 (due to the COVID-19 pandemic).

The Academy Trust inductee for the 2023/24 academic year is King's Norton School for Boys, having received approval in 2023. The school is expected to formally join in January 2024.

Recent additions to the Academy Trust
School	Founded	Location	Previous Name	Joined	Gender
King Edward VI Sheldon Heath Academy (KESH)	1955	Sheldon	Sheldon Heath Community Arts College	2013	Mixed
King Edward VI Handsworth Grammar School for Boys (HGS)	1862	Handsworth	Handsworth Grammar School	2017	Boys
King Edward VI Handsworth Wood Girls' Academy (HWGA)	1957	Handsworth Wood	Handsworth Wood Girls' Academy	2018	Girls
King Edward VI Balaam Wood Academy	1981	New Frankley	Balaam Wood School	2019	Mixed
King Edward VI Northfield School for Girls	1939	Turves Green	Turves Green Girls' School	2021	Girls
King Edward VI Lordswood School for Girls	1958	Harborne	Lordswood Girls' School	2022	Girls

Upcoming additions to the Academy Trust
School	Founded	Location	Expected Induction	Gender
King's Norton Boys' School (KNBS)	(c.1550); 1912	Kings Norton	September 2023	Boys

== Foundation Service ==
Since the expansion of the Foundation in 1883, Year 7 pupils from each school of the Foundation have met once a year at either St Martin's Church or the Aston Webb Building's Great Hall at the University of Birmingham for a service to commemorate the King Edward VI Foundation. At this service, pupils have historically read from The Bible, sung hymns, and been told the story of the creation of the Foundation. More recently, pupils have engaged in musical performances, short plays, and recited poems.

== Bibliography ==
- King Edward Grammar School for Girls, Handsworth 1883–1983, Alison Thorne, 1983
- King Edward High School Birmingham 1883–1983, Rachel Waterhouse, 1983
- King Edward VI Five Ways 1883-1983, David Wheeldon, 1983
- King Edward's School, Birmingham, Tony Trott, 2001, ISBN 0-7524-2448-3
- Victoria County History of England, Volume on Warwickshire, article by Tyson, J.C.
