= West Heath, West Midlands =

Area of Birmingham, England

Coordinates: 52.3967°N 1.9575°W

West Heath
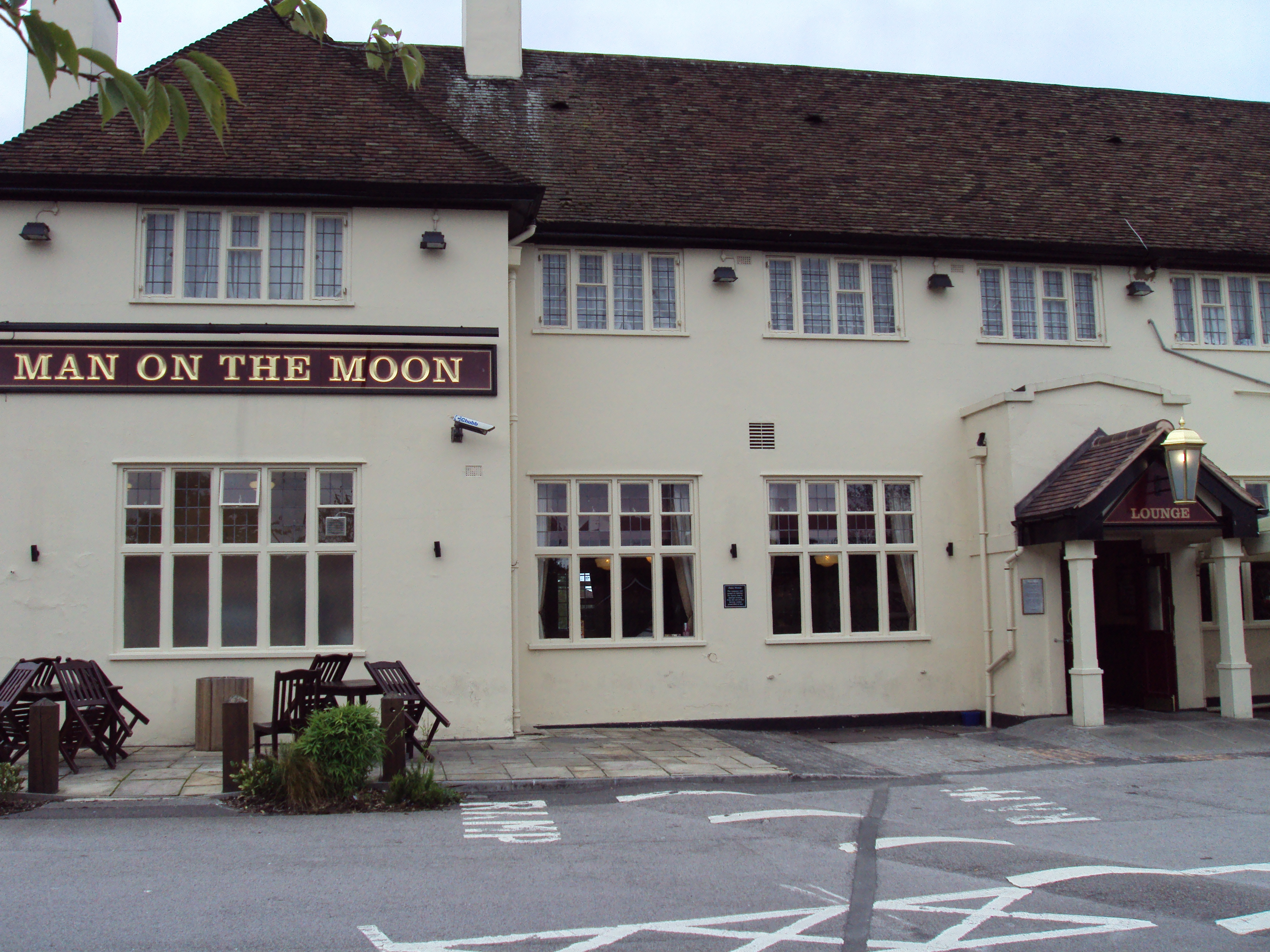
- Man on the Moon Pub, Redditch Road/Redhill Road, West Heath

- Location within the West Midlands
- OS grid reference: SP029776
- Metropolitan borough: Birmingham
- Metropolitan county: West Midlands
- Region: West Midlands
- Country: England
- Sovereign state: United Kingdom
- Post town: BIRMINGHAM
- Postcode district: B31, B38
- Dialling code: 0121
- Police: West Midlands
- Fire: West Midlands
- Ambulance: West Midlands
- UK Parliament: Birmingham Northfield

West Heath is a residential area of Birmingham, England on the boundary with Worcestershire. Forming the larger part of the ward of Longbridge And West Heath it is situated between Kings Norton, Northfield, Longbridge and Cofton Hackett and lies on traditional heathland formed in the 13th century as part of the Kings Norton manorial lands, and was historically in Worcestershire.

Based on a small village formed in the early 1900s that was originally centred on the medieval Lilley Lane, the majority of West Heath's expansion and growth took place just after World War II. The original expansion in the 1940s and 1950s consisted of large numbers of prefab houses, most of which were eventually replaced by permanent housing estates in the 1960s and 1970s.

There are a number of buildings in West Heath that date to the 19th century and earlier. The suburb is adjacent to rural Worcestershire and a number of public footpaths allow open access to the surrounding fields up to Hopwood, Cofton Hackett and the Lickey Hills.

== History ==
=== Early history ===
In early Anglo-Saxon times, West Heath lay at the northernmost border of the lands of the Hwicce, a people who occupied the former territory of the British tribe, The Dobunni. As part of what would become Kings Norton, West Heath was positioned slightly to the north of the boundary between two tribes, the Pencersaetan and the Tomsaetan.

There is evidence of the previous presence of Romans in West Heath – in 1949, Roman coins of the reign of Emperor Hadrian were unearthed in Coney Green Drive in the Austin Village and there was a further discovery of coins of the reign of the Emperor Diocletian in 1966 in Hawkesley Drive, also in the Austin Village.

One of the earliest mentions of West Heath is in the Saxon lease of land at Coston Hackett in 849 AD detailing a grant by Worcester's Bishop Ealhhun to King Berhtwulf, King of Mercia. West Heath and parts of Kings Norton would remain part of Coston Hackett manor estates as late as the early 20th century. West Heath was mentioned in the manorial court roll of Bromsgrove and Kings Norton in 1267 when it was recorded that "Richard de Coſton has a purpresture (i.e. an enclosure of tenants land or an enclosure of waste land) upon Westhethe, Richard de Coſton holds four acres in Westhethe and does nothing in service to the King. Alexander and Gregory de Coſton hold land in Westhethe, Master John de Aluvechurch as (sic) 1 and half acres of purpresture upon "La Westhethe" by permission of Robert de Coſton". In 1494 it was recorded that "Baldwin Lyndon – banks in ruins between Hawkesley Pole and Westhethe...fined 2d" whilst the Abbot of Bordesley was fined 8d "through defect in cleansing the banks at West Hethe". In 1596, a woman called Joan was fined 6d because "she enclosed a parcel of the King's waste at West Heath".

Turves Green was known as Turvosland in 1490 and was the site for peat-cutting for fuel. There is a layer of peat a few feet below the surface and deeper still are successive layers of clay and a coal seam and a bloomery has been discovered – this is the first form of forge for smelting iron from ore leaving less bulk to transport for further smelting to refine the metal. In 1442 Turves Green had been named Le Grene Slave, Greenway Lane in 1780 and Green Lane in 1877.

During the English Civil War West Heath was on the border between royalist Worcestershire and parliamentary Warwickshire and there were regular minor skirmishes and conflicts between the forces of the two opposing sides. Situated off Turves Green, Hawkesley House, which belonged to the royalist George Middlemore and his family, was besieged and seized by parliamentary forces under Colonel Tinker Fox in April 1644. The Parliamentarians fortified the building but on 13 May 1645 Royalist forces under the king’s nephews Prince Rupert and Prince Maurice laid siege to Hawkesley House and were joined the following day by King Charles I who had been staying at nearby Cofton Hall. The Royalists took the house on 16 May and expelled the Parliamentary forces and razed the house to the ground. The inhabitants of West Heath would also have been aware of other clashes close by during the Civil War. Two miles away at Kings Norton Prince Rupert with eight troops of horses and 300 foot soldiers was engaged on 17 October 1642 on Kings Norton Green by a Parliamentary force of 800 foot soldiers and horsemen on its way to join the Earl of Essex at Worcester. The Royalists were routed by the Parliamentarians under Lord Willoughby Of Parham and fifty Royalist troops were killed and buried in an unmarked grave in King's Norton Churchyard. On 10 July 1643 Queen Henrietta Maria arrived in Kings Norton with 3000 horsemen, 30 companies of foot soldiers and artillery and camped there en route to Oxford where she planned to join King Charles. She passed the night in the ‘Saracen's Head’ while the location of the site where the soldiers camped is said to be where ‘The Camp’ public house is now located.

This historic association with the Civil War is marked by the naming of several roads in West Heath such as Fairfax Road, Cropredy Road, Edgehill Road and a public house named "The Cavalier" on Fairfax Rd.

William Middlemore rebuilt Hawkesley House in 1654 but by the 19th century its status was simply that of a farmhouse, called Hawkesley Farm, until it was demolished in 1957. A municipal block of flats – ‘Moat House’ – was built on the spot of the original Hawkesley House in 1971. The ancient moat can still be seen near Moat House.

From earliest times, what is now known as West Heath Road had been a trackway until 1796 when it was surfaced to become part of the Stourbridge to Wooten Wawen turnpike road. It remained a turnpike until 1820 with a toll-house at the junction of what are now Alvechurch and Redhill Roads, recorded in 1813. National censuses for the 19th century reveal that the inhabitants were principally farmers, agricultural labourers or nail-makers. West Heath formed a part of Kings Norton, linking Kings Norton isthmus-like to Rednal which was also part of the district and the area was principally used as livestock grazing land. The land was jealously guarded – in the fifteenth century, during the reign of Edward IV, the manor court ruled that "No man shall take in foreign cattle to keep on the common" and in 1641, John Brookes of Cofton Hackett was fined five shillings for keeping a great flock of sheep on the common, "being a foreigner". Alan The Bailiff in the fifteenth century, had been charged to "drive" the common two or three times a year to discover the nature of the stock being pastured there and to ensure that no one should keep above five colts, horses or mares upon the common. Inhabitants were sometimes fined for "encroaching" (enclosing small areas) on the common although these may actually have been payments to regularise a new practice rather than a form of punishment.

After the Civil War, a Parliamentary Survey of "The Manor of Kingsesnorton" produced in 1649 because the manor "was in the hands of Parliament by reason of the seizure of the lands of King Charles I", reported that "The soil of the heaths, wastes, and commons called.... West Heath, and the archery (and all of them do contain in the whole by estimate of 3,000 acres or thereabouts) are the lord's and the trees thereon growing and "the bitt" belong to the tenants".

By the 19th century there was considerable local poverty and those who lived on Cofton Common were described as "peasants" in a reminiscence of Alice Impey who lived at Longbridge House and who recalled that when someone died there it was necessary for her father to send a cart for the body to be taken to Cofton Church and buried in the pauper's section of the graveyard.

=== Nail making in West Heath ===
Apart from agriculture, nail making was the most notable industry in 19th-century West Heath. Numbers of nailers in West Heath are included in figures for Northfield and in the whole district there were 122 employed in the industry in 1831. However the industry was already in decline – in 1841 there were 74 nailers and in 1884 there were only twenty-three with only seven in West Heath. Nailers' workshops were present at Groveley, West Heath and Turves Green; the latter was still the site of hand-made nail production by Mr. Withers in Oak Tree Cottages as late as 1910 although the factory of The Patent Hob Nail & Rivet Company had been opened in Station Road in 1900. The nailers' workshops were usually little lean-to sheds built against the sides of the cottages with a brick-built small furnace.

=== 20th century residents ===
As well-drained open heath land, the area was not developed as a residential area until the early 1900s, containing only a few scattered agricultural buildings and latterly one or two grand houses in the Lilley Lane area. In 1907 Kelly's Directory Of Birmingham records that several middle class residents were living in the larger houses of West Heath including two professors of chemistry at the new University of Birmingham – Percy Faraday Frankland F.R.S. (son of Edward Frankland, an eminent scientist who discovered chemical valency and also godson of the famous physicist, Michael Faraday) lived at The Dell and Adrian John Brown F.R.S. (whose chair at the university was actually that of Malting and Brewing and who became a pioneer in enzyme kinetics) who lived with his family in West Heath House, which was the largest residence in the village but was demolished to make way for an Elderly Person's Home, situated at the junction of Alvechurch Road and Cofton Road. The replacement 1950s building was closed and demolished in 2016 and a newly built, 3-storey, 80-bedroom Residential Home, called "Austin Rose", was opened in Autumn 2017.

Groveley Hall: The earliest building on the site probably dated back to 1530 and had been a religious institution belonging to Westbury College in Bristol but it had been confiscated as a result of The Reformation and handed to Sir Ralph Sadler, Secretary of State to King Henry VIII, in 1536. In 1548 the property was bought by John Coombes and later by John Lyttleton and after 1600 by Francis Heaton. In the early nineteenth century the house belonged to Robert Middleton Biddulph from whose family John Merry obtained the property around 1820. It passed through the Merry family, eventually being purchased by Ambrose Biggs, a tobacco manufacturer and merchant who was also a mayor of Birmingham, in 1872. Biggs was declared bankrupt in 1883, at which point the estate was purchased by Joseph Billing Baldwin, paper maker of Kings Norton. The property remained in the Baldwin family until 1937. It became the home of Robert Jolly, a physician, his wife Fanny (Joseph B. Baldwin's daughter), and Baldwin's son Major James Baldwin (d.1922). Neither Fanny nor James had children. Fanny left the property to the National Trust in her will, intending it to be a holiday home for distressed gentlefolk. The nearby Dingle Farm, formerly the farmhouse serving the Groveley estate, remains in National Trust hands as a private property.

Elsewhere in West Heath, Lieutenant Meynell Hunt lived at Groveley House. The only houses on Cofton Common which are mentioned in the Directory were both owned by women – Mrs. Higgins at Fern Bank and Mrs. Avery.

The surname Hobbis had been particularly common in the area in the 19th century and people with that name included farmers, agricultural workers and (in Kings Norton village) the publican of the inn, The Plumber's Arms, but no one named Hobbis is listed in the 1907 Directory as owning property in West Heath although a small piece of land in what is now Alvechurch Road was known as Hobbis' Piece and was then owned by Adam Webb, chief clerk in an assurance company, another solid middle class inhabitant of that time in West Heath.

The only farmer recorded to be living in Turves Green in the late nineteenth century censuses was Thomas Morris, born in 1865, but in 1907 he was mentioned in Kelly's Directory as either living at Longbridge or Staple Old Road.

In 1874, the Impey family moved from Edgbaston to Longbridge House, which had been Prince Rupert's headquarters during the siege of Hawlesley House in 1645 during the Civil War. Frederick Impey was a partner in Messrs White and Pikes which owned a printing works in Moor Street in Birmingham and which was developing a method of colour printing onto tin. Impey opened a factory in the area to carry out this process but it was burned down in 1900 and not reopened. Herbert Austin subsequently bought the site to build premises for motor car manufacture. In 1910, the Impeys moved to "The Island", a large house in West Heath situated between Turves Green and West Heath Road, but moved away when Frederick Impey died in 1920. Like the Cadbury family who lived in neighbouring Northfield, the Impeys were Quakers and as well as being important developers of local industry, showed considerable interest in improving the lot of their factory workers.

The first post office in West Heath was opened on 5 June 1892 although the 1891 census records a rural postman, John Cook, to be living in West Heath. Mail was cancelled with the village's name by the use of a rubber canceller. The first postmaster of West Heath was William A. Jarvis who was recorded in the 1901 English census as also being a grocer at 37 West Heath Lane, the post office having been opened at that address in 1899 in the newly built "West Villas" and this coincided with the post office becoming a money office and savings bank on 1 May of that year. Jarvis's wife, Sarah, was described as "Postmistress" in 1901 and Jarvis remained the postmaster until 1912 by which time West Heath Lane had been renamed as Alvechurch Road and West Villas had been allocated the address of no. 53 Alvechurch Road. West Heath post office's status changed from that of a rural post office to a town sub-post office on 20 August 1916. It continues to operate but with very limited services.

=== Hospital ===
West Heath Hospital was established as an infectious diseases hospital in 1889, became a tuberculosis hospital in 1910 and was refocused as a geriatric hospital in 1980.

=== Expansion ===
In 1900 visitors arriving via Northfield railway station could visit the skating rink on West Heath Road next to the bridge over the river Rea. Unfortunately the skating rink was used during the First World War as a munitions factory and following an accident the rink was destroyed by fire.

In the 1930s small terraced houses that were built along Alvechurch Road and Sir Hilton's Road, and slightly grander semi-detached and detached houses, along West Heath Road and Redditch Road began to change the traditional rural nature of West Heath. The newer high density housing estates built two decades later would complete the change.

The rapid expansion of West Heath and its transition from open farmland to residential suburb of Birmingham had commenced in the years immediately after the Second World War when several extensive estates of pre-fab houses were quickly erected to house returning servicemen and families made homeless during wartime bombing raids.

Aerial photograph of the Bath Tub open air lido on Alvechurch Road, West Heath, pictured in the summer of 1938

Another notable building of the area was The Bath Tub open air lido (now demolished), opened on 1 July 1937 in Alvechurch Road, where 20,000 people had gathered to watch the opening ceremony by Gracie Fields with Mantovani and his orchestra and the M.P. for Northfield and Kings Norton, Ronald Cartland, the brother of Dame Barbara Cartland, the novelist. The lido which had been built by Percy Hollier who intended it to be "Birmingham's brightest entertainment spot" and which included a 180 feet by 90 feet sized swimming pool as well as a putting green, lawn for archery and a children's playground, only operated for 3 years and was closed due to commercial failure. Laughtons took over the site with Eddystone Radio during the war when its rural location helped it to avoid attack by German air raids. The lido site is now covered by a housing estate. There is also the art deco Man On The Moon pub on Redditch Road, which was built in 1937 (originally as The Man In The Moon but the name was changed in 1969 to commemorate the first Moon landing).

Prior to 1938, when a school was opened in Turves Green, children had attended St. Anne's Church School in West Heath. The headmistress of that school, Miss Mary Davies, was appointed to be headmistress at Turves Green where a junior school was first opened and then, in 1939, a school for seniors. A Catholic Primary School linked to the parish of St. John Fisher was opened in Alvechurch Road on 5 September 1961 on the remaining part of an industrial estate next to Hobbis' Piece to accommodate the large number of local children of Irish Catholic origin (at the time 60% of children attending the school passed their summer holidays in Ireland). A tree was donated to the school by the Birmingham Tree Lovers charity but was cut down in 2010 to make way for a car park.

In the 1950s the population of West Heath continued to increase and change considerably. Working-class families who had lived in central Birmingham in old unsuitable properties which were to be demolished and a considerable number of Irish immigrant families settled in the new homes on the newly built council estates around Cofton Common and the land between it and Turves Green. Local work was plentiful, especially at the Austin Motor Works at Longbridge and, for the women, at Cadbury's chocolate factory in Bournville or the Kalamazoo paper factory in Longbridge, which had been moved to the area by Oliver Morland and F. Paul Impey in 1913 from central Birmingham.

== West Heath today ==
=== Services ===
West Heath has a small, somewhat neglected shopping area on Alvechurch Road and there is an Art Deco building which previously housed a Co-Operative store which closed in 2018. Other facilities include a Chinese Food Takeaway shop, a Fish and Chip shop, a sandwich shop, an undertaker's, a dry cleaner's, two pharmacies and an optician's shop. The post office with very limited services is still located at "West Villas" on Alvechurch Road. There is a “Tesco Express” supermarket located in the building which previously housed “The Fordrough” public house.

Located on West Heath Road is a primary health care centre, built in 2011, replacing the former surgery which had been situated in a 1930s detached house neighbouring the previous residence of a former general practitioner, Dr Anthony (Antek) Bobak who had set up his practice in 1954. Another general practitioner's surgery, that of Dr. Shan, was located for many years on Alvechurch Road.

A children's nursery is also located on West Heath Road. There are other doctors' surgeries and nurseries in the area. West Heath Hospital is located on Rednal Road and nearby, on Ivyhouse Road, there is a rehabilitation hospital for people with brain injury. There are two elderly persons' homes, primary schools, a community centre in Hampstead House (a second community centre, Oddingley Hall, is actually situated in Kings Norton), recreation grounds and other basic facilities.

West Heath Library, previously situated near the former Fordrough public house off West Heath Road, was closed by Birmingham City Council in January 2014 despite a vigorous local community-based campaign to fight the closure. More than 110 local residents attended a public protest outside the library building on 12 April 2014 to further the aims of the campaign against closure. At the meeting the local Labour councillor strenuously reassured the campaigners that a local library service would continue but an announcement by Labour-run Birmingham City Council, made in mid-February 2016, revealed that plans for a new building had been withdrawn and that a library may be opened in the future elsewhere. Subsequently, on 9 April 2016, a rally of 50 people including the Member of Parliament for Northfield, the Leader of Birmingham City Council and the three Northfield City Councillors, was held at the site of the old West Heath library to call for a new building to be constructed on this site but nothing came of this. The area is now served by a weekly mobile library service but there is a move to relocate some library facilities to the West Heath Community Centre at Hampstead House. Before moving to the Fordrough, there was a library situated next to St Anne's Church in a prefabricated building on Lilley Lane.

=== Events ===
For many years an annual West Heath Flower And Produce Show was held at the beginning of September. It was originally held at St. Anne's Church Hall but from the 77th Show in 2011 it was located in Hampstead House in Condover Road, West Heath's Community Centre. The holding of the annual Flower And Produce Show has now been discontinued. There is an annual West Heath Art Exhibition held at Hampstead House.

An annual summer fete for the local community is held in June at Hampstead House.

An annual West Heath Beer and Cider festival is held at Hampstead House usually in late September or early October.

The ‘Velo Birmingham 2019’ cycling event passed through West Heath on 13 May 2019 when cyclists rode through the area along Rednal Road, up Lilley Lane, around West Heath green and along Cofton Road and Groveley Lane. The same event was to have taken place in 2020 but was cancelled because of the COVID-19 pandemic.

=== The area ===
There is a green which forms an island around which the roads from Kings Norton to Rednal and Northfield to Alvechurch pass and at the centre of which is a large and old oak tree. The green is planted with bulbs which provide a colourful display in spring. On either side of the green are St. John Fisher church and St. Anne's church as well as a residential home for the elderly and new housing. There is also a very large oak tree situated at the corner of Longbridge Lane and Groveley Lane which has been named "The Cofton Oak" and which was the subject of a campaign to preserve it when it was threatened by plans to have it removed.

Council estates were constructed after 1945, both at West Heath and Turves Green. Both areas feature a large number of terraces and semi-detached houses with some Tower blocks at Fairfax Road which latterly have become known as 'The Poets' Blocks', each being named after a famous British poet (Shakespeare, Wordsworth and Tennyson). The first flats to be built in West Heath were 3 six storey blocks in Turves Green constructed in 1952 by Deeley for the then Birmingham County Borough Council in an Art Deco style. The three blocks, Oxford House, Aylesbury House and Buckingham House, were demolished in 1999.

A high-density private estate was built on the former grounds of West Heath Hospital. Turves Green at one time had nine residential towers, several blocks of low-rise flats, and an estate of pre-fabricated bungalows and brick semi-detached houses, known as the Austin Village, which was built in 1916 to house First World War munitions workers. The Austin Village has been a Conservation area from the early 1990s but in 2019 Birmingham City Council decided to withdraw its special status though it has extended the time allowed for an appeal against this decision in the face of a campaign led by the Austin Village Preservation Society.

West Heath Park is located at the north-east boundary of West Heath with Kings Norton. Amenities include children's recreation facilities and football pitches and nearby is Oddingley Hall, the second of West Heath's Community centres, though this is located in Kings Norton.

Cofton Park, where Pope Benedict XVI attended a service for the beatification of Cardinal John Henry Newman on 19 September 2010, is situated within the boundaries of the Longbridge and West Heath electoral ward. Various public events are held in the park including, annually, the Longbridge Pride event which celebrates the heritage of the Longbridge motor works.

== Governance ==
=== Historical ===
Historically, in the Middle Ages West Heath was part of the upper division of Halfshire Hundred that also contained Bromsgrove, Coston Hackett, Dodderhill, Doverdale, Droitwich, Elmbridge, Feckenham, Hadsor, Hampton Lovett, Kington, Kings Norton, Northfield, Salwarpe, Tardebigge and Upton Warren. However, West Heath was incorporated in the City of Birmingham in 1911 when the Kings Norton and Northfield Urban District Council was abolished.

=== Westminster ===
The area lies in the Birmingham Northfield parliamentary constituency and is represented by Labour MP Laurence Turner, who was elected in July 2024.

=== Birmingham City Council ===
West Heath is represented on Birmingham City Council as part of the Ward of Longbridge and West Heath by two councillors: Charlie Latchford and Anthony Ward, both of Reform UK, and elected in the 2026 local elections.

Prior to May 2018 West Heath, apart from a small part at the southern edge from 2004, was represented on Birmingham City Council by the three Northfield councillors. Previous councillors from 1973 when local government boundaries had been considerably altered include Neil Scrimshaw who died in office to be succeeded by his wife, Margaret Scrimshaw (1984-1996 and 1999-2004), Reg Corns (1973-1994, re-elected 2000-15), Les Lawrence (1982-1995 and 1998-2012), Randal Brew (2004-2018 and previously Councillor for Longbridge, Lord Mayor of Birmingham 2007-8), Debbie Clancy (2015-2026), Ron Storer (2022-2026) and Edwina Currie (1975-1986, later Member of Parliament for South Derbyshire and government minister and mistress of Prime Minister John Major), all of whom had represented the Conservative Party.

As part of the reorganisation of representation on Birmingham council, the Local Government Boundary Commission England released a report in 2015 which proposed West Heath become a ward of the city with a single councillor. The suggested boundaries excluded West Heath village on Alvechurch Road, from the proposed West Heath ward, along with West Heath parish church, West Heath post office, West Heath Community Centre in Hampstead House, the site of the now-closed West Heath library and West Heath medical centre. The village itself and the sites mentioned were all to be placed in a ward titled "Northfield East". It was proposed "Northfield East" be renamed "West Heath North", to reflect the reality that otherwise West Heath's most important sites would not be included in a ward named "West Heath". In response, the Local Government Boundary Commission for England recommended on 10 May 2016 that the new wards be named "West Heath North" and "West Heath South" respectively, but a final submission combined the two with part of Longbridge in a large ward with 2 councillors to be called "Longbridge and West Heath". The new ward stretches from Cofton Park in the south, to West Heath Park in the north and includes West Heath village, Longbridge town centre, the Austin village, Cofton Primary School, Albert Bradbeer School, the Turves Green Schools, West Heath Primary School and St. John Fisher Roman Catholic School along with Bournville College (in Longbridge), St. Anne's Church, St. John Fisher Church and St. John The Baptist Church in Longbridge. The ward includes Longbridge railway station, West Heath Community Centre, West Heath Hospital and notable buildings including the old railway workers cottages along Station Road, the old nailers cottage in Turves Green and The Man On The Moon pub. The ward is the most southerly in Birmingham.

== Geography ==
=== Geology ===
West Heath is built on a well-drained stretch of gravel and sand that had been laid down under a prehistoric shallow sea and enriched by sediments from ice age glaciers. The natural heath land had grown on a flatter area between the nearby Lickey Hills and Redhill. The Lickey Hills area includes a wide geological range of rocks of various ages. The stratigraphic sequence, which is the basis for the area's diversity of landscape and habitat, comprises:

- Barnt Green rocks – Precambrian tuffs and volcanic grits
- Lickey Quartzite – a Cambrian quartzite
- Keele Clay – a Carboniferous clay
- Rubery sandstone – a fossiliferous sandstone of lower Silurian age
- Clent Breccia – a Permian breccia
- Bunter Pebble Beds – beds of Triassic water-worn pebbles

The subsoil layers under West Heath and Turves Green also contain a coal seam that would indicate that a prehistoric tropical forest once existed here.

=== Waterways ===
The River Rea runs through West Heath on its way from its source to the North Sea. The river rises in Waseley Hills Country Park and after dropping 70 metres in the first mile passes through West Heath and onwards to Kings Norton, Selly Oak and Digbeth in the centre of Birmingham. Near Gravelly Hill Interchange, about 14 miles from its source, the Rea becomes a tributary of the River Tame and its waters eventually discharge into the North Sea via later connections with the River Trent and eventually the Humber Estuary.

Although now often reduced to a sluggish trickle, due to changes in agricultural usage and other demands, the River Rea was once a major waterway and served several working mills in West Heath and provided water for the skating rink and open air lido (now both demolished).

=== Roads ===
The A441 Redditch Road, which runs between Birmingham and Redditch, passes to the East, and the A38 Bristol Road South, which runs between Birmingham and Worcester and eventually Cornwall, passes to the West. The M42 and M5 Motorways are also close, providing national connections.

== Demography ==
As part of the Northfield ward there are no separate demographic figures for West Heath.

In the 2011 UK census the total population of the Northfield constituency was about 101,400 living in approximately 43,000 households (in the 2001 census, approximately 25,000 people were resident in the Northfield ward, the population density being about 45 persons per hectare compared with an average of around 36.5 for Birmingham as a whole). In 2001 Northfield ward had an approximate average age of 39 compared with 36 for the city as a whole. The total population of Northfield constituency had increased by 3.5% between 2001 and 2011. In 2011, 15.1% of the population of Northfield constituency was aged 65 years and over compared with 12.9% for Birmingham as a whole.

In 2011, the White ethnic group accounted for 85.8% of the population (in 2001, 94% of all residents were White). In 2011, 4.2% of the population was recorded as being Asian in origin while in 2001, 1.5% were recorded as being of Asian Pakistani origin. Around 4.4% of the population was recorded as Black in 2011 (1.5% in 2001). The 2011 Census recorded that 8.5% of the population of Northfield had been born overseas compared with figures of 22.2% for Birmingham and 13.8% for England. In 2011, 1.8% of the population of Northfield did not speak English as their first language compared with 7.5% for the whole of Birmingham.

In 2011, 60.7% of the population of Northfield (compared with 46.1% of the population of Birmingham) recorded that they were Christians, 28.5% recorded that they adhered to no religion (19.3% of Birmingham population), 6.8% did not state their religion (6.5%) and 2.3% described themselves as Muslims (21.8% of Birmingham population).

In 2011, 67.7% of the population of Northfield were economically active compared with 64.2% of the population of Birmingham while the unemployment rate in Northfield was 6.2% compared with 9.4% for Birmingham as a whole.

== Economy ==
The early 1970s were difficult times for many of the West Heath inhabitants who worked at the motor works in Longbridge because of the severe industrial unrest which prevailed then with its accompanying "wildcat" strikes. Derek Robinson – "Red Robbo" – at one time lived in Alvechurch Road and he was generally seen as one of the principal leaders of the industrial action that was frequently taken against the management of the company that was then known as British Leyland. With so many local people working at the motor works at the time the factory was of great economic importance to West Heath and there was even a pub on Longbridge Lane which was called "The Jolly Fitter" which depicted a happy-looking motor worker on its pub sign.

Since the closure of the Longbridge motor works there is little in the way of major industry in the area and West Heath serves as a dormitory area for central Birmingham.

There is a small industrial estate in Lightning Way off Alvechurch Road including a company which manufactures glass products, a local speciality.

== Landmarks ==
- Man on the Moon Public House – This public house was built in 1937 and its name was changed from The Man In The Moon to its present name after the first crewed lunar landing.

== Education ==
- West Heath Primary School
- West Heath Junior School
- Cofton Junior and Infant
- Albert Bradbeer Junior and Infant
- St John Fisher Catholic Primary School.
- Turves Green Boys' School
- King Edward VI Northfield School for Girls

== Religious sites ==
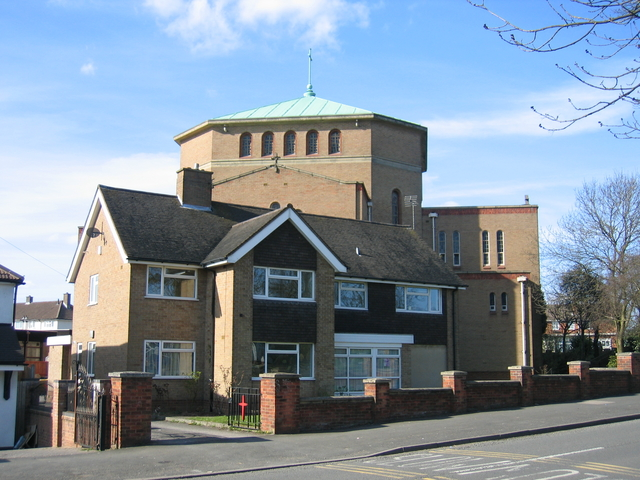
St John Fisher Church

- St John Fisher Catholic Church – The large influx of Irish people in the 1950s led to the establishment of the Catholic parish of St. John Fisher on 30 September 1956 with first masses being held by Father Philip Smith at Turves Green Girls School and afterwards at Archbishop Masterson Girls' School. Father Philip Smith cut the first turf on the land for a new church on 5 March 1962 and Archbishop Grimshaw laid the foundation stone on 25 June 1962 with the church being opened on 31 March 1964 and consecrated on 22 June 1972, the feast of St. John Fisher. The building was designed by the architect E. Bower Norris. Until it sustained damage and was removed in 2008 there was a large wooden sculpture of St. John Fisher dressed as Bishop of Rochester, sculpted by Jonah Jones (1919–2004), attached to the front of the church but it has now been replaced by the pattern of a cross in brick. The large Catholic population in West Heath amounts to about 900 families living in the area in 2010.
- St Anne's Church – The Anglican Parish of St. Anne covers a geographically small area with St. Anne's Church at the centre, the building consisting of the old church, called "The Mission Church" until 1942, which was built in 1900 and opened by the Bishop of Worcester on 1 December 1900 and now used as the church hall, and the new church. Work on the building of the new church began in 1968 with the consecration of St Anne's Church and St Francis’ Chapel taking place on 4 October 1974, St Francis’ Day. West Heath became the Benefice of West Heath in the Deanery of Kings Norton in 1966. The architects of the new church were Harvey and Wicks.
- St Nicholas Church – Prior to the building of St. Anne's, the medieval church of St. Nicholas in Kings Norton, had served West Heath as the parish church. Cofton Common lay within the parish of St. Michael's Church at Cofton Hackett.

== Sports clubs and recreation ==
- West Heath Football Club, West Heath Park – founded 2014 - Leisure Leagues Rubery Division 1
- West Heath Snooker Club, Unit 8 Lightning Way
- West Heath Community Centre, Condover Road

== Transport ==
=== Buses ===
The suburb is served by buses operated by National Express West Midlands routes 45, 48 and 49 connecting Birmingham, Solihull and West Bromwich.

=== Rail ===
Northfield railway station on the Cross-City Line is located at the north end of West Heath, with trains operating to Redditch, Bromsgrove, Birmingham & Lichfield at a 10 to 20 minute frequency during peak times. Longbridge railway station is located inside the Longbridge and West Heath ward close to Longbridge town centre and the Austin Village.

== Notable people ==
- Mike Skinner – the musician aka The Streets lived in and was raised in West Heath.
- Freddie Farrell – Comic. Lived in and was raised in West Heath.
- Ian Lavender – actor of Dad's Army fame (Private Frank Pike) lived in Harpers Road in West Heath. In the TV show he wore the claret and blue scarf depicting a loyalty to his real life favourite local football team Aston Villa).
- Dame Barbara Cartland – it is sometimes stated that the romantic novelist who had been born in Augustus Road, Edgbaston, lived in West Heath but no published evidence is available to support this belief. It is possible that her family moved to West Heath, less affluent than Edgbaston, temporarily after her grandfather's suicide in 1903 which followed his bankruptcy and the family's consequent loss of wealth.
- Reverend Wilbert Vere Awdry – creator of "Thomas the Tank Engine", was curate at St. Anne's West Heath from 1940 to 1946. It was during this period of his life that Awdry first told a railway story to his son Christopher in 1943 and published his first railway story, "The Three Railway Engines", in 1945. Awdry also held services at the Epiphany Church in the Austin Village.
- Bruce Chatwin – as a young child during World War II, the novelist and travel writer often lived for periods in West Heath at the home of his widowed paternal grandmother, Isobel Chatwin, who lived at 198 West Heath Road. His uncle sometimes took him to sail boats he had built at nearby Barnt Green Reservoir. Chatwin's mother Margharita had worked as an assistant to Ronald Cartland, Barbara Cartland's brother, who was Member of Parliament for Kings Norton. In the 1950s, 198 West Heath Road became the home of the local medical general practitioner, Dr. Anthony Bobak, but despite the significance of the building, the house was demolished in 2007 and replaced by a block of apartments.
- The Rockin' Berries – the chart-topping band from the 1960s first formed while members were pupils at Turves Green Boys School.
- David Claridge – born in 1953, lived in Coney Green Drive in the Austin Village as a young child and was a pupil at Turves Green Infants' School, before moving to a private school, Greenmore College. As an adult he created the character of "Roland Rat", a puppet which first appeared on the British breakfast television programme, TVam, in April 1983 and went on to save the station from closure. Many series were made for the BBC, Channel 5, Channel 4 and ITV. Roland continues to make guest appearances on British television from time to time, although Claridge now lives in California.
- Lewis Goodall - as a boy lived in Longbridge and attended Turves Green Boys School from whence he went to St. John's College, University of Oxford graduating in 2010 with a degree in History and politics. Now an author and journalist and a former editor of the Newsnight current affairs programme on BBC television.

== See also ==
- Northfield, Birmingham
- Cofton Hackett
