= Northfield, Birmingham =

Area of Birmingham, England

Coordinates: 52.408°N 1.963°W

Northfield
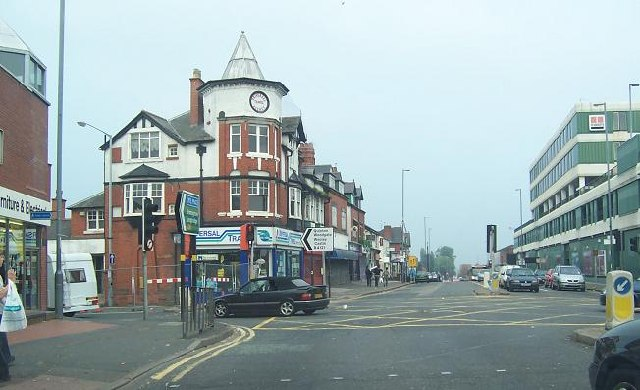
- View of Bristol Road South at Northfield looking north towards Selly Oak

- Location within the West Midlands
- Population: 10,404 (2021 people Ward)
  - Density: 4,470/km^{2}
- OS grid reference: SP025795
- Metropolitan borough: Birmingham
- Metropolitan county: West Midlands
- Region: West Midlands
- Country: England
- Sovereign state: United Kingdom
- Post town: BIRMINGHAM
- Postcode district: B31
- Dialling code: 0121
- Police: West Midlands
- Fire: West Midlands
- Ambulance: West Midlands
- UK Parliament: Birmingham Northfield

Northfield is a residential area in outer south Birmingham, in the county of the West Midlands, England, near the boundary with Worcestershire, which it was historically within. It is also a council constituency, managed by its own district committee. The constituency includes the wards of Kings Norton, Longbridge, Weoley Castle and the smaller ward of Northfield that includes West Heath and Turves Green.

Mentioned in the Domesday Book and formerly a small village, then included in north Worcestershire, Northfield became part of Birmingham in 1911 after it had been rapidly expanded and developed in the period prior to World War I. The northern reaches of Northfield fall within the Bournville model village and the southern housing estates were originally built by Austin Motors for their workforce.

A centre of the Midlands nail making industry during the 19th century and home to both the Kalamazoo paper factory and the Austin motor company's Longbridge factory in the 20th century, today Northfield is predominantly a residential and dormitory suburb of metropolitan Birmingham. Northfield stands on either side of the main A38, heading south from the centre of Birmingham to Bromsgrove and onwards all the way to Cornwall.

== History ==
=== Pre-history ===
Northfield was occupied or visited in the Stone Age as evidenced by a yellow Chert neolithic scraper discovered in Quarry Lane and a stone axe-head found on Tessall Lane, dated to the New Stone Age. It is also possible that Northfield was occupied in the Bronze Age as large burnt mounds of heat-shattered stones have been identified alongside Northfield's streams evidencing occupation of the area over a lengthy period of time. One of these mounds found near Merritts Brook Lane is 16 metres across. Two further mounds, one on Griffin's Brook near Woodlands Park Road and another at the foot of Bell Hill, were radiocarbon-dated to c. 1070 BCE and c. 1120 BCE respectively. The usage evidence is not totally conclusive, but the hot stones are believed to have either provided heating for domestic cooking or Bronze Age saunas.

=== Roman, Saxon and Norman periods ===
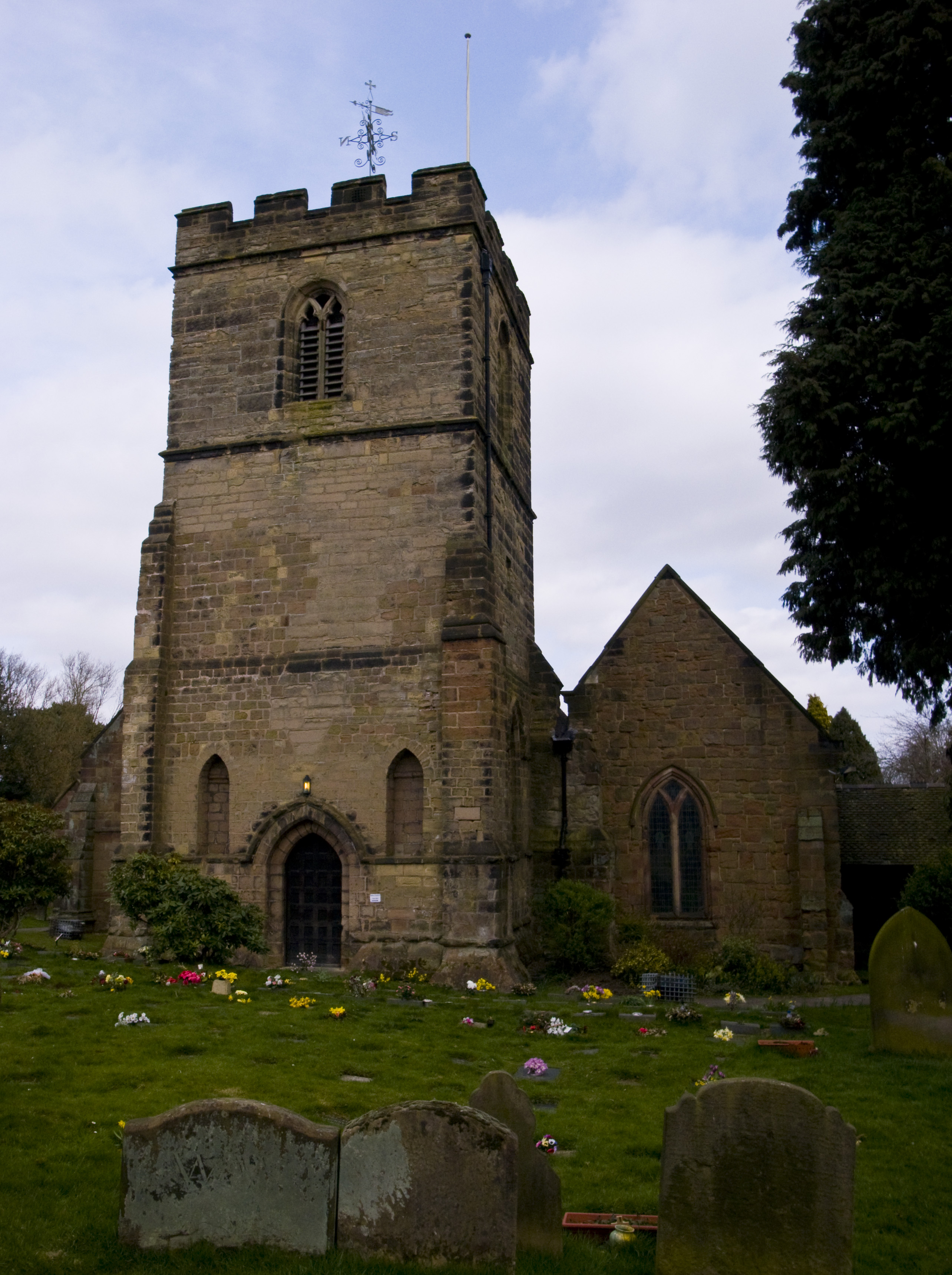
St. Laurence's Church, Northfield

Before Roman times the area round Northfield most likely belonged to the Celtic tribe, Dobunii, there is little evidence of Saxon settlement and the area was probably mainly Celtic. The name was original nord feld, an Anglo-Saxon phrase and Northfield was probably named because the area is to the north of Bromsgrove. Northfield was also near the northern edge of the Saxon kingdom called Hwicce as were Kings Norton and Yardley and was near the northern edge of the area settled by Saxons arriving from the south.

What is now the route of the Bristol Road South through Northfield had become known as the Upper Saltway (part of the historic Ryknild Street), because it was one of the routes used to transport salt extracted from the Droitwich brine springs all the way to Saltfleet on the Lincolnshire coast. The salt was then loaded onto ships and exported to France and Scandinavia for trading purposes.

The Romans also used the road that became the Upper Saltway as a frequent route between settlements and marching forts. Roman occupation evidence was discovered by chance near the Bristol Road South in Northfield when Pigeon House near Hill Top Road was demolished in c1921 (as the Bristol Road was being widened) and the Northfield hoard of 16 Roman coins was found buried. The trove included coins of Claudius II Gothicus (268–270 CE), Diocletian (284–305 CE), Maximian (285–286 CE), Constantius (305–306 CE), Constantine (306–337 CE) . The excavation also revealed a Roman aqueduct that indicated a Romano-British building of some status had once stood on the site. In 1963 a Roman coin was found in nearby Rednal by a Janet and Stephen Harris. The coin was a dupondius struck during the reign of the Roman Emperor Antoninus Pius who ruled Rome and Britain from 138 to 161 AD. The tiny coin was struck from brass and would have been worth about the price of a loaf of bread.

Northfield was in a Saxon settlement or a Celtic area that Saxons had conquered in North Worcestershire, which in 1086 became part of the lands of William Fitz-Ansculf, a Norman knight. The village Nordfeld is described in the Domesday Book as having a priest as well as seven villeins, sixteen bordars, six cottars, who shared enough land for thirteen ploughs, two serfs and a bondswoman (a slave). St. Laurence's Church, Northfield dates from the 12th century, nearby is the Great Stone Inn with a medieval timber framed hall and the 17th Century village pound where stray animals were kept; the large rock in the pound, a glacial "erratic" (see Geology below), was formerly in the road at the corner of the inn, and was used as a mounting-block by horse-riders; it was removed in the interests of road safety in the 1950s. The area round the church, the inn and the pound are a conservation area because of their historic importance. A local joke describes Northfield as "where they sell beer by the Stone and ale by the Pound".

=== Civil War period ===
During the English Civil War Northfield stood on the northern border of royalist Worcestershire and right next to parliamentary Warwickshire and there were regular minor skirmishes and conflicts between the forces of the two opposing sides. Hawkesley House in West Heath, which belonged to the royalist Middlemore family, was besieged and seized by parliamentary forces who fortified the building but were re-expelled subsequently by royalist forces in May 1645 and the house was then razed to the ground. Prince Rupert of the Rhine, commander of the Royalist cavalry, lived in Longbridge House and used it as his headquarters throughout the siege of Hawkesley House. Hawksley House is now an archaeological site.

There are traditions that Henry Tudor, Earl of Richmond, slept in Selly Manor on his way to the Battle of Bosworth Field. Later Robert Catesby, of the Gunpowder Plot fame, and Oliver Cromwell are both said to have also visited Northfield and also stayed at Selly Manor House.

=== 19th century ===
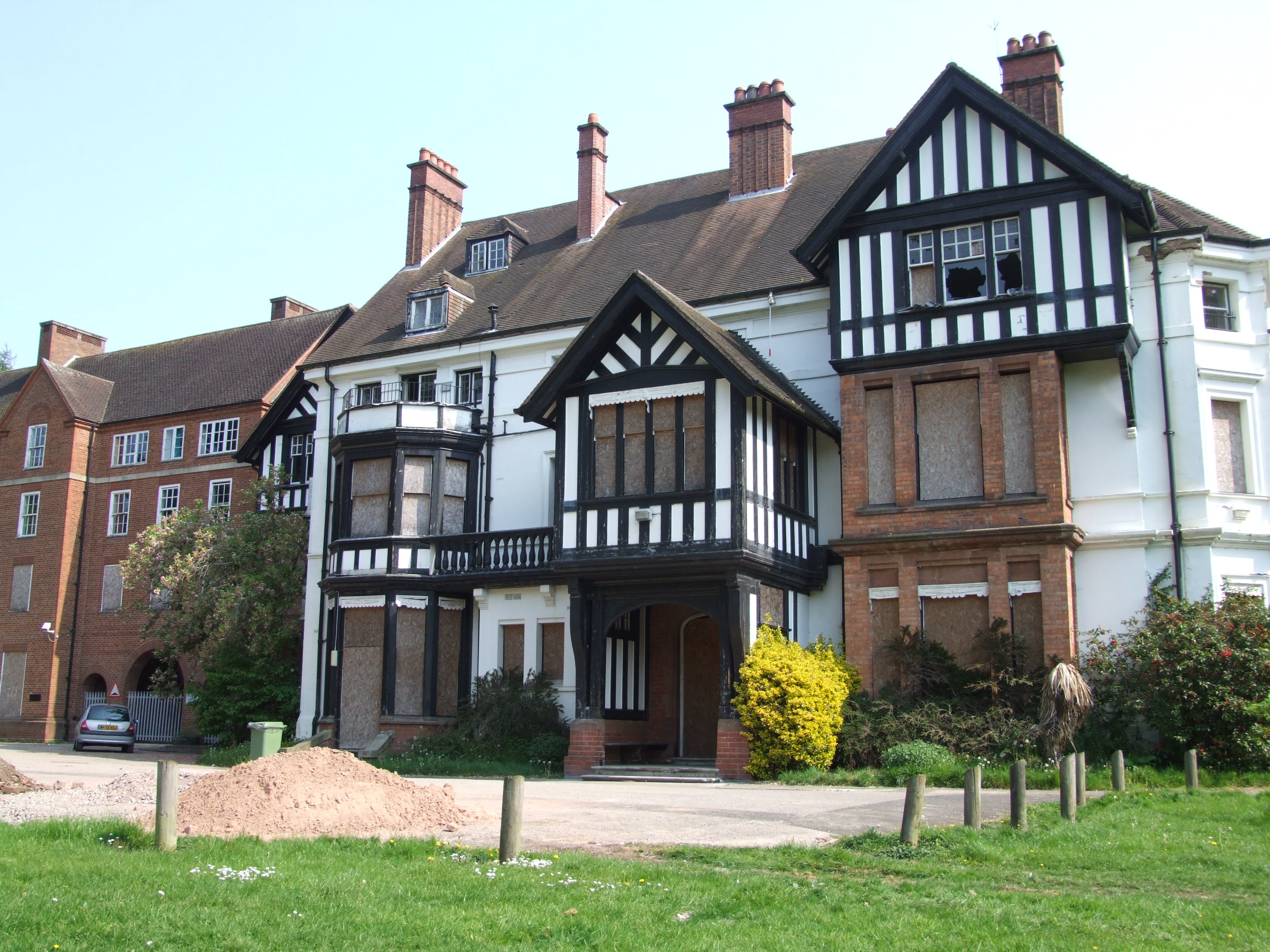
Northfield Manor House – former home of George Cadbury and now owned by Birmingham University

Throughout the early part of the 19th century Northfield was known for its nail making industry based in cottages and small workshops next to the Church. Within the ward in 1831 there were 122 men recorded as being employed in the industry. However the industry was already in decline – in 1841 there were 74 nailers and in 1884 there were only 23 with seven of those in West Heath. Nailer's workshops had been present in Northfield, Groveley, West Heath and Turves Green. By the start of the 20th century nailing had moved to central Birmingham factories, ceasing to be a cottage industry. Also nearby were a number of grain mills on the banks of the River Rea, where locally grown corn and wheat was ground.

Northfield was on the main road between Birmingham and Worcester. In 1762 this route was turnpiked and the Northfield tollgate was on the site of the modern-day corner of Rochester Road. Today the original turnpike is known as the Bristol Road South. The 'Bell and Bluebell Inn' at the junction of Bell Lane and Bell Holloway was a coaching station for travellers until a new 'Bell Inn' was built on the Bristol Road in 1803. There was a small separate hamlet on Bell Lane where several late 18th-century and early 19th-century cottages still survive. From 1766 a cross-country route was also turnpiked from Northfield to Wootton Wawen, Henley-in-Arden.

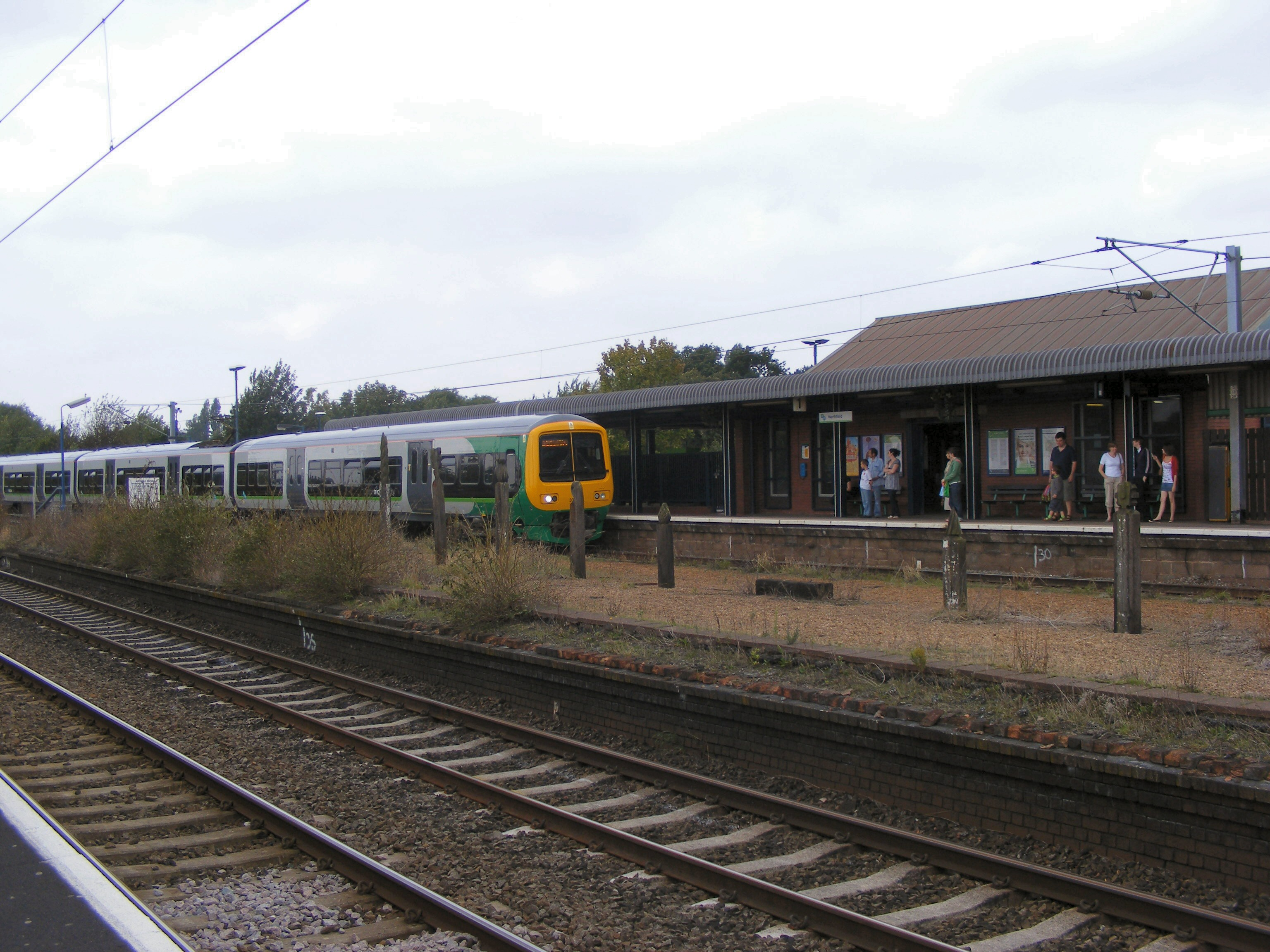
Northfield railway station – opened in 1870

In 1868 N E S A Hamilton's The National Gazetteer of Great Britain and Ireland described the parish as follows:

Northfield, a parish in the upper division of the hundred of Halfshire, county Worcester, 6 miles South-West. of Birmingham, its post town, and 2 West of the King's Norton station on the Gloucester railway. It is situated on the small river Rea, and on the road from Birmingham to Worcester.

The parish contains the hamlets of Selly, Hay, Shendley, and Bartley. A portion of the inhabitants are employed in nail making. There are chemical works and freestone quarries. The surface is flat towards the East, but hilly in the West. The soil is a fertile loam, producing good crops of wheat and beans.

In 1870 Northfield railway station was opened providing new business opportunities. Charles Pegram, a local industrialist built houses for railway workers, also a roller skating rink and a temperance hotel all near the station.

=== 20th century ===
Victoria Common was laid out and landscaped on the site of the former public common land called Bradley's Field by Birmingham City Council as a municipal recreation area to mark Queen Victoria's Diamond Jubilee in 1897, was never completed and reopened to the public until 1901. The park has changed little since it was first opened (though trees have grown and matured), excepting the additions of several tennis courts laid in the 1930s and a children's play area built in the 1950s and renewed since. A tributary of Griffin's Brook ran through the park but was piped underground as far as St Lawrence Road during landscaping. The original grand entrance gates, park-keeper's residential lodge, gardeners' workshops and nursery greenhouse all stood on the Bristol Road South where the Northfield Shopping Centre precinct now stands.

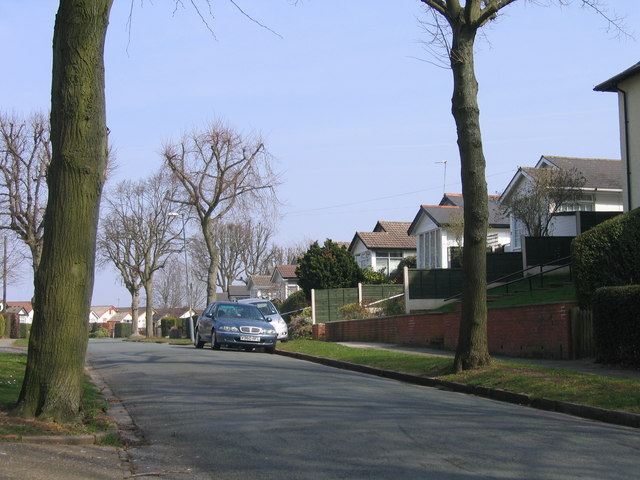
Austin estate housing

During the first decade of the 20th century Austin Motor Works and Kalamazoo both entered the area, providing plentiful and well paid employment for Northfield residents.

In 1900 visitors arriving via Northfield railway station could visit the skating rink on West Heath Road next to the bridge over the River Rea. Unfortunately the skating rink was used during the First World War as a munitions factory and following an accident the rink was destroyed by fire. Another notable building of the area was The Bath Tub open air lido (now demolished), opened on 1 July 1937 in Alvechurch Road, where 20,000 people had gathered to watch the opening ceremony by Gracie Fields with Mantovani and his orchestra and the M.P. for Northfield and Kings Norton, Ronald Cartland, the brother of Dame Barbara Cartland, the novelist. The lido which had been built by Percy Hollier, who intended it to be "Birmingham's brightest entertainment spot" and which included a 180-foot-by-90-foot swimming pool as well as a putting green, lawn for archery and a children's playground, only operated for three years and was closed due to commercial failure. Laughtons took over the site with Eddystone Radio during World War II, when its semi-rural location helped it to avoid attack by German air raids. The lido site is now covered by a housing estate.

Northfield Library serves the area. It was opened in 1906, but was destroyed by fire in 1914 in a suspected arson attack by the Suffragettes. It was rebuilt in the same year by the Free Libraries Committee. The façade remains the same; however, in 1984, the library building was doubled in size to accommodate more books. The library celebrated its centenary in 2006. West Heath library also serves the area.

As recently as 1900 Northfield was still a village within the rural north Worcestershire countryside. The residential Austin Village was built during World War I to house factory workers. Later a succession of private and council housing developments had completely swallowed Northfield up into the City of Birmingham. The extensive housebuilding continued before and after World War II through extensions to the Bournville Model Village and several estates of temporary Prefab housing in West Heath, although new house provision has slowed down to a much less dramatic rate since the 1970s.

In 1911 the civil parish had a population of 31,395. On 9 November 1912 the parish was abolished and merged with Birmingham.

By 1900 a large mansion on the Bristol Road South near St Lawrence Road called Gainsborough House, originally built in the 17th century, was renamed The Priory and became home to the Convent of our Lady of Charity housing up to twenty nuns and girls. The grounds of the Priory nearly reached Heath Road South and included a circuitous woodland walk and a large lake. Demolished in the 1990s the Priory and its grounds are now covered by a modern housing estate and an extension to the Royal Orthopedic Hospital.

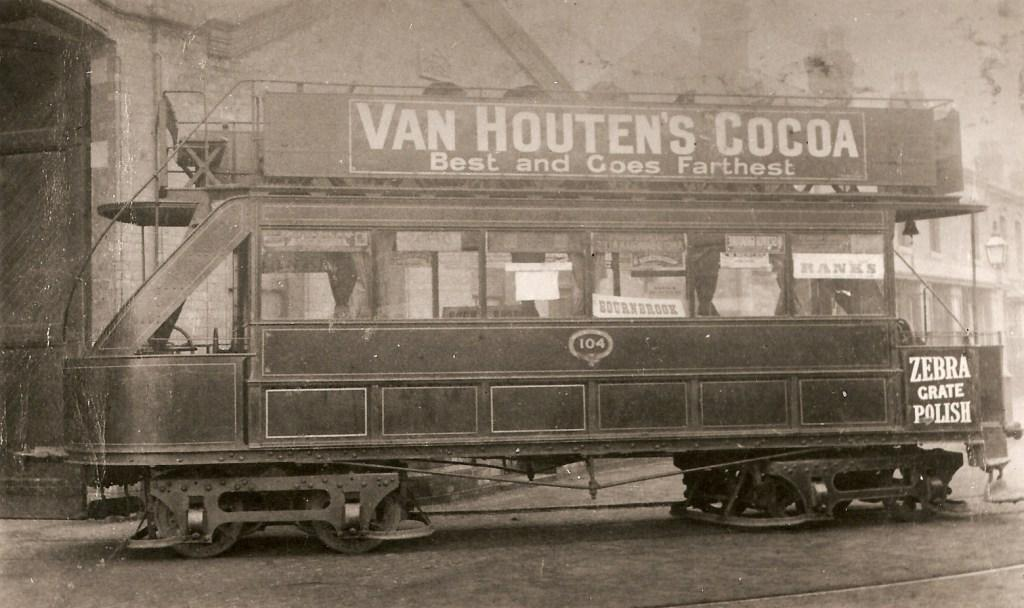
Birmingham electric tramcar

Birmingham Corporation Tramways operated a network of electric trams in Birmingham between 1904 until 1953. It was the largest narrow-gauge tramway network in the UK, built to a gauge of 3 ft 6 inches and the fourth largest tramway network in the UK after London, Glasgow and Manchester. The tram-tracks ran in both directions along the central grassed reservation of the Bristol Road South but also ran right through the centre of Northfield, with cars and commercial vehicles having to give way to the trams on the rails set into the road. Both routes that ran through Northfield, Route 70 (Navigation Street to Rednal) and Route 71 (Navigation Street to Rubery) were closed down on 5 July 1952. Eventually, over a number of years, the rails were covered by tarmac during several road -repair schemes during the 1950s and 1960s.

A major housing development in Northfield was the Egghill Estate in the west of the district. It was built by the city council during the 1950s and 1960s, with hundreds of properties being built. There were several multi-storey blocks of flats as well as lower blocks of flats and a shopping centre among the concentration of low-rise housing. By the 1980s, however, the estate was plagued by crime and the declining quality of the housing stock. In 2000, the city council decided to demolish the entire estate to make way for a new housing development. A decade on, however, the redevelopment is far from complete. Some of the old houses remain, while only a small number of new housing association properties have been built, and the bulk of the estate remains derelict and undeveloped. When the redevelopment is finally completed, it is expected that the new Egghill Estate will include improved shopping and community facilities.

There are many pre-war and post war council houses, maisonettes, flats and tower blocks in Northfield Constituency.

== Governance ==
=== Historical ===
During the Middle Ages Northfield formed part of the Halfshire Hundred in the county of Worcestershire.

=== Westminster ===
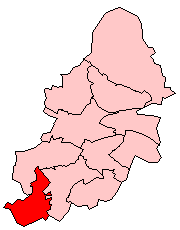
Northfield constituency shown within Birmingham

Birmingham Northfield is a parliamentary constituency. Its Member of Parliament (MP) is Laurence Turner of the Labour Party who was elected on 5 July 2024.

=== District council ===
The councillor elected to represent the Northfield ward on Birmingham City Council is George Hall of Reform UK.

== Geography ==
=== Geology ===
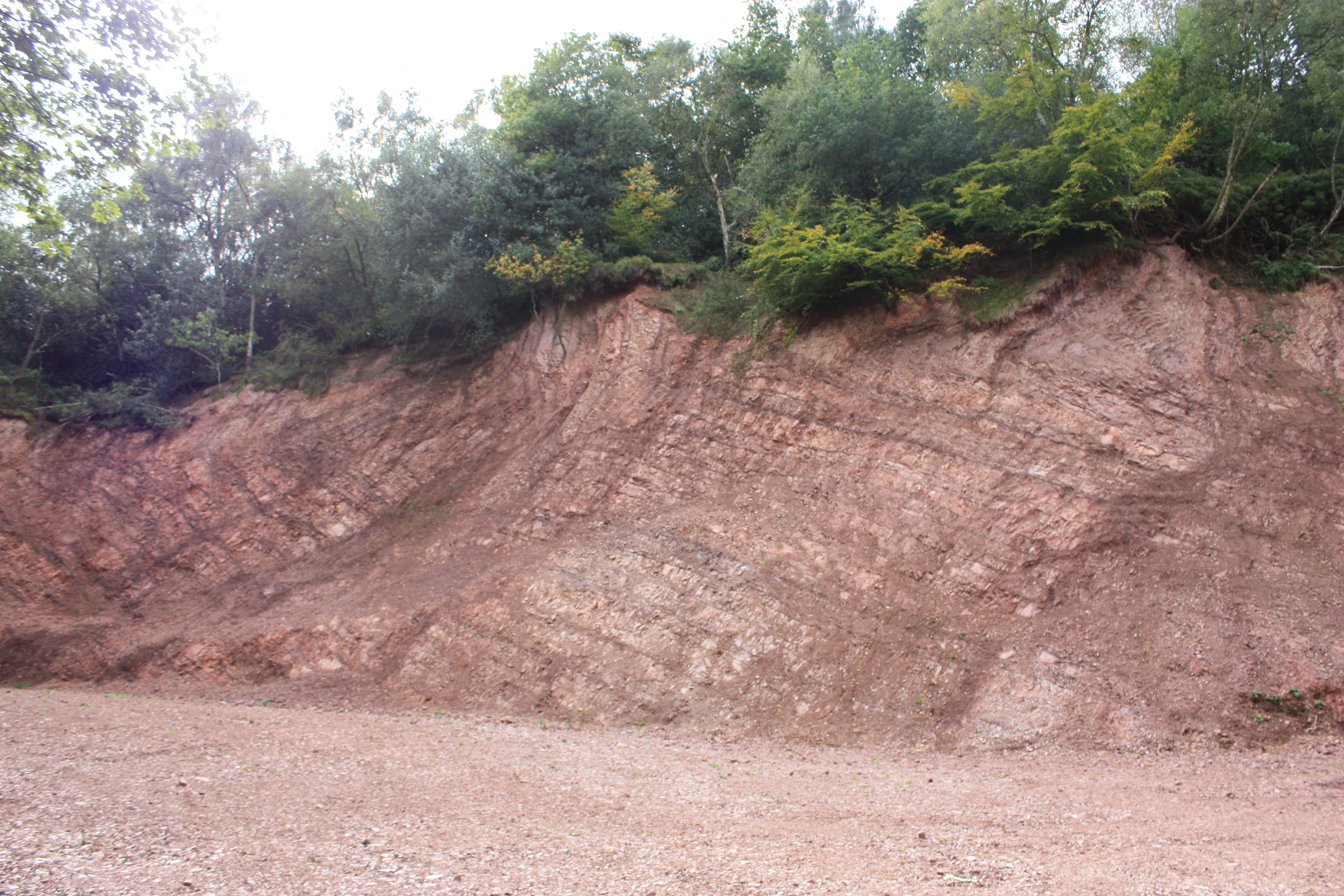
A quarry cutting on Bilberry Hill showing the layers of Lickey Quartzite.

Northfield is built on a well-drained stretch of gravel and sand that had been laid down under a prehistoric shallow sea and enriched by sediments from ice age glaciers. The natural heath land had grown on a flatter area between the nearby Lickey Hills and Redhill. The Northfield area includes a wide geological range of rocks of various ages. The stratigraphic sequence, which is the basis for the area's diversity of landscape and habitat, comprises:

- Barnt Green rocks – Precambrian tuffs and volcanic grits
- Lickey Quartzite – a Cambrian quartzite
- Rubery sandstone – a fossiliferous sandstone of lower Silurian age
- Keele Clay – a Carboniferous clay
- Clent Breccia – a Permian breccia that consists of angular fragments mostly of volcanic rock embedded in a sandy matrix of the same general composition. Clent breccia is the most common sandstone under central Northfield.
- Bunter Pebble Beds – beds of Triassic water-worn pebbles
- Keuper marl – a late Triassic sandstone. Deep wells, sunk through the Keuper formation into the Bunter sandstones below were used to supply the whole of Birmingham with drinking water before the Elan Valley scheme was carried through. Examples of such wells occurred in Northfield, Selly Oak and at Longbridge.

Northfield stands on a small part of the Northfield—Dudley plateau, which constitutes part of the South Staffordshire Uplands and was covered by a massive glacier that stretched all the way from Wales during the last ice age approximately 10,000 – 13,000 years ago. The evidence for this lies in the occurrence of numerous Erratic boulders or far-travelled ice-borne stones, some of which are of immense size, as well as the vast deposits of glacial sands and gravels in the district. The composition of many of these boulders shows that they originated from as far away as Scotland or Snowdonia in Wales, such as the massive boulder discovered while Rowheath playing fields were laid out. Another large boulder is the one after which the Great Stone Inn is named. This glacial erratic from North Wales stood for ten thousand years at the corner of Church Hill and Church Road until it was moved several metres into the adjacent pound during the 1950s. Others indicate a more local origin, such as the Wrekin district in Shropshire. The subsoil layers under Northfield, West Heath and Turves Green also contains a coal seam that would indicate that an extensive prehistoric tropical forest once existed here.

=== Waterways ===
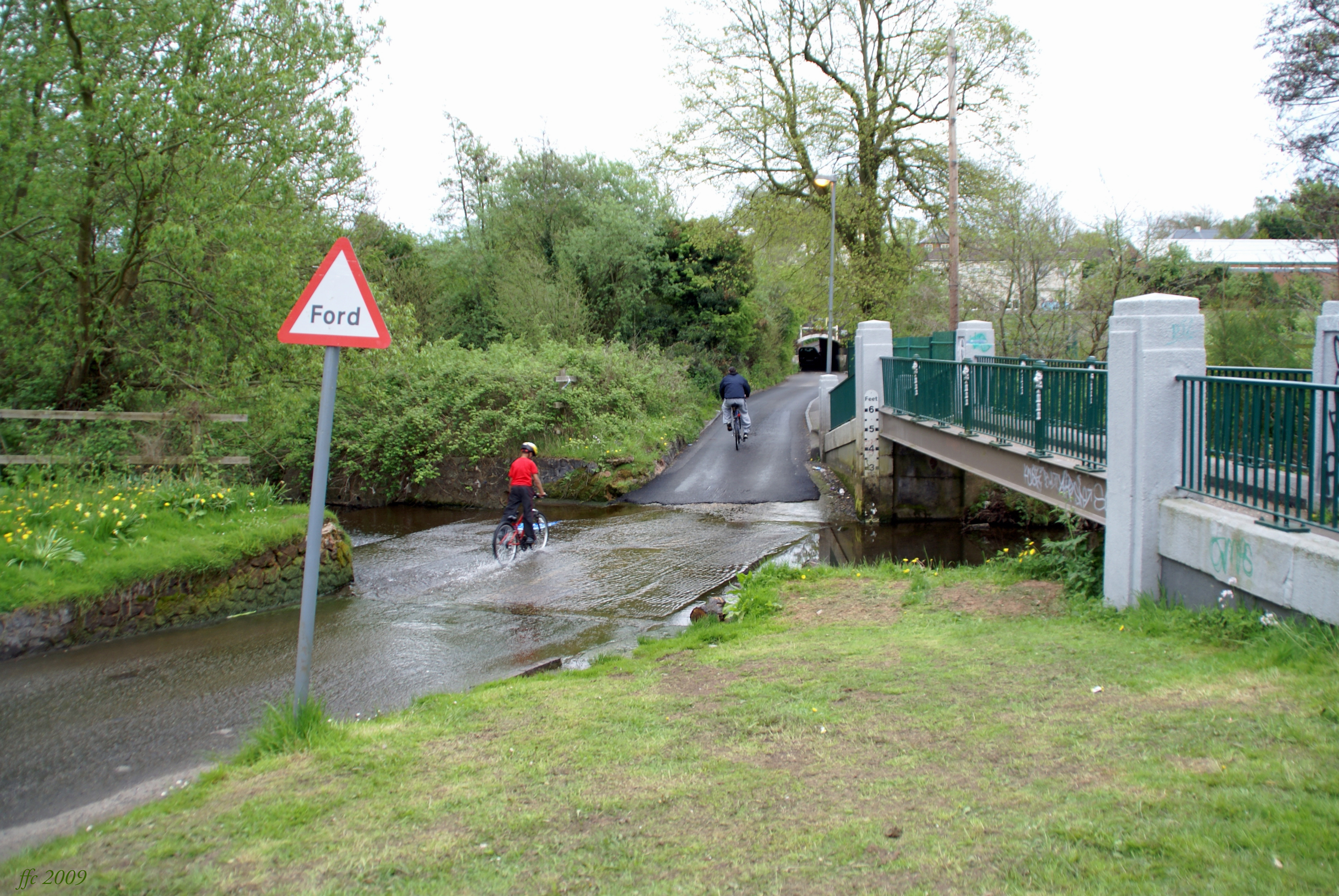
Ford over the River Rea at Mill Walk

The River Rea runs through Northfield on its way from its source to the North Sea. The river rises in Waseley Hills Country Park and after dropping 70 metres (230 ft) in the first mile passes through Northfield, West Heath and onwards to Kings Norton, Selly Oak and Digbeth in the centre of Birmingham. Near Gravelly Hill Interchange, about 14 miles (23 km) from its source, the Rea becomes a tributary of the River Tame and its waters eventually discharge into the North Sea via later connections with the River Trent and eventually the Humber Estuary. Although now culverted for much of its route through Birmingham and often reduced to a sluggish trickle, due to changes in agricultural usage and other demands, the River Rea was once a major waterway and served several working mills in West Heath and provided water for the skating rink and open air lido (now both demolished).

A tributary of Griffin's Brook flows through Northfield's Victoria Common and parallel to Heath Road South on its way to Bournville although it is piped underground now for most of its route since the 1970s, surfacing only briefly to feed the pond near Hole Farm Road, then in Woodlands Park and next near the Valley Pool boating lake, after which it joins up with Griffin's Brook proper which is then renamed the Bourn Brook until it flows into the River Rea. In the 18th century Griffin's Brook was prone to flooding and in the summer of 1786 was reported as being "eight times swollen to such a degree as to interrupt or greatly incommode carriages and passengers on the Bristol Road."

Merritt's Brook rises as springs in fields to the south-west of Northfield, crossing Bell Holloway and flowing parallel to the Bristol Road South until it flows into the lake at Manor Farm. From there the brook flows into Griffin's Brook just west of the A38 near Griffin's Brook Lane.

=== Roads ===
The A38 Bristol Road South, which runs between Birmingham and Worcester and eventually Cornwall, passes to the west. The M42 and M5 Motorways are also close, providing national connections.

== Industry ==
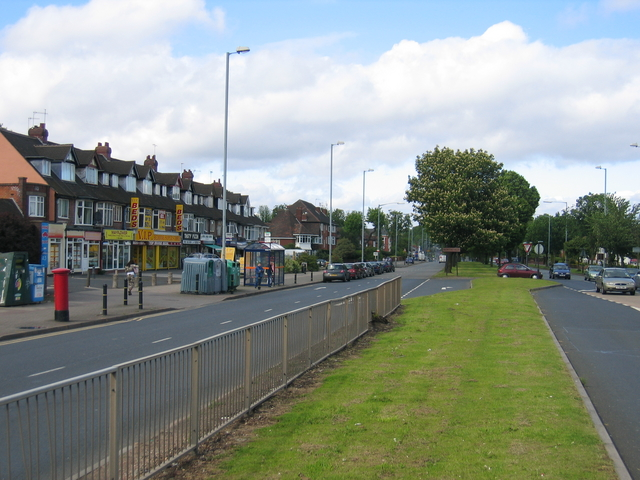
Bristol Road South at Longbridge, looking north towards Northfield

Northfield is perhaps most famous for the Longbridge plant, the Austin Rover car factory located in the Longbridge Ward. This factory was built in 1905 making Austin cars, and gradually expanded over the next 70 years to build higher volumes of vehicles by successive carmaking combines including BMC, British Leyland, Austin Rover, Rover Group and most recently MG Rover. In April 2005 MG Rover went into administration with the loss of more than 6,500 jobs. The company assets were bought by Chinese carmaker Nanjing Automobile three months later, and low volume production began in May 2007 with just over 200 workers employed at the factory making MG TF sports cars. However, the majority of the factory site was demolished, with plans to regenerate the area with a new town centre for Longbridge, new shops, parks and homes, which it is claimed will help with the unemployment suffered by the former workers of the Rover factory. Other developments are a park and ride for the station, with some buildings owned by Network West Midlands demolished to make way for it.

In 1913 Oliver Morland and local Quaker businessman F Paul Impey moved their Kalamazoo paper factory from central Birmingham to an extensive site near the Bristol Road South between Northfield and Longbridge. The factory developed as a major supplier of business stationery and computer multi-part forms, employing predominantly female factory workers, until it closed in the 1980s. Kalamazoo moved into the IT industry, specialising in ERP systems for automotive dealerships, with their headquarters located nearby. In 2001 an American firm, UCS acquired Kalamazoo Computer Group PLC and the business was re-branded as Kalamazoo Ltd until 2003 where it was renamed Kalamazoo-UCS Ltd. After the 2006 UCS merger of Reynolds and Reynolds, the UK company was renamed Kalamazoo-Reynolds Ltd. In November 2012 Kalamazoo-Reynolds rebranded to Reynolds and Reynolds Ltd. Reynolds and Reynolds UK still operate at the site in Northfield today.

== Demography ==
The 2001 Population Census recorded that 23,042 people were living in the ward with a population density of 4,417 people per km^{2} compared with 3,649 people per km^{2} for Birmingham. The percentage of the population represented by ethnic minorities is low in comparison to other wards with a figure of 4.9% (1,130) as opposed to 29.6% for Birmingham in general.

The 2021 Population Census recorded that 10,404 people were living in the ward with a population density of 4,470 people per km^{2}. The percentage of the population represented by ethnic minorities is low in comparison to other wards with a figure of 16.4% (1,711) as opposed to 51.3% for Birmingham in general. The largest religious group was Christianity at 56.5% (5,549).

== Education ==
=== Secondary ===
Some secondary age school children from Northfield attend Turves Green Boys' School or King Edward VI Northfield School for Girls, both on Turves Green. However, with Northfield falling within the various catchment areas for several secondary schools others choose to travel to:

- Colmers School and Sixth Form College, located in Rednal
- Kings Norton Boys School – a boys' foundation secondary school, sixth form centre and Science College for around 750 pupils aged 11 to 18, located on Northfield Road in Kings Norton
- Kings Norton Girls School – Kings Norton Girls School is a girls' foundation secondary school, sixth form centre and Language College for pupils aged 11 to 19. It is located in Selly Oak Road in Kings Norton.
- Bournville School – Bournville School and sixth form centre is a coeducational, state comprehensive school, with Specialist Business and Enterprise College and Music College status, for students aged 11–19 years, located on Griffins Brook Lane, Bournville.
- Shenley Academy – a coeducational secondary school, sixth form centre and Science and Performing Arts College for students aged 11–19 years, located on Shenley Lane, Weoley Castle
- St Thomas Aquinas Catholic School – a Catholic school located on Wychall Lane in Kings Norton
- Balaam Wood School – a mixed school for students aged 11–16, located on New Street, Frankley
- St. Paul's School for Girls - a Catholic all-girls' school on Vernon Road, Edgbaston

=== Primary ===
- Meadows Primary, Bristol Road South
- Turves Green Primary
- Ley Hill Junior, Rhayader Road now called The Orchards Academy
- Bellfield Junior, Vineyard Road
- Wychall Primary, Middle Field Road
- Trescott Primary, Trescott Road
- Cofton Primary, Wootton Road
- St Brigid's Catholic Primary, Frankley Beeches Road
- St John Fisher Roman Catholic Primary, Alvechurch Road
- Woodcock Junior, Far Wood Road
- St. Laurence Church School, Bunbury Road (formerly located in Church Hill, opposite St Laurence's Church)

== Religious sites ==
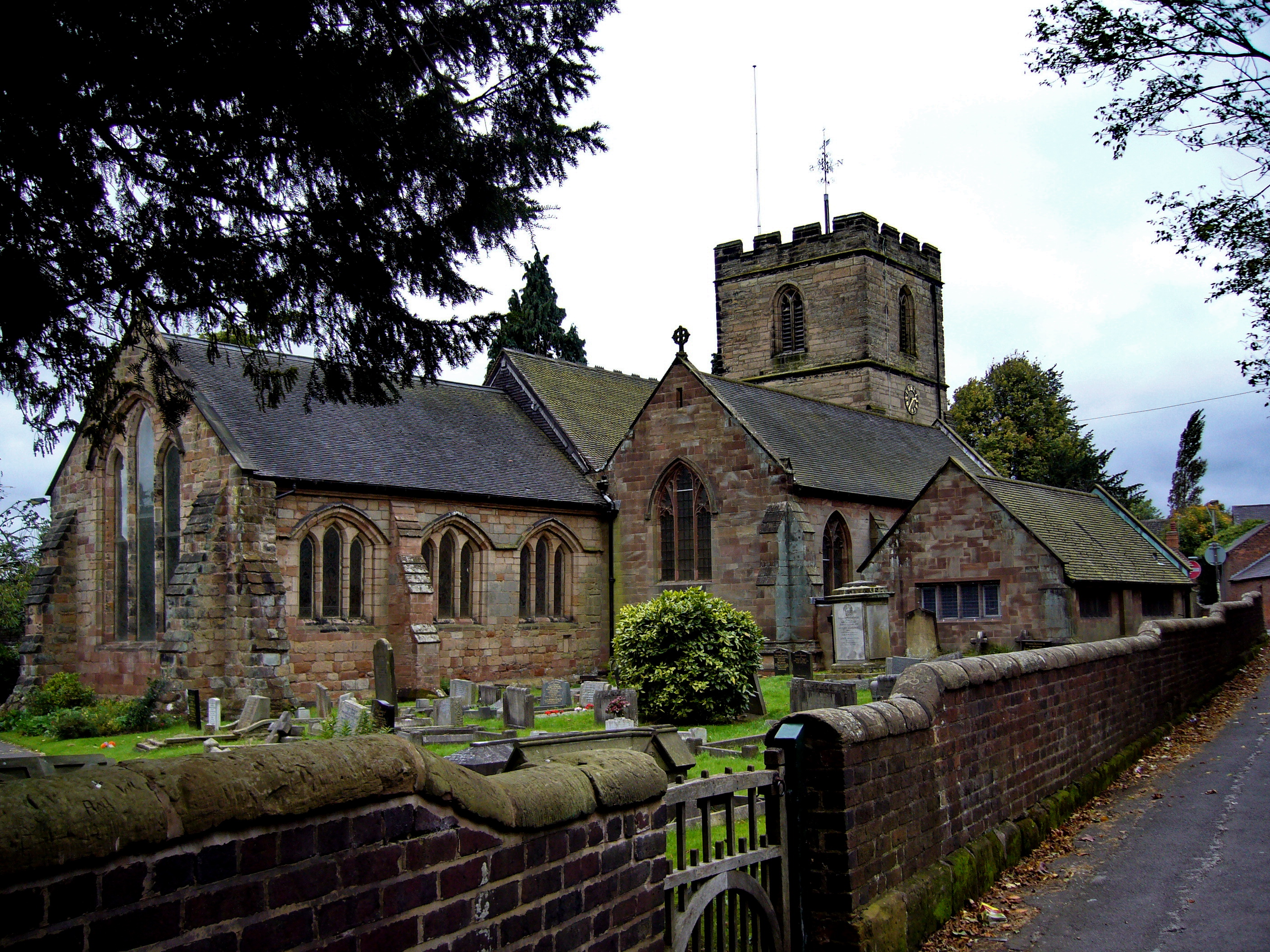
St. Laurence's Church, Church Hill dating from the 12th century

- Hollymoor Community Church, The Old Chapel (formerly Hollymoor Hospital Chapel) Manor Park Grove, B31 5ER
- St. Laurence's Church, Church Hill
- St Bartholomew's Church, located on the corner of Hoggs Lane & Allens Farm Road
- Our Lady And St Brigids Roman Catholic Church, Frankley Beeches Road (former church site)
- Northfield Methodist Church, Chatham Road
- Northfield Baptist Church, 789 Bristol Road South (on the high street opposite Lloyds TSB bank)

== Sporting facilities ==
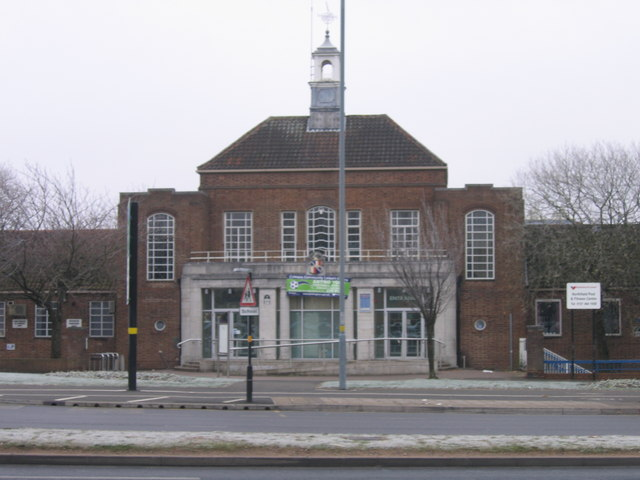
Old Northfield Swimming Baths designed by the architect Henry Walter Simister opened 8 May 1937

- North Worcestershire Golf Club on Frankley Beeches Road opened in 1907. The club was closed in April 2016 after becoming financially unsustainable, with shareholding members making a deal for sale and redevelopment with Bloor Homes. Subject to planning approval, the site will provide up to 1000 homes, a new primary school, a community hub and an eco-park. The site was previously ruled out for development in the Birmingham Development Plan.
- Northfield Town F.C. – Northfield Town Football Club had its origins on Victoria Common in the 1950s and played its matches at the rear of the telephone exchange on Church Road. The team is now based on Shenley Lane, Selly Oak.
- Northfield Swimming Pool and Fitness Centre – Opened in May 1937 and designed by Henry Simister for Birmingham Baths Committee as a municipal baths, the fitness suite was added in the 1980s. The handsome Art Deco building was finally demolished in 2017 to be replaced by a modern construction.
- Noticeable gyms in the area include Everlast (formerly Sports Direct), Urban Fitness and Nuffield Health.

== Local services ==
=== Hospitals ===
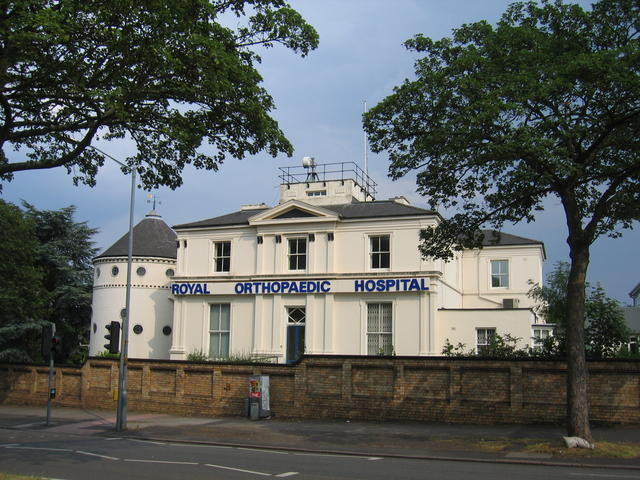
The Royal Orthopaedic Hospital

Northfield is served by the NHS Trust Selly Oak Hospital, now part of the University Hospital Trust and due to close shortly to move into new premises, occupies the premises of the former Kings Norton Union Workhouse although the infirmary buildings have not been used as wards for many years, but as offices and consulting rooms. Currently, part of the hospital is used as the main treatment centre for military casualties from Afghanistan and Iraq, as well as hosting the main prosthetic limb production and fitment centre in the West Midlands.

The specialist Royal Orthopaedic Hospital stands on the Bristol Road South, George Cadbury bought the Woodlands, as it was originally called, and gave it to the Crippled Children's Union in 1909 to be used as a hospital. A new £8 million out-patients department was opened in May 2011. The addition contains 24 consultation rooms, treatment rooms and other facilities replaced the temporary out-patients buildings that had been used since 1992.

Hollymoor Hospital, a psychiatric facility on Tessal Lane in Northfield, was built as an annexe to Rubery Lunatic Asylum by the Birmingham Corporation, opening in 1905. Hollymoor Hospital served as Northfield Military Hospital in the Second World War: it closed in 1995 and has largely been demolished.

=== Retail ===
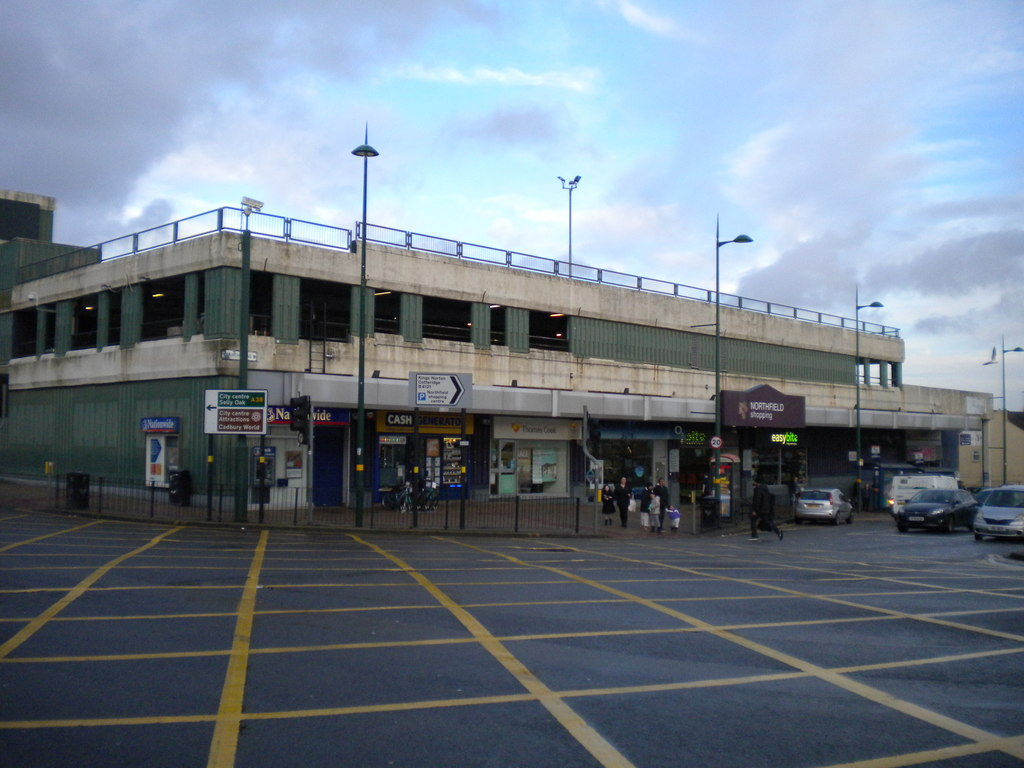
The Northfield Shopping Centre

The former Grosvenor shopping centre, has been renamed 'Northfield Shopping Centre' and contains several leading retail stores. The shops in Northfield town centre run along what used to be the main A38 (Bristol Road South; the A38 proper now bypasses the town centre), plus a supermarket on the junction with Frankley Beeches Road. There is also a covered market in the Bristol Rd shopping area. This shopping area serves a large region and is used by residents outside Northfield ward itself.

In June 2010, Northfield Radio Link scheme was launched across the town centre to allow shops to quickly share information with each other, security and the police to make the town safer.

A traditional farmers' market is held on the second Saturday of the month from 9-1:30 at Kings Norton Green and a car boot sale is held most Saturdays during the year in a field on Merrits Brook Lane.

=== Public facilities ===
There are also has a number of public facilities in Northfield town centre including Northfield Library, Northfield Community Partnership (help into jobs and community support), Connexions (help into jobs for young people), The Shop (advice for young people), Citizens Advice Bureau, Northfield Neighbourhood Office, Northfield Ecocentre and Victoria Common park.

=== Transport ===
The ward is served by both Northfield railway station and Longbridge railway station on the Cross-City Line. Several bus routes pass through the ward, including routes 18, 27, 48, 61, 63 and X20 operated by National Express West Midlands and routes 19, 39, 39A, and 55 are operated by Kev's Cars and Coaches.

Northfield is centred on the main A38 road, which runs southwards from Birmingham and leads to Bromsgrove, Worcester, Gloucester, Bristol, Exeter and eventually Bodmin in Cornwall. The section of this road through Northfield was traditionally very congested around the old village centre, but in 2006 a relief road was built, which has significantly improved the situation. The relief road involved widening a part of an existing road Bell Lane, a new by pass was also built and named, "Sir Herbert Austin Way" in recognition of Herbert Austin, 1st Baron Austin who started producing cars at the Longbridge plant and built Austin Village in the Northfield part of Turves Green.

=== Annual carnival ===
Northfield Carnival traditionally takes place every year on the first Saturday of July, run entirely by volunteers, in Victoria Common, a park located behind Northfield Shopping Centre.

== Notable people ==
- Jane Bunford – Britain's tallest ever person
- George Byrne – England cricketer
- George Cadbury – industrialist and founder of the famous chocolate brand
- Jocelyn Cadbury – public benefactor and Member of Parliament
- Gary Critchley – 1980s convicted of murder though the conviction may be unsafe
- Lewis Goodall- journalist and broadcaster
- George Langton Hodgkinson – Anglican clergyman and first class cricketer
- Digby Jones – Baron Jones of Birmingham, businessman and politician
- Ian Lavender – stage and TV actor, best known as Private Pike in Dad's Army
- The Rockin' Berries – 1960s pop band
- Stuart Linnell - broadcaster
- Sarah Smart - actress, lived in Northfield until 1987

== See also ==
- St. Laurence's Church, Northfield
- Bartley Reservoir
- Northfield Baths
- Northfield Manor House
- Black Horse, Northfield

== Bibliography ==
- Northfield by Pauline Caswell, (1996), published by Tempus Publishing Limited
