= Oaks Sixth Form College =

- Birmingham, West Midlands; England

Information
- Type: Sixth Form college'
- Local authority: Birmingham
- Gender: Coeducational
- Age: 16+
- Website: http://www.oaks6thform.co.uk/

Oaks Sixth Form College is a consortium of six secondary school sixth forms in South-West Birmingham.

The consortium consists of: Dame Elizabeth Cadbury School, Harborne Academy, Hillcrest School and Sixth Form Centre, Lordswood Sixth Form Centre, Shenley Academy, and St. Thomas Aquinas Catholic School.
