= King's Norton Boys' School =

Secondary school in Birmingham, England

King Edward VI King’s Norton School for Boys
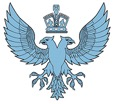
- King's Norton Boys' Eagle Logo - Adopted September 2017

Location
- Northfield Road; Kings Norton; Birmingham, West Midlands, B30 1DY; England; 52°25′02″N 1°56′30″W

Information
- Type: Academy
- Motto: Latin "Humani Semper Contendimus"
- Established: 1910
- Local authority: Birmingham City Council
- Department for Education URN: 103562 Tables
- Ofsted: Reports
- Chair of Governing Board: Simon Chatterton
- Headteacher: David Clayton
- Deputy Headteacher: Jonathan Butcher
- Gender: Boys
- Age: 11 to 16
- Enrolment: 820
- Colours: Navy blue and Light Sky Blue
- Website: https://knsb.kevibham.org/

King Edward VI King’s Norton School for Boys, (formerly known as King’s Norton Boys’ School) is a secondary school for around 800 pupils aged 11 to 16. It is located on Northfield Road in Kings Norton within the formal district of Northfield of the city of Birmingham, England. It is situated east of the A441, just north of the B4121 in Cotteridge.

== History ==
It was founded as a boys' grammar school in the reign of King Edward VI, circa 1550. It was refounded in 1912. In the 1960s, when administered by the City of Birmingham Education Committee, it had around 600 boys. It became a boys' comprehensive school in 1975. The grammar school had five houses in the 1960s, but they amalgamated to four in 1969. It was announced that the sixth form centre at Kings Norton boys school would close following the 2017–2018 school year and the year 7 intake increased to 150 students.

In September 2023, King’s Norton Boys’ School received approval from the West Midlands Regional Advisory Board into the Foundation of the Schools of King Edward VI, and is in the process of conversion, and expected to complete in January 2024, to become King Edward VI King’s Norton School for Boys.

== Curriculum ==
Pupils follow a broad curriculum that includes National Curriculum core subjects to GCSE and A-Level. The school was designated a Sixth Form Specialist Science College in 2004, and a collaborative scheme exists for sharing 6th form resources with Kings Norton Girls' School.

An October 2017 Ofsted report classed the school as 'Good'

== Notable former pupils ==
- Archie Brown, Footballer
- Richard Blaze, rugby player
- Robert Flello, Labour MP from 2005 to 2017 for Stoke-on-Trent South
- Adrian Goldberg radio & TV presenter/reporter
- Edward J Mason, radio, television and film scriptwriter
- Caryl Phillips, writer, Professor of English
- Alan Smith, Leicester City and Arsenal footballer and TV pundit

=== King's Norton Grammar School for Boys ===
- Arthur Bywater, the only civilian to have been awarded the GC and the GM
- Roxbee Cox, Baron Kings Norton, chancellor from 1969 to 1997 of Cranfield University, and aeronautical engineer
- Doug Hele, motorcycle engineer
- Sir Julian Horn-Smith, chief operating officer from 2001 to 2004 of Vodafone and member of Vodafone's founding management
- Stuart Linnell, radio & TV presenter, Radio Hallam, Mercia Sound, BBC Local Radio, BBC West Midlands television, & former reporter for Sky Sports News
- Bob Mills, comedian, actor, radio presenter and former TV personality
- Enoch Powell (briefly), Financial Secretary to the Treasury 1957–58, Minister of Health 1960–63, Shadow Secretary of State for Defence 1965–68
- Leslie Seymour, Conservative MP from 1959 to 1964 for Birmingham Sparkbrook
- Chris Skudder, sports presenter/correspondent Sky News & Sky Sports News

== See also ==
- List of English and Welsh endowed schools (19th century)
