= Shenley Academy =

Location
- Weoley Castle, Northfield; Birmingham, West Midlands, B29 4HE; England; 52°25′44.19″N 1°58′37.36″W

Information
- Type: Academy
- Motto: Building Futures. Changing Lives.
- Established: 4 September 2009
- Local authority: Birmingham
- Department for Education URN: 135911 Tables
- Ofsted: Reports
- Executive Headteacher: Kerry Solway-Blower
- Staff: 94
- Gender: Coeducational
- Age: 11 to 16
- Enrolment: 1054
- Capacity: 1150
- Houses: Apollo; Jupiter; Mercury; Neptune; Saturn; Venus
- Colours: Yellow, red and grey
- Website: www.shenleyacademy.org.uk

Shenley Academy (formerly known as Shenley Court Specialist Arts College) is a mixed secondary school and sixth form located in the Weoley Castle area of southwest Birmingham. It first opened on 4 September 2009. The school's academy sponsor is E-ACT, a non-profit education foundation.

In October 2018 the school received an Ofsted inspection stating that every area of the Academy was inadequate. With the results of this inspection the Academy was placed into special measures with a "notice to terminate" letter delivered to E-ACT stating if actions were not taken to remove these special measures, E-ACT would lose its sponsorship of Shenley Academy and Shenley would be transferred to a new Academy Trust. However in July 2021, Shenley had its first section 5 inspection since 2018. This report stated the school was now overall a "good" school with three of the four areas inspected judged outstanding.

Shenley became an academy in 2009. A £24-million building was constructed for the academy, and opened on 10 September 2012 following a 19-month build programme.

The sixth form provision was offered as part of Oaks Sixth Form College, a consortium of 7 secondary schools in South-West Birmingham.
