= ROF Kirkby =

World War II munitions factory in Merseyside, UK

Coordinates: 53.487°N 2.855°W

ROF Kirkby, (Filling Factory No. 7) was a large World War II Royal Ordnance Factory (ROF) filling munitions. The factory was based in the rural area of Kirkby, on the outskirts of Liverpool, Merseyside. The rural location was to reduce the potential damage from any accidental explosions. Munitions were produced from September 1940 to March 1946.

== History ==
Original planning for the site began at Royal Arsenal, Woolwich, with Sir Alex Gibson acting as consultant and Holloway Brothers the contractors. When completed the factory consisted of more than 1,000 buildings, 18 miles (29 km) of roads and 23 miles (37 km) of railway lines along with a station and had cost £8,500,000 (approx. £1,800 million inflation adjusted as share of GDP). As a way to minimise the risk of damage in the event of an explosion taking place the buildings were widely spaced and some were mounded up to the eaves.

In July 1940 Lawrence Gale from the Royal Arsenal, Woolwich, was appointed the Superintendent, taking 9 staff with him, and when the first shells rolled off the assembly line in September 1940 there were only between 50 and 100 employees. By the summer of 1941 this had risen to 10,000 before rising to a peak of around 23,000 employees, most of whom were women. Medical treatment rooms were built onsite in order to cater to such a large workforce. When the Royal Arsenal, Woolwich was bombed, it had to be closed down and many workers and a large amount of material were transferred to ROF Kirkby. In order to house these employees, 200 houses for key workers were built in the area and a YWCA hostel was built to house 1,000 women. The factory employed a three shift system so that production was continuous, combining with the transport system so that as it dropped off one shift of employees it would take home another shift. In December 1940, a railway station was opened on the Liverpool to Wigan Wallgate line to service the factory. It closed in March 1946.

The ROF was eventually closed in March 1946, having been designated a War Duration Only ROF. It had produced around ten per cent of all the ammunition used in World War II by Britain. Afterwards the site was developed by Liverpool Corporation as an industrial estate and played a large part in the growth of Kirkby from a population of barely over 3,000 in 1951 to over 52,000 by 1961.

== Accidents ==
There were two explosions at Kirkby ROF, one in February 1944 and one on 15 September 1944. Two people were killed in the first accident and 14 killed and 11 injured in the second. It took three months of work to clear 4,000 bombs which were buried in the rubble after the second accident, with a total of 37 awards for bravery and distinguished conduct made by the King. These included both the George Cross and George Medal to Arthur Bywater, for his brave conduct during both explosions.
