= Arthur Bywater =

George Cross recipient

Richard Arthur Samuel Bywater GC, GM
- Arthur Bywater
- Born: 3 November 1913; Birmingham, England
- Died: 6 April 2005 (aged 91); Australia
- Awards: George Cross; George Medal

Richard Arthur Samuel Bywater, GC, GM (3 November 1913 – 6 April 2005) won the George Cross and George Medal, one of only eight people to have been awarded both medals, and the only civilian.

He was born on 3 November 1913 in Birmingham, and educated at Kings Norton Grammar School and Birmingham University (BSc Chemistry, 1935; MSc Chemistry, 1936). After working for three years in manufacturing, in early 1939 Bywater joined the Royal Filling Factory at the Royal Arsenal, Woolwich, and in 1940 he took charge of the factory's fuse section.

The following year, Bywater moved to Kirkby as a Royal Ordnance Factory development officer. On 22 February 1944 there was an accident at the arms factory at ROF Kirkby, in Lancashire (now Merseyside). Nineteen workers, mainly women, were filling fuses when one exploded, killing one woman immediately and wounding two others, one of whom later died of her injuries. The fuse had exploded because of a defective striker and Bywater realised that the whole building, which contained 12,000 highly explosive fuses, was in danger of igniting. He led three other volunteers in the hazardous work of clearing the wrecked factory of 12,724 fuses over the next three days, plus another 4,000 which were believed to be defective. Bywater's award of the George Cross for this work was published in the London Gazette on 26 September 1944.

Later the same year, on 15 September 1944, there were a series of explosions at the Kirkby factory, killing 14 people. Again, Bywater organised the evacuation of the building and led the team in the dangerous operation of clearing the unexploded ammunition. Each of the 4,000 bombs had to be taken away for destruction separately, a job that took three months. In his report, the director-general of filling factories wrote: "the work was possibly the most dangerous ever attempted in an industrial factory". For this, he was awarded the George Medal, published in the London Gazette on 18 September 1945.

== After the war ==
After the war, he became works manager of R. N. Coate and Co., the cider makers, at Nailsea, near Bristol. In 1954 he emigrated to Australia and took Australian citizenship. After helping to set up an ordnance factory in New South Wales, he joined the Reserve Bank of Australia in Melbourne.

In 1999 he wrote Some Reminiscences of a Non-combatant, an account of his wartime experiences.

He died in Australia on 6 April 2005, aged 91.
