= West Heath Hospital =

- Birmingham Community Healthcare NHS Foundation Trust
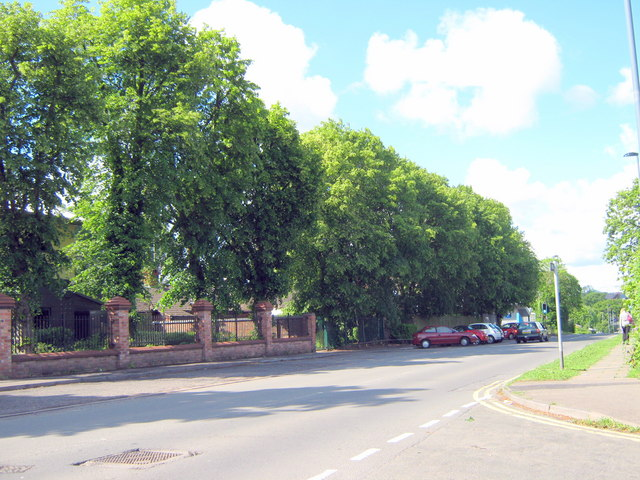
- West Heath Hospital (on the left)

- Location within West Midlands

Geography
- Location: Rednal Road, West Heath, West Midlands, England
- Coordinates: 52.3980°N 1.9538°W

Organisation
- Care system: NHS
- Type: Geriatric

History
- Founded: 1889

Links
- Website: NHS - West Heath Hospital
- Lists: Hospitals in England

West Heath Hospital is a health facility on Rednal Road in West Heath, West Midlands, England. It is managed by Birmingham Community Healthcare NHS Foundation Trust.

== History ==
The facility was established as the Kings Norton Infectious Diseases Hospital in 1889. Following a reduction in smallpox cases to very low levels in the United Kingdom, it became a tuberculosis hospital in 1910 and, after joining the National Health Service in 1948, it was renamed West Heath Hospital in 1954. A kitchen block was added in 1956 and it became a geriatric hospital in 1980. After modern facilities had been built on the site, the original 19th-century building was withdrawn from use and demolished in 2008.
