= Gary Critchley =

British man

- Born: 13 August 1962 (age 64); Birmingham
- Citizenship: British

Gary Critchley (born 13 August 1962) is a British man who was convicted of murder in 1981 and ultimately released in 2012, having continuously maintained his innocence.

== Early life and background ==
Critchley grew up in Northfield, Birmingham. As a teenager he became involved in left-wing politics and the punk movement. In 1977 Critchley was excluded from school for leading 'pupil power' demonstrations. He finished his secondary education in a borstal after being convicted of theft and criminal damage. On his release Critchley developed a serious drug problem, drifting further into crime. In 1980 he moved to London.

== Arrest and murder conviction ==
In June 1980 Critchley was found lying unconscious outside a London squat. He had suffered head injuries, a broken back, ankle and wrist. Critchley was wearing a boot on one foot and an undone trainer, two sizes too small, on the other. Police searched the squat and found the body of Edward McNeill who had been brutally beaten to death. A bloody imprint at the murder scene matched the trainer on Critchley's foot and he was arrested.

Critchley was charged with murder and subsequently convicted. He was ordered to be detained at Her Majesty's Pleasure, the juvenile equivalent of a life sentence. The judge recommended that he should receive a maximum tariff of nine years.

== Campaign ==
Critchley's family persistently campaigned for his release arguing that his original conviction was unsafe. They maintain that the only forensic evidence to link him to the heavily blood splattered murder scene was on the ill-fitting trainer and that witness statements naming somebody else as the killer were never put before the court.

Critchley's campaigners received the support of Richard Burden MP who tabled questions in Parliament regarding this matter.

== Release, reimprisonment and later events ==
Critchley was twice released from prison on licence but was returned there on both occasions after breaching its conditions. He was once again released in March 2012 and currently remains free.
