= George Langton Hodgkinson =

English Anglican clergyman and sportsman

George Langton Hodgkinson (Kentish Town, 13 February 1837 – 16 February 1915, Wotton-under-Edge, Gloucestershire) was an Anglican clergyman. A keen sportsman, he played first-class cricket for Oxford University and Middlesex. He was also the founder of Gainsborough Trinity Football Club.

The second son of George Hodgkinson, of Kentish Town, G. L. Hodgkinson was educated at Harrow, where he was a member of the cricket eleven and twice represented the school in the annual fixture against Eton. He matriculated at Pembroke College, Oxford in 1856, obtaining a B.A. degree in 1860 and an M.A. in 1863. He was awarded a Blue whilst still a freshman, and played against Cambridge University on three occasions. He was a right-handed batsman and was regarded as a good slip fielder. In his 11 first-class matches he averaged 7.58 with the bat from 18 innings, and as a bowler he took 13 wickets whilst conceding only 61 runs (average 4.69). He also represented the M.C.C., and Gentlemen v Players.

Hodgkinson was ordained deacon by the Bishop of Lincoln in 1861 and priest the following year. He was curate of Gainsborough from 1861 to 1862, and of East Retford from 1863 to 1867. In 1867 he returned to Gainsborough and was inducted as vicar of Holy Trinity parish, a post he held until 1891. From 1891 to 1900 he was rector of Northfield, near Birmingham.

He died aged 78 in February 1915.
