= Black Horse, Northfield =

Black Horse
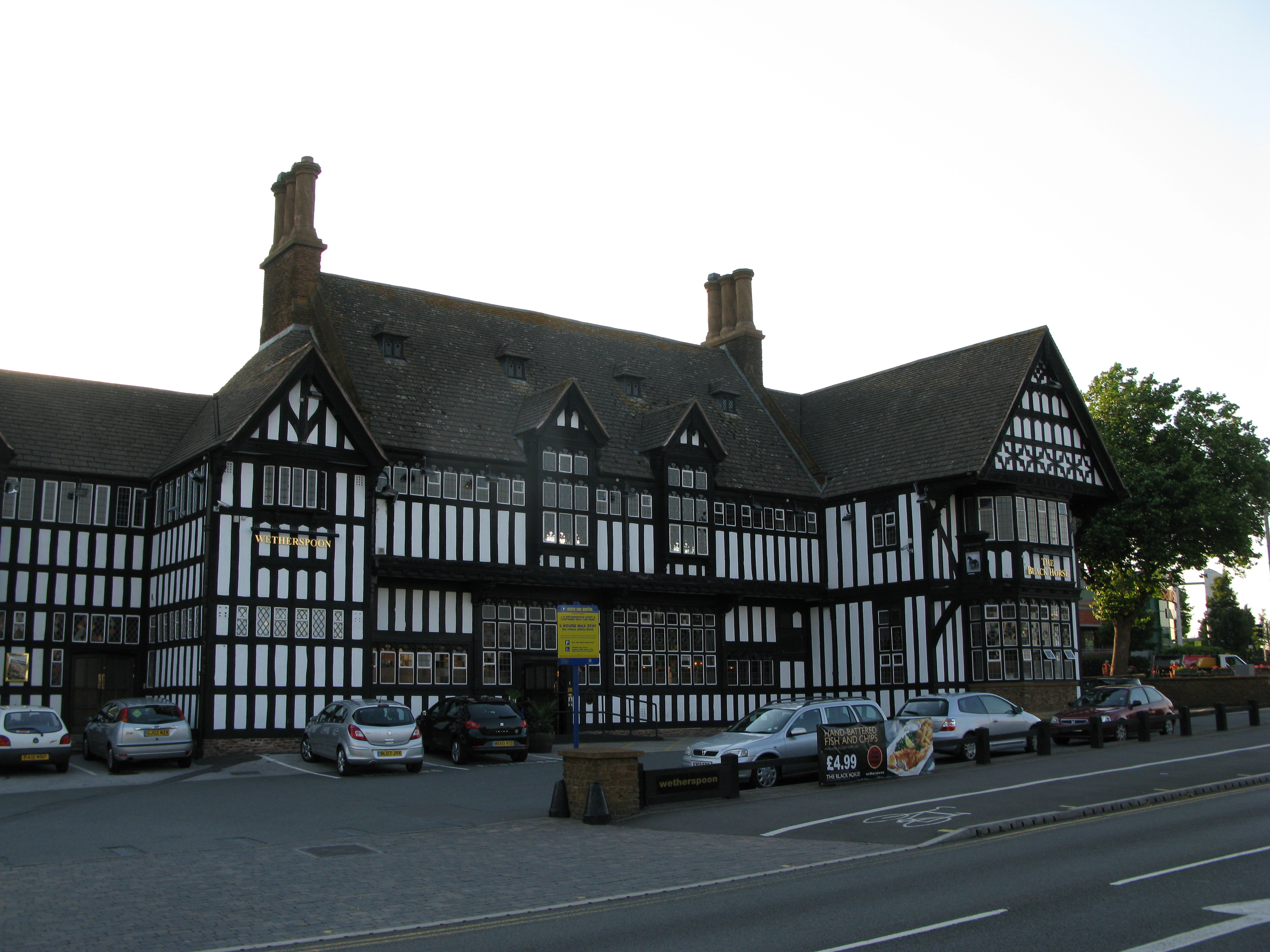
- The Black Horse
- Interactive map of the Black Horse area

General information
- Type: Public house
- Architectural style: Brewer's Tudor
- Location: Northfield, Birmingham, England
- Coordinates: 52.411788°N 1.973787°W
- Construction started: 1929
- Completed: 1930
- Client: John Davenport and Sons

Design and construction
- Architect: Francis Goldsbrough
- Awards and prizes: Grade II* listed

The Black Horse is a Grade II* listed public house in Northfield, Birmingham, England. The building had its Grade-II heritage status upgraded to II* in August 2015.

== History ==
The 1904 Licensing Act gave magistrates powers to close public houses that were considered socially harmful. The Black Horse was built in the suburbs. At that time many public houses were built in the suburbs and designed to encourage respectable clientele since the licence could otherwise be withdrawn.

There was originally a gravelled drive for coach parties, motor vehicles, charabancs and other horse-drawn vehicles. The Black Horse is one of the largest Public houses ever built in Brewer's Tudor style. There are bars, dining areas, and a replica great hall. The rear of the Black Horse is in Cotswold stone facing a terrace garden.

The earlier public house was demolished and this building was erected in 1929–1930 to the designs of the architect Francis Goldsbrough of Bateman & Bateman. The client was the brewery company John Davenport and Sons. The stone carving was done by Sidney Smithin and the wood carving by Jean Hahn. The Black Horse was further refurbished in the early 21st century.

John Davenport and Sons was taken over by Greenall Whitley in 1986 and afterwards the pub became a Wetherspoons house.
