= Turves Green =

Area of Birmingham, England

Coordinates: 52.3994°N 1.9706°W

Turves Green is an area of Birmingham partly in West Heath and partly in Northfield (the boundary between these two wards runs through Turves Green). In addition the area of Longbridge borders Turves Green. A road with the simple name Turves Green runs through the area.

== Past ==
In the Mediaeval era Turves Green was considered good grazing, the name originally meant, "turf green" which meant Common land and the land was probably enclosed during the late 1850s. The land remained agricultural till Austin Village was built there during World War I for workers producing munitions in a Longbridge factory. Between the world wars council houses with gardens were built bordering Turves Green mostly on the West Heath side.

== Present day ==
During the 1960s a Council estate was built and Turves was conceived. The area round Fairfax Rd includes, Semi-detached houses, Terraced houses, single story bungalows, and nine ten story Tower blocks. There are also four story maisonettes where one lot of tenant occupy the lower two stories and have two small gardens while a second lot of tenants must climb two flights of stairs to reach their front doors and have balconies instead of gardens. There is a small group of shops on Fairfax Rd including two small supermarkets selling food, also general goods and a furniture clearance store.

A small area of Turves Green remains open without building and Birmingham City Council maintains this as a recreation area. In 2011 Birmingham Council added a children's play area with attractions including a roundabout, swings and an assault course with slides. Turves Green Brook, which is a tributary to the River Rea runs through the recreation area, partly open, partly in culverts. The recreation area consists of mown grass, with a few benches and alongside the brook natural woodland. The woodland looks pleasant, during the spring there are pussy willow, blackthorn and hawthorn which flower in succession. After the willows have finished flowering white flowers of hemlock give the area a deadly beauty in sections which the council leaves unmown. Later in the year Himalayan balsam and bindweed flower there and stinging nettles are prominent. In winter evergreen trees and plants including ivy on deciduous trees provides some greenery together with the grass.

Near the play area on either side of the brook is a small spinney with trees including oaks, larches and other conifers. Residents sometimes use the woodland for recreation but the brook is polluted and there is frequently a noticeable smell. The grassy area is acceptable and residents use it more. In the part of the recreational area nearer to Longbridge is a basketball court and post war private houses border the recreational area there. Older private houses are along Longbridge Lane which borders the top part of the recreational area.

The council estate is socially mixed, some residents face poverty and social exclusion, others enjoy better incomes and some could afford to buy their council houses. Those with jobs are typically skilled or unskilled manual workers. Anti-social behaviour may be reported to Birmingham City Council who endeavour to prevent or reduce it. Overall there are far fewer problems with anti-social behaviour than in many sink estates.

On the road, Turves Green there is a small shopping centre with a Cooperative shop and a Dental technician among others, near those shops are more post-war council houses, maisonettes and flats with further tower blocks. The road, Turves Green has mainly private houses with some two-story private maisonettes and some council properties. Turves Green Boys' School and King Edward VI Northfield School for Girls, both secondary schools and Turves Green Primary School are also all on that road.
