= Austin Village =

Housing estate in Birmingham, England

Coordinates: 52.401°N 1.973°W

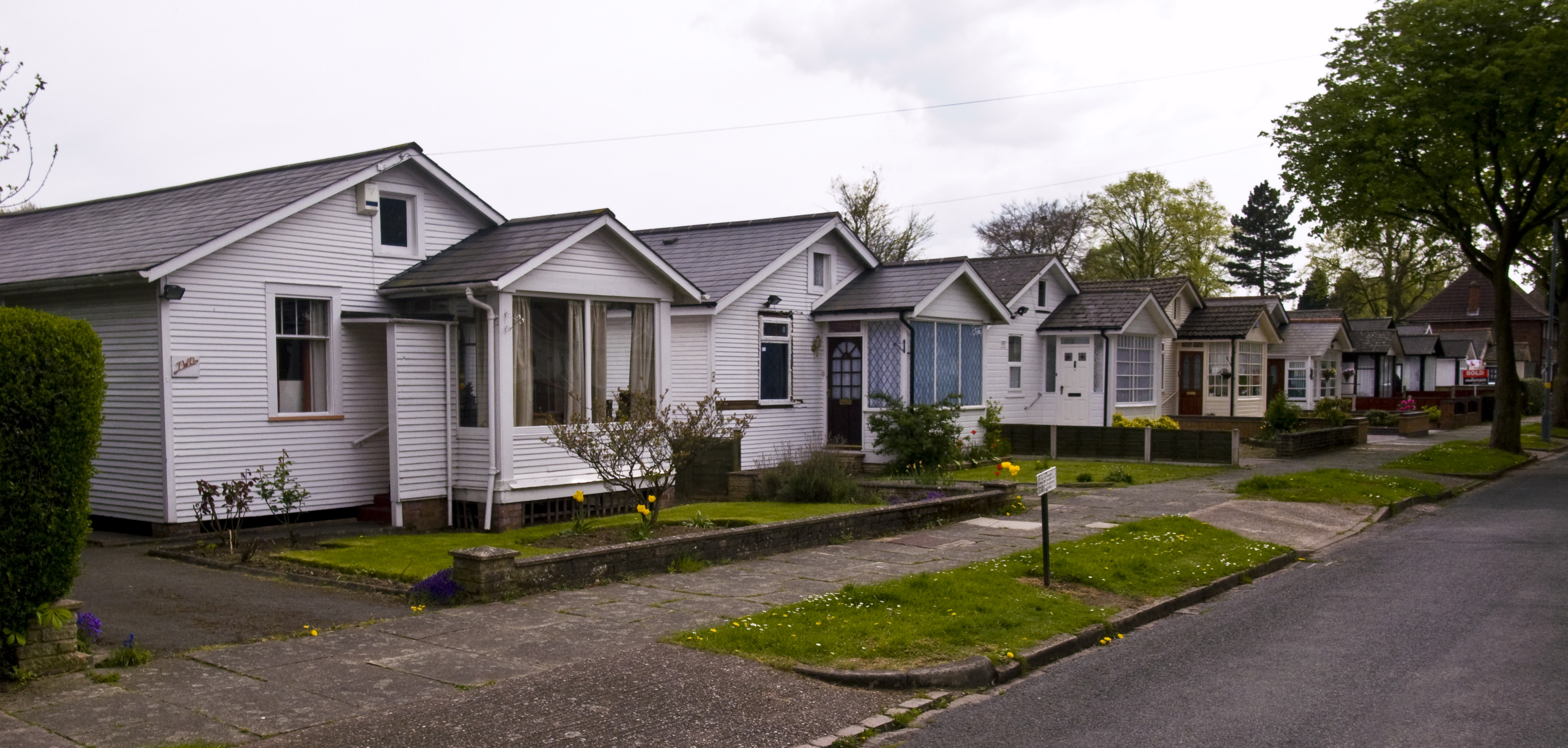
Some of the two hundred cedar wood prefabricated bungalows, erected during the First World War in Austin Village

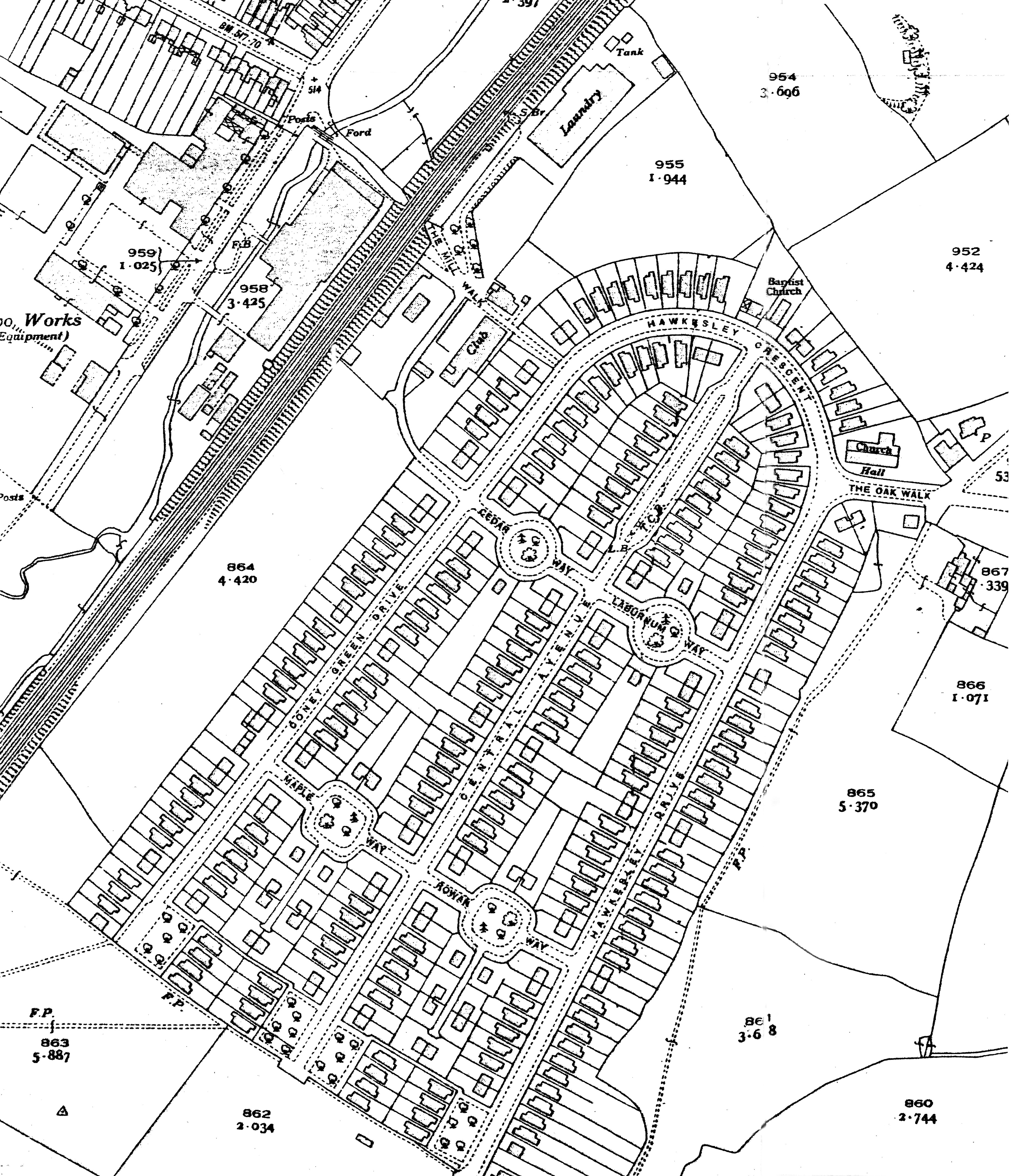
Austin Village between the wars — Ordnance Survey 1:2500 map, 1936, showing fields around the village

Austin Village is a First World War housing estate of prefabs between Longbridge and Northfield, Birmingham.

Herbert Austin, who created the Austin Motor Company at Longbridge in 1905, had to take on more workers during the First World War when his factory became involved in making tanks and aircraft. In 1917, he built a new estate for his employees in Turves Green on land bought for £7,750. He imported 200 red cedar wood pre-fabricated bungalows from the Aladdin Company, Bay City, Michigan, USA. The purchase price at the time was £150 per bungalow. They were shipped across the Atlantic and survived potential loss by U-boat attack. These were erected with twenty-five conventional brick-built semi-detached houses at intervals to create firebreaks. They were fitted with coke-fired central heating, gas cooker, gas water boiler, sink and drainer, and a bathroom with bath. The external size of the bungalows was 6.84 yards (6.25 m) wide by 11.75 yards (10.74 m) deep with an additional porch at the front and boiler room at the rear. The three bedrooms were each 9 feet 7 inches (2.92 m) square. The brick houses were also fitted with two gas fires.

Two octagonal children's shelters were built in the islands in Rowan and Laburnum Way but these have now gone. Hawkesley Farm buildings were converted to a village hall and club room.

Mature trees were planted along the roads: Central Avenue, Hawkesley Crescent, Hawkesley Drive, Coney Green Drive, Cypress Way, Cedar Way, Laburnum Way, Rowan Way and Maple Way. The village was completed in eleven months and rented to Austin workers with seven in each bungalow and twelve in each house.

A wooden Baptist church (now demolished) was built opposite the north end of Central Avenue and an Anglican church (Church of the Epiphany, now gone) was built on the corner of the Oak Walk.

After the war the requirement for workers reduced and the bungalows sold. The estate is now occupied and surrounded by conventional suburban housing. It forms the Austin Village Conservation Area. Historic England has listed the conservation area on its Heritage at Risk Register due to its deterioration.

== See also ==
- Kit house
- Model Villages
