= Turves Green Boys' School =

Location
- Turves Green; Birmingham, West Midlands, B31 4BS; England; 52.3977°N 1.9708°W

Information
- Type: Academy
- Motto: Success Through Endeavour
- Established: 1939
- Local authority: Birmingham City Council
- Department for Education URN: 148521 Tables
- Ofsted: Reports
- Head teacher: Executive Headteacher - Mr James Till, Head of School - Mr Theo Walker
- Gender: Boys
- Age: 11 to 16
- Enrolment: 648
- Houses: Boulton, Austin, Tolkien
- Colours: Black & White
- Website: http://www.tgbs.co.uk/

Turves Green Boys' School is a secondary school in the West Heath area of Birmingham, England. It is approximately 80 years old. The school is an all-boys school which previously held Technology College and Humanities College status. It received Technology College status in 1995.

The OFSTED inspection report of 2019 rated the school as ‘Inadequate’ and placed the school in special measures. The Board of Governors was dismissed in February 2020 and an Interim Executive Board was installed with view to preparing the school for academisation.

The school was formerly under local authority control but was directed to convert to an academy status in May 2021. The DFE directed the school to join the Matrix Academy Trust. The trust decided to keep the former name of the school and installed Mr James Till as the new, founding Headteacher. In March 2024 the school was inspected for the first time as an academy. The school received an overall Good judgement and Outstanding judgements in Leadership and Management and Behaviour and Attitudes. In May 2024 Mr James Till was promoted to Executive Headteacher where he also oversees the running of Dame Elizabeth Cadbury School and Bloxwich Academy. Day to day operations at the school are now overseen by Mr Theo Walker in his capacity as Head of School

The 1960s chart topping band The Rockin' Berries first formed while several members were pupils at Turves Green Boys’ School.

== Notable alumni ==
Lewis Goodall, former BBC journalist, was a pupil at Turves Green Boys’ School.

Nira Chamberlain , a mathematician and past President of the Institute of Mathematics and its Applications, was a pupil at Turves Green Boys' School 1980-1985.

== See also ==
- Turves Green
- King Edward VI Northfield School for Girls (formerly Turves Green Girls' School)
