= King Edward VI Lordswood School for Girls =

Location
- Knightlow Road; Harborne; Birmingham, West Midlands, B17 8QB; England; 52°28′08″N 1°57′48″W

Information
- Type: Academy
- Motto: Quod Possum Perficio Cognoscere Rerum Causas
- Established: 1958
- Local authority: Birmingham City Council
- Department for Education URN: 136592 Tables
- Ofsted: Reports
- Chair of the Governors: R. Minott
- Headteacher: Kerry Cooney
- Gender: Girls
- Age: 11 to 18
- Enrolment: 959 as of March 2016
- Colours: Blue and White mainly
- Website: https://lsg.kevibham.org/

King Edward VI Lordswood School for Girls and The Sixth Form Centre is a secondary school and sixth form on Knightlow Road in Birmingham between Harborne and Bearwood.

== History ==
It was established in 1958 as a grammar technical school (as was the neighbouring boys' school from 1962, although it opened in 1957), whereby entrance was governed by doing well in an entrance exam (11-plus). In 1973 it became a comprehensive school. In September 2005 it became a specialist Arts College. The school converted to academy status in April 2011.

On 1 June 2012, Lordswood had their grand opening of their new science block. This was officially opened by Gisela Stuart MP.

In January 2013, Lordswood Boys' School also converted to academy status and joined Lordswood Girls' School as part of Lordswood Academies Trust.

In July 2017 Lordswood Boys' School left Lordswood Academies Trust after an extended period in Special Measures after being rated Inadequate in multiple Ofsted inspections and undergoing a severe drop in the number of students enrolled. The newly formed Central Academies Trust took over running of the boys school from September 2017

In March 2022 an Ofsted inspection rated Lordswood Girls’ School as ‘Requires Improvement’ focusing on inadequate leadership, curriculum planning and poor tracking of student progress. Following this, in July 2022, National Education Union members at the school balloted in favour of strike action in opposition to forced transfer of their employment to King Edward VI Academy Trust as well as in opposition to ongoing ‘unacceptable management practices’.

== Admissions ==
It is a female-only school for ages 11–18, with a mixed 6th form. It is situated close to the A4040 (Lordswood Road), just south of the A456 (Hagley Road) junction. Next door, to the north, is the Lordswood Boys' School.

The school has a mixed sixth form provision along with Lordswood Boys' School. The sixth form provision as a whole forms part of Oaks Sixth Form College, a consortium of six secondary schools in South-West Birmingham.

== Academic performance ==
The school consistently gets good results at GCSE level. At A level, the results are above the England average.

Lordswood Girls’ School was rated Requires Improvement (3) at its latest Ofsted inspection (March 2022). This was the first full Ofsted report since converting to an academy in 2011. Previous to academisation the school had been rated Outstanding.

The 2019 Progress 8 score for the school was +0.74 with a rating of Well Above Average.

== Notable former pupils ==
- Preet Gill, Member of Parliament (MP) for Birmingham Edgbaston
- Debbie Isitt, writer, film director and performer.
