= St Thomas Aquinas Catholic School, Birmingham =

St Thomas Aquinas Catholic School

Location
- Wychall Lane; Birmingham, West Midlands, B38 8AP; England
- Coordinates: 52.4099°N 1.9472°W

Information
- Type: Academy
- Religious affiliation: Catholic
- Local authority: Birmingham
- Department for Education URN: 141835 Tables
- Ofsted: Reports
- Headteacher: Chris Martin
- Gender: Mixed
- Age: 11 to 18
- Enrolment: approx. 1225
- Houses: Fisher, Newman, Romero, Teressa, Martin, John Paul, Bosco, More
- Website: http://www.stacs.org/

St. Thomas Aquinas Catholic School is a mixed Catholic secondary school in Kings Norton, Birmingham, England.

The school, which is part of the Birmingham Catholic Partnership, consists of key stage three (Yr 7 and 8), key stage four (years 9 to 11) and a sixth form. The sixth form provision is offered as part of Oaks Sixth Form College, a consortium of 7 secondary schools in South-West Birmingham.

The school has a library, known as the Aquinas Resource Centre or the "ARC". Facilities also include a large playground, a large sports hall, a gym, and a music technology suite.

== Notable former pupils ==
- Darren Bradley (b. 1965) - footballer, West Bromwich Albion
- Martin Duffy (1967-2022) - Primal Scream musician
- Ian Ashbee (b. 1976) - footballer, Hull City A.F.C., football manager
- Gavin Mahon (b. 1977) - footballer, Queens Park Rangers
- Ayo Akinwolere (b. 1982) - television presenter, co-presenter of Blue Peter
- Dan Preston (b. 1991) - footballer, AFC Telford United
- Josh Cooke (b. 1997) - footballer, Swindon Town
- Aidan Davis (b. 1997) - rapper, television host, Britain's Got Talent finalist and presenter of CBBC's Friday Download
