= King Edward VI Northfield School for Girls =

Coordinates: 52.4009°N 1.9674°W

Location
- Turves Green; Northfield; Birmingham, West Midlands, B31 4BP; England

Information
- Type: Academy
- Local authority: Birmingham City Council
- Trust: Foundation of the Schools of King Edward VI
- Department for Education URN: 148684 Tables
- Ofsted: Reports
- Headteacher: Neil Jones
- Gender: Girls
- Age: 11 to 16
- Enrolment: 649 as of February 2021
- Website: Official website

King Edward VI Northfield School for Girls (formerly Turves Green Girls' School) is a secondary school located on Turves Green in the Northfield area of Birmingham, in the West Midlands of England.

Previously a foundation school administered by Birmingham City Council and The Endeavour Co-operative Learning Trust. In September 2021 the school converted to academy status and was renamed King Edward VI Northfield School for Girls. The school is now sponsored by the Foundation of the Schools of King Edward VI.

Pupils attending the school mainly come from the Kings Norton, Longbridge and Northfield areas of Birmingham. King Edward VI Northfield School for Girls offers GCSEs and Level 2 vocational awards as programmes of study for pupils.

== See also ==
- Turves Green Boys' School
