= Lickey Hills Country Park =

Country park in Worcestershire, England

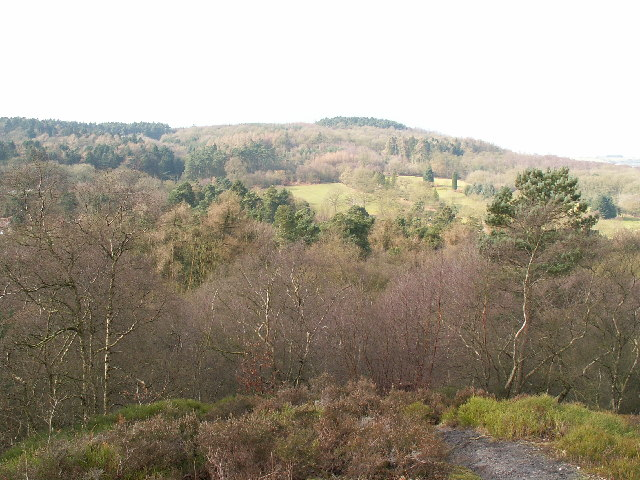
- Lickey Hills Country Park, from Bilberry Hill over Rosehill Road and the Birmingham Municipal Golf Course towards Beacon Hill. Bilberry bushes in the foreground.
- Interactive map of Lickey Hills Country Park
- Location: Birmingham, England
- Coordinates: 52°22′36″N 2°00′37″W
- Area: 524 acres (212 ha)
- Operator: Birmingham City Council
- Awards: Green Flag
- Public transit: Barnt Green railway station
- Website: www.birmingham.gov.uk/lickeyhills

Lickey Hills Country Park is a country park in England. It is 10 miles (16 kilometres) south-west of Birmingham and 24 miles (39 kilometres) north-east of Worcester. The 524 acres (212 ha) park is situated just south of Rednal and close to Barnt Green. It is half a mile west of Cofton Hackett. It is one of the oldest parks managed by Birmingham City Council. The hills rise to 298 m (978 ft) above sea level at Beacon Hill.

The park exists in its current form only through the activities and generosity of the early 20th-century philanthropic Birmingham Society for the Preservation of Open Spaces who purchased Rednal Hill and later arranged for Pinfield Wood and Bilberry Hill to be permanently leased on a nominal peppercorn rent. The society included such prominent and public spirited luminaries as T. Grosvenor Lee, Ivor Windsor-Clive, 2nd Earl of Plymouth and several elders of the Cadbury family led by George Cadbury and his wife Dame Elizabeth Cadbury. The society gave the original park to the people of Birmingham in 1888, with further tracts being added progressively until 1933. The park has thus been preserved as a free-entry public open space.

The Lickey Hills immediately became popular as a recreation area and attendance numbers exploded between 1924 and 1953 while the tram service connected with the terminus at Rednal. As early as 1919 as many as 20,000 visitors were recorded on a single August Bank Holiday Monday. The current Country Park status was established with the support of the Countryside Commission in 1971 and today the park still hosts over 500,000 visitors a year. It is considered to be one of the most picturesque public spaces of its type in the West Midlands and is Green Flag recognised.

== History ==
The first evidence of people settling in the Lickey Hills date back to the Stone Age when a Neolithic hunter lost a flint arrow head on Rednal Hill. The arrow head is leaf-shaped and made of flint and is certainly over 4,000 years old. Additionally a 3,000-year-old flint javelin point was found lying on the surface by an observant Mr W H Laurie when the Lickey's road-widening was taking place in 1925. A flint scraping tool was found in the area near the Earl of Plymouth monument. The artifacts are on display at the Birmingham Museum.

The Romans constructed a Roman road over the Lickeys very near to the present Rose Hill gap, before it swung north and followed the route of the present day Bristol Road South. The road would have been used to transport salt and other goods between the Roman encampments at Worcester and Metchley, near where Birmingham's Queen Elizabeth Hospital now stands. It would have also been used as a military marching route by Roman soldiers. In 1963 a Roman coin was found near Rednal Hill School by a Janet and Stephen Harris. The coin was a dupondius struck during the reign of the Roman Emperor Antoninus Pius who ruled Rome and Britain from 138 to 161 AD. The tiny coin was struck from brass and would have been worth about the price of a loaf of bread.

In Norman times the Lickeys formed part of the royal manor of Bromsgrove and were set aside as a royal hunting forest. As well as stocking the area with deer, the Normans deliberately introduced rabbits to the area that were kept in large enclosures, or 'warrens' hence the road and place names. The word 'forest' means 'place of deer' and did not necessarily mean that the area was totally covered with trees.

The manor was sold by crown charter in 1682 to the Earl of Plymouth. The Earl lived at nearby Tardebigge and his descendants would own the lands at Longbridge, Rednal, Cofton Hackett and the Lickey Hills for the next 250 years.

In 1888 the Birmingham Society for the Preservation of Open Spaces purchased Rednal Hill and handed it to the City in trust. They also arranged for Pinfield Wood and Bilberry Hill to be leased on a peppercorn (nominal) rent. Birmingham City Council finally purchased Cofton Hill, Lickey Warren and Pinfield Wood outright in 1920. With the eventual purchase of the Rose Hill Estate from the Cadbury family in 1923, free public access was finally restored to the entire hills.

In 1904 Mr and Mrs Barrow Cadbury gave the Lickey Tea Rooms building at the bottom of Rose Hill to the people of Birmingham, as a place of rest and refreshment and it remained open until the late 1960s. The building still stands but is in use as the Bilberry Hill Centre, a hostel and sports facility run by Birmingham Clubs for Young People nestling at the base of Bilberry Hill. The hostel can accommodate up to 65 persons.

For many Birmingham and Black Country people, the Lickey Hills were a traditional day out. When the Birmingham tram network was extended to the Rednal terminus it would carry the crowds from all over the city to the Lickeys. There are records of crowds as far back as the Rose and Crown on busy Sundays, as families queued for the trams to take them home. The terminus and tram tracks were removed in 1953.

== Geography and geology ==
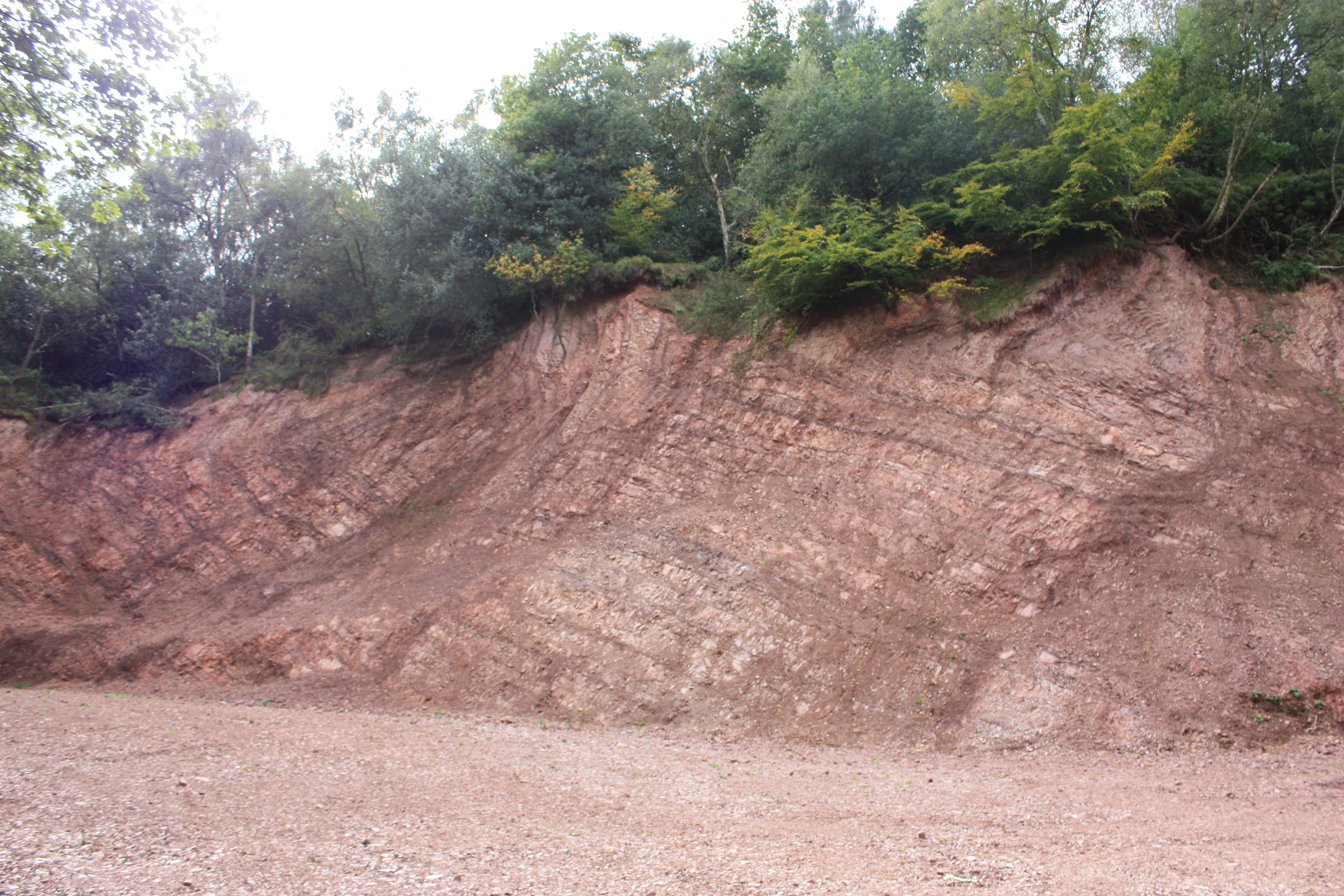
A quarry cutting on Bilberry Hill showing the layers of Lickey Quartzite

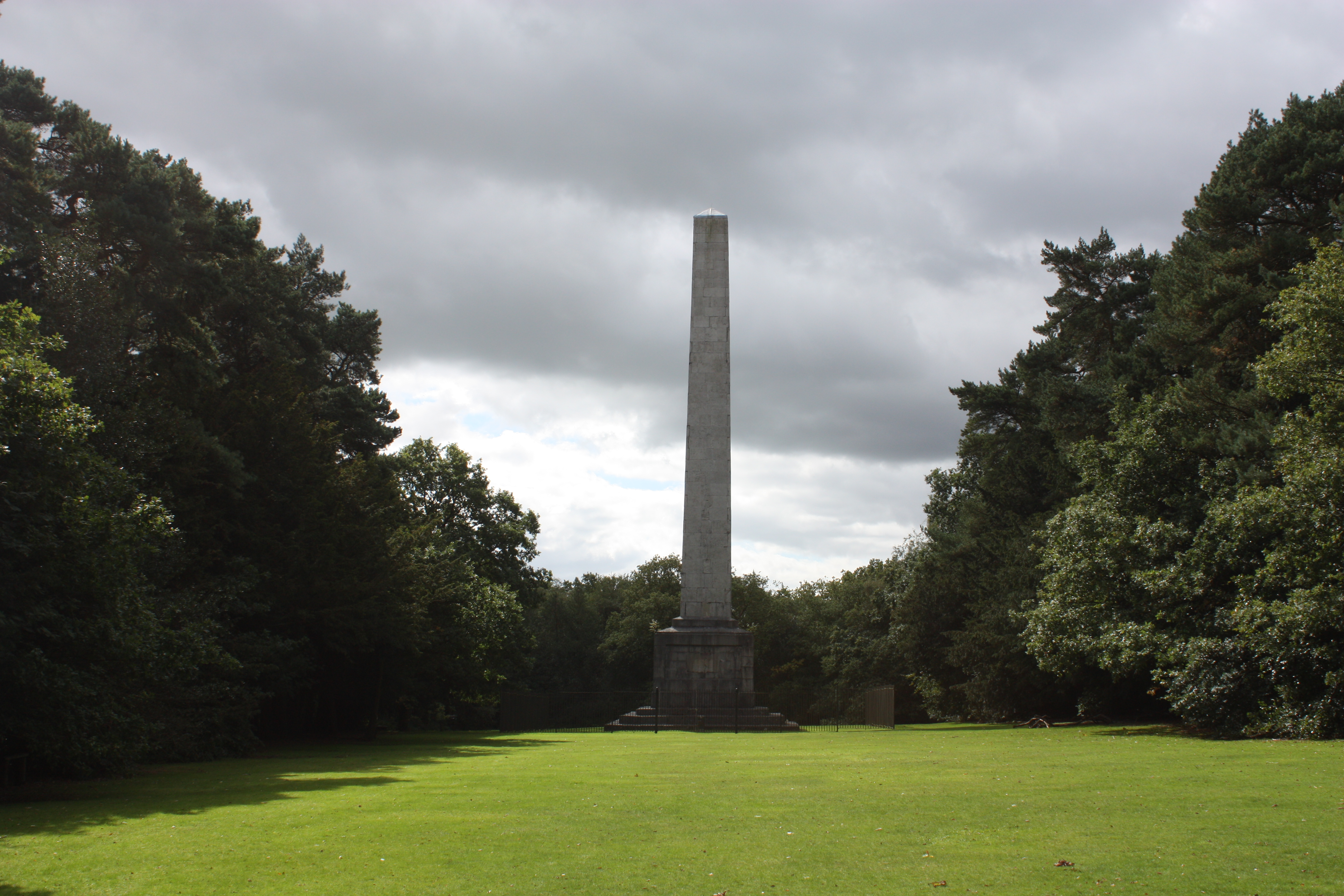
The obelisk on Monument Hill, erected in dedication to Other Windsor, 6th Earl of Plymouth

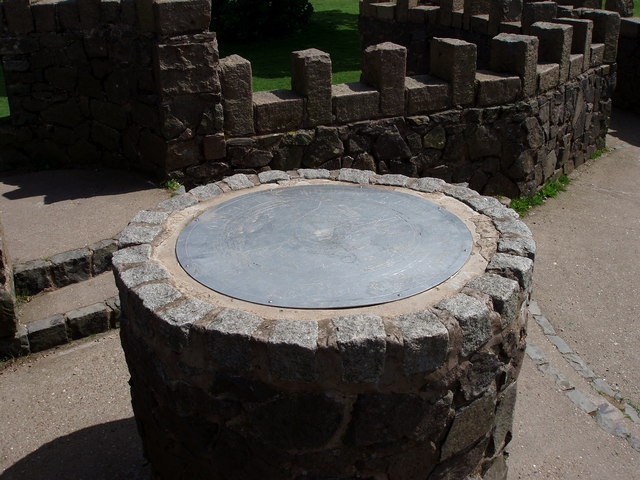
The toposcope on Beacon Hill

The park is situated in the Lickey Hills range, which is part of the Clent and Lickey ridge. The hills, which separate the Longbridge and Cofton Hackett end of Birmingham from Barnt Green and Lickey in rural Worcestershire, are 11 miles south of central Birmingham. The total area of the park is 524 acres (2.12 km^{2}).

The area is of significant geological interest due to the range and age of the rocks. The stratigraphic sequence, which is the basis for the area's diversity of landscape and habitat, comprises:

- Barnt Green rocks – tuffs and volcanic grits, siltstones and mudstones from the Tremadocian stage of the Ordovician
- Lickey Quartzite – an Ordovician quartzite with thin beds of mudstone and possibly tuff
- Rubery sandstone – a fossiliferous sandstone of lower Silurian age (Telychian)
- Halesowen Formation – a Carboniferous mudstone of Westphalian age
- Clent Formation – a breccia of lower Permian age
- Bunter Pebble Beds – beds of Triassic water-worn pebbles

== Obelisk and toposcope ==
On the road from Lickey to Lickey Beacon there is an obelisk folly commemorating Other Archer Windsor, 6th Earl of Plymouth, who created the Worcestershire Yeomanry volunteer regiment of cavalry, which served in the Napoleonic Wars. The obelisk, which is well hidden from the road, is inscribed with the words "To commend to imitation the exemplary private virtues of Other Archer 6th Earl of Plymouth."

Just a kilometre north of the monument, on top of Beacon Hill, is the toposcope made in the early twentieth century by the Cadbury family, standing next to the Ordnance Survey triangulation point. A small castellated structure was built to rehouse the toposcope in 1988 to celebrate the centenary of the park. It is 297 metres above sea level and provides the best views, of the city and surrounding counties, that the park provides.

== Amenities ==
The park includes an 18-hole non-membership golf course, the first such municipal facility in the country which was noted as one of the most difficult municipal golf courses in the country in the 1970s by Tony Jacklin. Also included within the park boundary is a bowling green, tennis and putting green as well as a purpose-built wheelchair pathway and viewing platform allowing easy access to panoramic views over the surrounding countryside.

The visitor centre, which first opened in April 1990, contains an exhibition, leaflets and information on nature trails, guided walks and other activities organised by the Ranger Service. It also has a small café and gift shop. There are three car parks, one for the visitor centre, one by the golf club house and another on the top of Beacon Hill. Also next to the visitor centre are a children's play area and paths for disabled visitors, although these are limited by the steep topography within the park. Between the Bilberry, Beacon and Rednal Hills stands The Rose & Crown hotel and public house which serves meals daily including Sunday lunches.

The Lickey Hills Country Park was awarded a Green Flag Award for seven consecutive years from 2000. A ranger explained in a newspaper interview: "The Green Flag Award is a national scheme which started back in 1996 as a means of recognising and rewarding the best green spaces in the country. They look for a certain standard of quality management within the park, cleanliness, use by the community and so on. There are a total of 27 criteria to pass in order to win the award."

== Flora and fauna ==
There are several deer species and badgers living in the park, together with a range of waterfowl on the lake including Canada geese, mallards, coot, moorhen and mute swans. In spring, there are notable displays of bluebells.

The forests mainly consist of mature spruce and pine trees although there is also a wide-ranging mosaic of deciduous trees on the lower slopes. Bilberry Hill is named after the extensive bilberry bushes that bear fruit in the early to mid autumn and are popular with walkers for the free harvest that is later transformed into jams or bilberry and apple pies.

There are over 380 different species of flowering plant within the park, including 17 species of fern and 30 species of moss. There are a range of woodland invertebrates including insects such as beetles, centipedes and slugs. Together with flies, bees and butterflies, they provide the staple diet for some of the larger wildlife within the park.

Ninety bird species have also been recorded within the park. These include robin, chaffinch, blue tit, great tit, sparrowhawk and common woodpigeon, with common redstarts and tree pipits visiting during the summer and fieldfare and redwing during the winter. Nuthatches are frequently seen on the bird feeders outside the small cafe near the lake.

The damp woodland and the nearby heathland is also home to a variety of reptiles, which include grass snakes, adders and the common lizard. The most evident mammals are the large numbers of grey squirrels throughout the woods and rabbits over the hills, especially during summer evenings. The area is very popular with walkers, families, birdwatchers, other nature lovers and the general public.

== Public transport ==
There is a short to medium walk from all local public transport stops to the main park visitor centre.

Bus

Diamond Worcestershire services 182 and 183 start at Lickey Square and terminate in Redditch. Diamond services 145/145A and National Express West Midlands route X20 from Birmingham City Centre also stop nearby.

Rail

The nearest railway station is Barnt Green, with frequent services on the Birmingham Cross-City line from Bromsgrove/Redditch in the south and the City Centre/Lichfield in the north.

== Notable people ==
In 1904, J. R. R. Tolkien, author of The Hobbit and The Lord of the Rings, moved to Rednal with his mother who was convalescing after an illness. The hills became a favourite haunt of Tolkien's and are thought to be his inspiration for the mythical Shire, where the hobbits lived in his books.

John Henry, Cardinal Newman lived and was buried in the area.

The author Jonathan Coe was born in Lickey in 1961.

== See also ==
- Lickey Incline — Well-known railway incline south of Barnt Green station.
