= Lickey Hills =

Range of hills in Worcestershire

Coordinates: 52.37664°N 2.01024°W

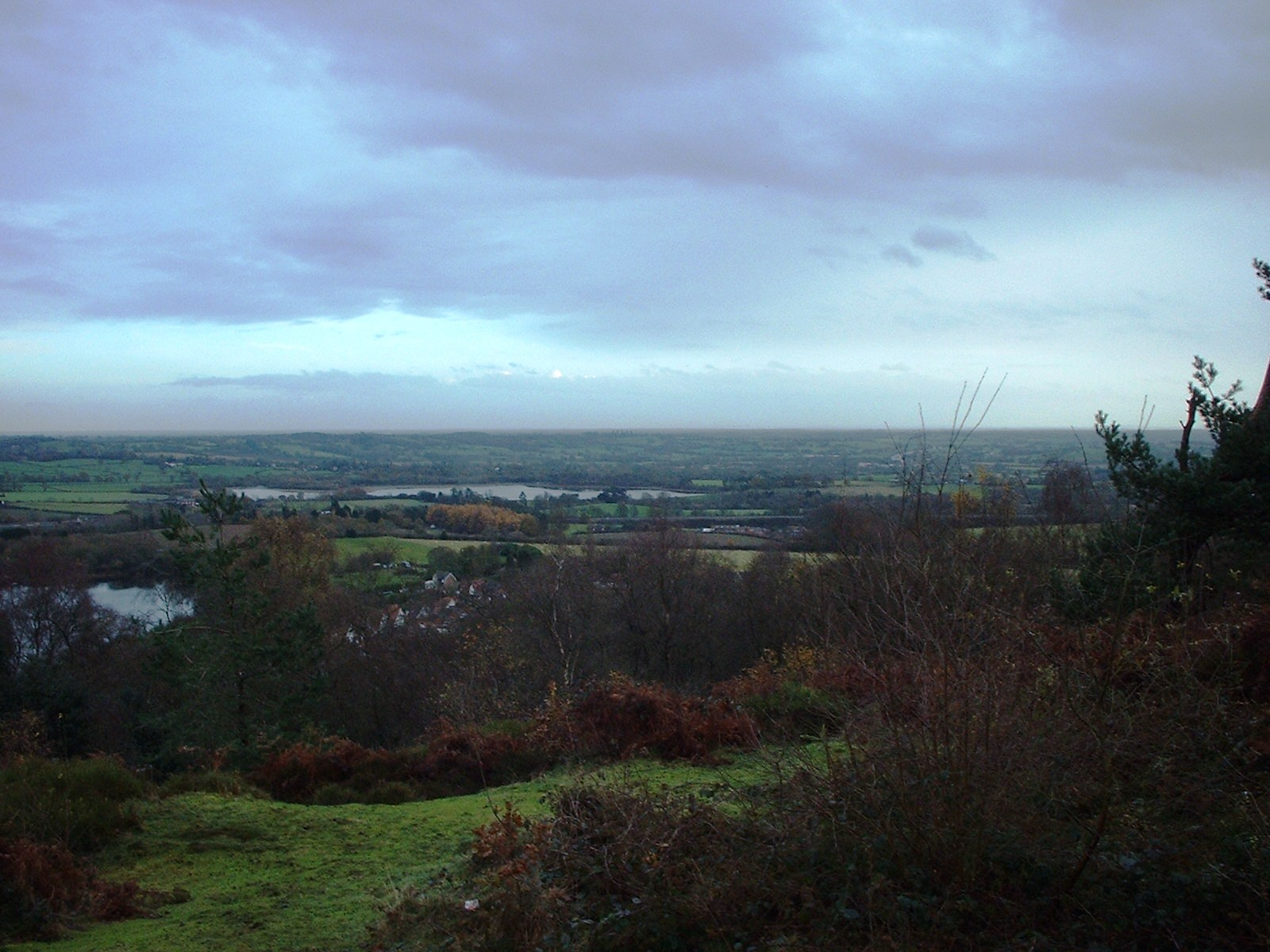
A view from the top of Bilberry Hill

The Lickey Hills (known locally as simply The Lickeys) are a range of hills in Worcestershire, England, 11 miles (18 km) to the south-west of the centre of Birmingham near the villages of Lickey, Cofton Hackett and Barnt Green. The hills are a popular country park area and they afford panoramic views over much of the surrounding countryside.

== Ownership ==
The hills had been a royal hunting reserve belonging to the Manor of Bromsgrove. Free public open access began in 1888 when Rednal Hill was bought by the Birmingham Society for the Preservation of Open Space. The Society then presented it to the City of Birmingham in trust. Pinfield Wood and Bilberry Hill were then leased at a nominal rent. Beacon Hill was bought by Edward, George and Henry Cadbury in 1907 and then gifted to the City of Birmingham. Cofton Hill, Lickey Warren and Pinfield Wood were bought in 1920. The final stage in restoring public access to the area was the purchase of the Rose Hill Estate from the Cadbury family in 1923. Although fully owned and maintained by Birmingham City Council, only a small part of the Lickey Hills Country Park is within its boundary, the rest being in Worcestershire.

== Geography ==
The Lickey Hills consist of two parallel ranges with a valley between. The Lickey Hills Country Park of 525 acres (2 km^{2}) belonging to Birmingham City Council and a golf club covers part of the hills. The lower range, known as the Lickey Ridge, consists of three hard quartzite hilltops, Rednal Hill, Bilberry Hill and Cofton Hill. The higher range consists of Rose Hill, Beacon Hill (298 metres (978 ft)) and Stock Hill.

== Geology ==
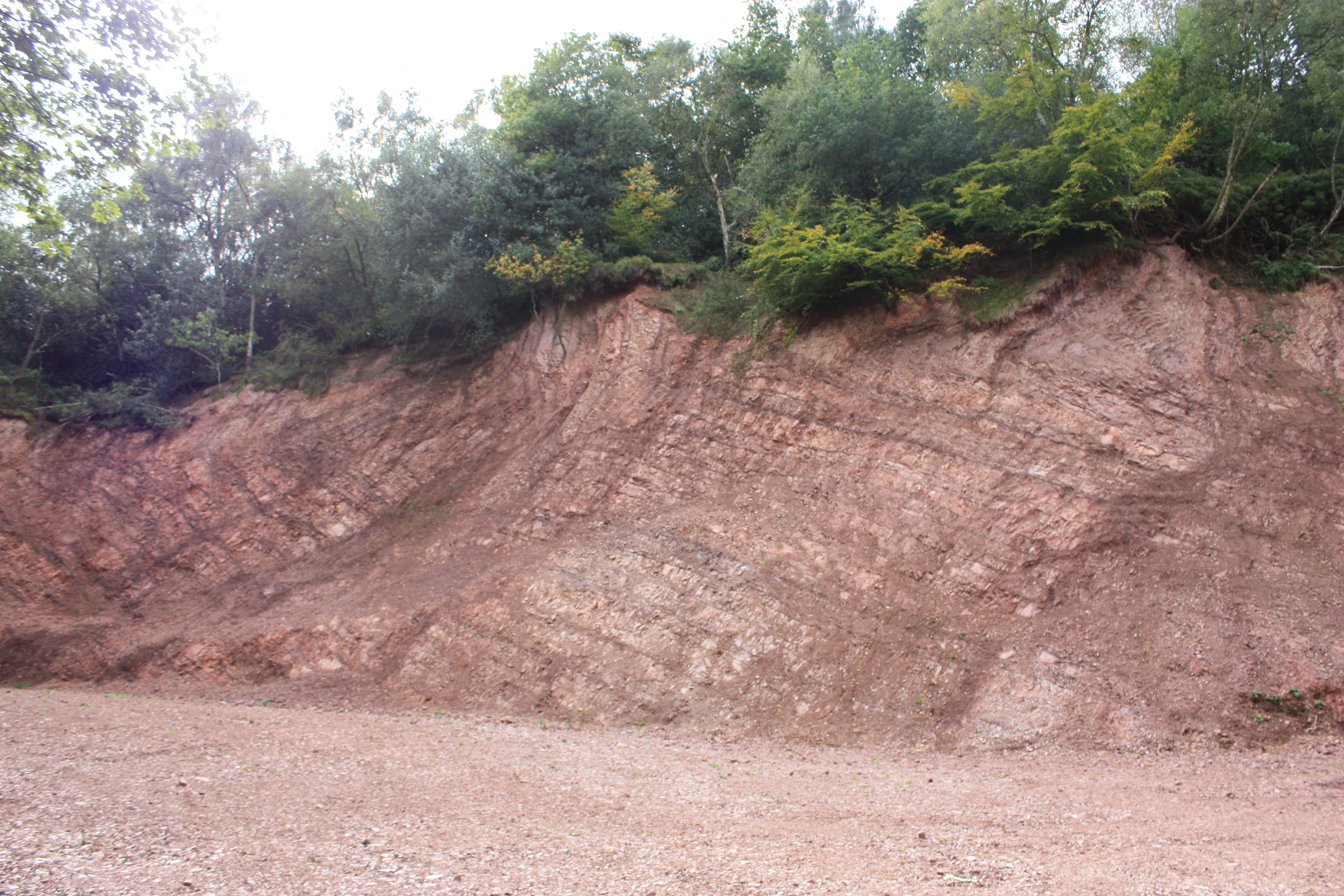
A quarry cutting on Bilberry Hill showing the layers of Lickey Quartzite

The Lickey Hills area includes a wide geological range of rocks of various ages. The stratigraphic sequence, which is the basis for the area's diversity of landscape and habitat, comprises:

- Barnt Green rocks - tuffs and volcanic grits, siltstones and mudstones from the Tremadocian stage of the Ordovician
- Lickey Quartzite - an Ordovician quartzite with thin beds of mudstone and possibly tuff
- Rubery sandstone - a fossiliferous sandstone of lower Silurian age (Telychian)
- Halesowen Formation - a Carboniferous mudstone of Westphalian D age
- Clent Formation - a breccia of lower Permian age
- Bunter Pebble Beds - beds of Triassic water-worn pebbles

The overall structure of the Lickeys Hills is horst of quartzite forming the Lickey Ridge, with the younger sequences downfaulted from it to both east and west.

== Beacon Hill ==
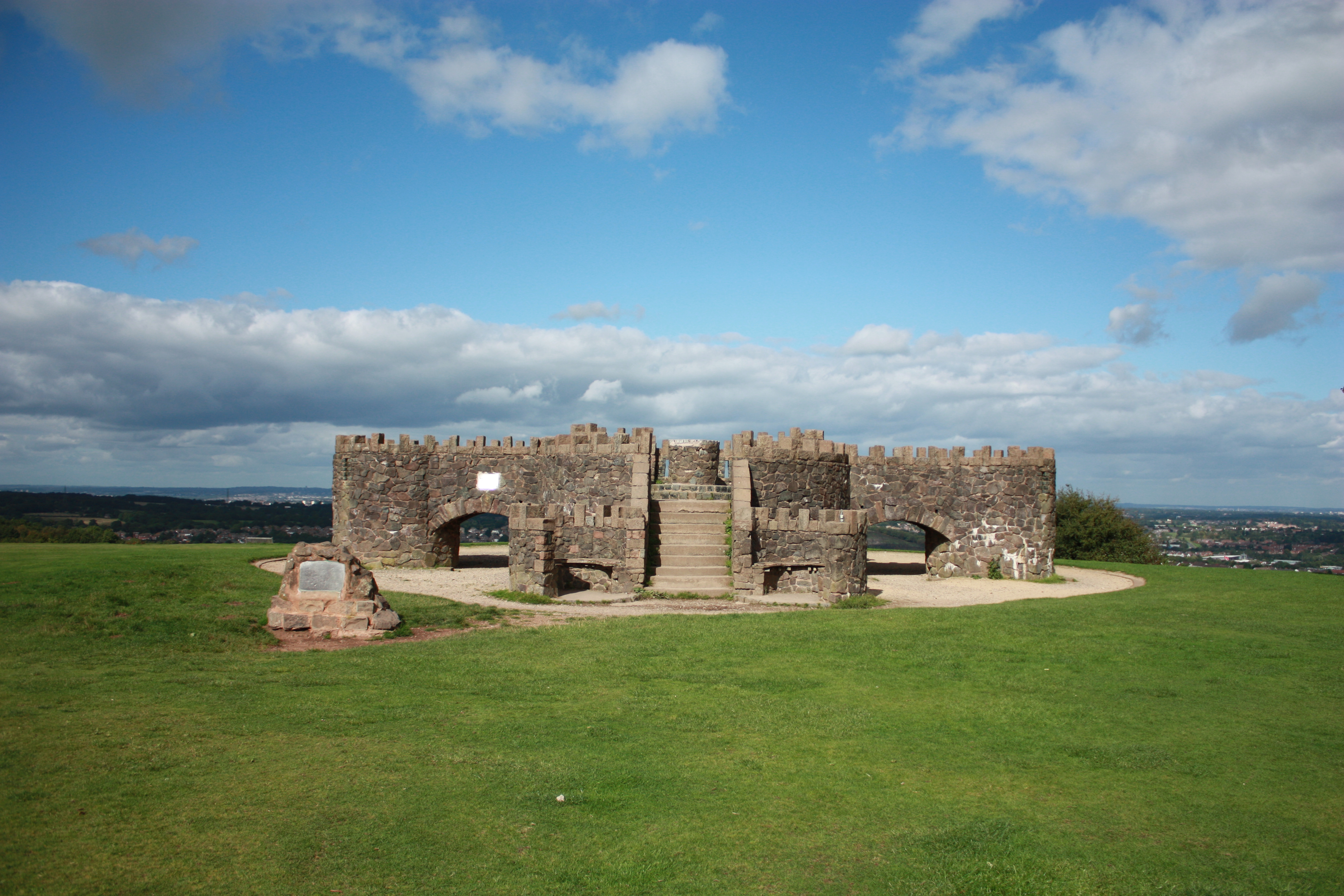
Toposcope on Beacon Hill

On Beacon Hill stood one of the country-wide network of beacons which, before the days of modern communication were used to alert the country to an imminent invasion. A tapestry map woven about the time of the Spanish Armada (1588) shows the huge iron basket on top of Beacon Hill where two men kept watch night and day.

During the Second World War the Army's Royal Engineers built a range of buildings on top of Beacon Hill that were used by Air Raid Wardens, who acted as fire watchers over the south of Birmingham and Royal Observer Corps aircraft spotters who activated the air raid sirens for Rednal, Rubery, Northfield, the Austin motors factory and the Austin Aero aircraft factory at Cofton Hackett. The range of buildings included a dormitory-rest room block and an open topped toilet range. The latter building, the toilet block still painted in army khaki, was located just under the cover of the tree line and remained in use by the public as late as the early 1970s.

During the extremely cold winters that affected the Birmingham area during the 1950s the northern slope of Beacon Hill was frequently covered by snow for several weeks each year and was used daily by hundreds of families for sledging. In recent years milder winters have not produced sufficient snow and the slope has been reduced in scope by housing development and expansion of the Municipal Golfcourse.

Standing on the peak of the hill is a toposcope which was built to commemorate the gift of the land to the City of Birmingham in 1907 by the Cadbury family. The small castle-like structure that houses it was rebuilt in 1988 to celebrate the centenary of the country park. It is 298 metres (978 ft) above sea level, and provides views of the city and stands adjacent to the Ordnance Survey triangulation point.

In the hills there is an obelisk commemorating the sixth Earl of Plymouth (died 1833) as gratitude for his work in forming the Worcestershire Yeomanry volunteer regiment of cavalry.

== Lickey Incline ==
The Lickey Incline runs about 1.5 miles (2.4 km) south of the hills — since 1964 it has been reputedly the steepest sustained adhesion-worked gradient (approximately 2 miles at 1 in 38, steepest grade 1 in 36) on the UK railway system.

== Folklore ==
According to legend, the Devil and his accomplice, named Harry-ca-nab, used to hunt wild boar in the Lickey Hills, mounted on white bulls. See also, the Wild Hunt, Gwyn ap Nudd & Herne the Hunter.
