= Rednal =

Suburb of Birmingham, England

Coordinates: 52.391°N 1.988°W

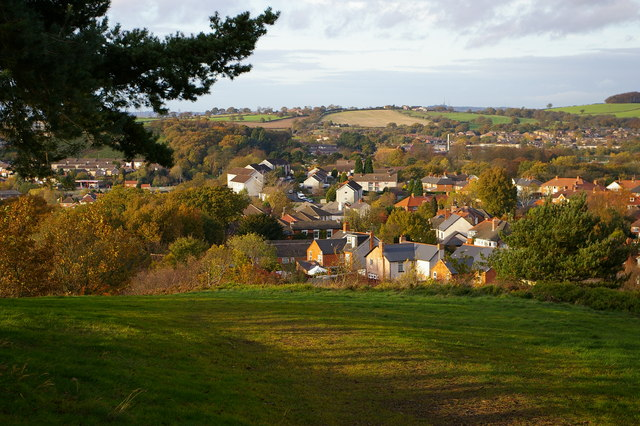
- View from Rednal Hill towards Rubery, with the houses of Rednal in the foreground

- Location within the West Midlands
- Population: 2,000 (2001 Population Census)
  - Density: 34.8/ha (14.1/acre)
- OS grid reference: SP002772
- Metropolitan borough: Birmingham
- Metropolitan county: West Midlands
- Region: West Midlands
- Country: England
- Sovereign state: United Kingdom
- Post town: Birmingham
- Postcode district: B45
- Dialling code: 0121
- Police: West Midlands
- Fire: West Midlands
- Ambulance: West Midlands
- UK Parliament: Birmingham Northfield

Rednal is a residential suburb on the south western edge of metropolitan Birmingham, West Midlands, England, 9 miles (14 kilometres) southwest of Birmingham city centre and forming part of Longbridge parish and electoral ward. Historically it was part of Worcestershire.

Rednal is home to approximately 2,000 residents. The suburb is located in a triangle formed by Rubery and the Bristol Road South to the north and north west, the former MG Rover car factory to the south east and the Lickey Hills and Cofton Hackett Park just south. The popular rural Lickey Hills Country Park is 1/2 mile (800 metres) south of Rednal, with Rednal Hill being the nearest peak.

== History ==
The first evidence of people settling in the area dates back to the Stone Age, when a Neolithic hunter lost a flint arrow head on Rednal Hill. The arrow head is leaf-shaped and made of flint and is certainly over 4000 years old. Additionally a 3000-year-old flint javelin point was found lying on the surface by W. H. Laurie when the Lickey's road was being widened in 1925. A flint-scraping tool was found in the area near the Earl of Plymouth monument. The artefacts are on display at Birmingham Museum and Art Gallery.

The Romans constructed a road over the Lickeys very near to the present Rose Hill gap before it swung north through Rednal and followed the route of the present-day Bristol Road South. The road would have been used to transport salt and other goods between the Roman encampments at Worcester and Metchley, near where Birmingham's Queen Elizabeth Hospital now stands. It would have also been used as a military marching route by Roman soldiers. In 1963, a Roman coin was found near Rednal Hill School by a Janet and Stephen Harris. The coin was a dupondius struck during the reign of Emperor Antoninus Pius, who ruled Rome and Britain from 138 to 161. The tiny coin was struck from brass and would have been worth about the price of a loaf of bread.

In Norman times, Rednal and the Lickeys formed part of the royal manor of Bromsgrove and were set aside as a royal hunting forest. As well as stocking the area with deer, the Normans deliberately introduced rabbits to the area that were kept in large enclosures, or 'warrens', hence the road and place names. The word 'forest' means 'place of deer' and did not necessarily mean that the area was totally covered with trees.

Rednal was known by the Anglo-Saxon name, Wreodan Healh, meaning 'thicket nook'. Together with Kings Norton and other sub-manors, Rednal is listed as Weredeshale in the Domesday Book, a berewick of Bromsgrove belonging to the king. A 20th-century housing estate has reinstated the name of Wreodanhale into modern usage. The name was recorded as early as 849 and is mentioned in the Cofton Lease, one of the few surviving Anglo-Saxon charter documents in the West Midlands. The charter designated land around Cofton Hackett and Rednal to be leased by Bishop Ealhun of Worcester to King Berhtwulf in AD 849.

Running along the west side of Lickey Road, between Leach Green Lane and past Edgewood Road, is a medieval hedge estimated to be over 700 years old. The manor was sold by crown charter in 1682 to the Earl of Plymouth, who lived at nearby Tardebigge, and his descendants would own the lands at Rednal, Longbridge, Cofton Hackett and the Lickey Hills for the next 250 years.

In 1888, the Birmingham Society for the Preservation of Open Spaces purchased Rednal Hill and handed it to the city in trust. It also arranged for Pinfield Wood and Bilberry Hill to be leased on a peppercorn (nominal) rent. Birmingham City Council finally purchased Cofton Hill, Lickey Warren and Pinfield Wood outright in 1920. With the eventual purchase of the Rose Hill Estate from the Cadbury family in 1923, free public access was finally restored to the entire hills.

An early provision for the small rural community was the Rednal Public Library built in 1909 by King's Norton & Northfield Urban District Council on Leach Green Lane. The site was donated by Edward Cadbury and George Cadbury Jnr, and the building costs met by philanthropist, Andrew Carnegie.

In 1917, the Austin Aero Company built an airfield right next to Rednal, just on the other side the Lickey Road and north east of Cofton Hackett Park. The airfield was used for flying aeroplanes out of the Cofton Hackett aircraft factory. Between 1939 and 1945, the factory produced mainly Hawker Hurricane fighters, Short Stirling four-engined bombers that were flown out over Rednal.

In 1924, the Birmingham tram system was extended along the central reservation of the Bristol Road South to the new Rednal Terminus, with a branch to Rubery. The new line drew thousands of visitors from the city and all over the Black Country to Rednal and the Lickeys at weekends and on bank holidays. There are records of crowds as far back as the Rose and Crown up Rose Hill on busy Sundays, as families queued for the trams to take them home. The trams were removed when the trams were replaced by buses in 1953, but the terminus turning circle and its extensive waiting shelter remained in situ until well into the 1960s, and it is believed that they continued to be used by the buses on bank holidays. The original tram station offices are now used as a Chinese restaurant. A small development of retirement homes and a carpark were built on the site of the terminus, but several short lengths of tramlines are still visible on front gardens and pathways.

In preparation for the Second World War, deep shelter tunnels were dug alongside Rednal in 1936 to accommodate up to 15,000 people. The main tunnels were under the South Works and were also driven under the Flying Ground through the sandstone towards the Cofton Hackett aircraft factory, a task undertaken by an army of mining engineers. The tunnels were large enough to admit 3-ton lorries. The tunnels under the South Works were intended to be used mainly in air raids, but some machine tools were installed, allowing work to continue. The tunnels under the airfield and the Cofton factory were designed for use during the assembling of aero engines and even aircraft, but they also contained a St John's Ambulance Station, staffed by first aid qualified factory workers. Used in later years for moving partially-completed cars around the site, the tunnels still exist under the demolished factories.

Major housing development in Rednal did not begin until after the war, with the construction of the Rednal Hall council estate, where over 600 houses added.

== Governance ==
During the medieval period Rednal formed part of the yields of nearby Kings Norton.

For elections to the House of Commons, Rednal forms part of the Birmingham Northfield constituency, which is represented by Labour MP Laurence Turner.

Rednal is part of Rubery and Rednal Ward, and as of 2026 is represented on Birmingham City Council by Rebecca Waters of Reform UK.

== Geography ==
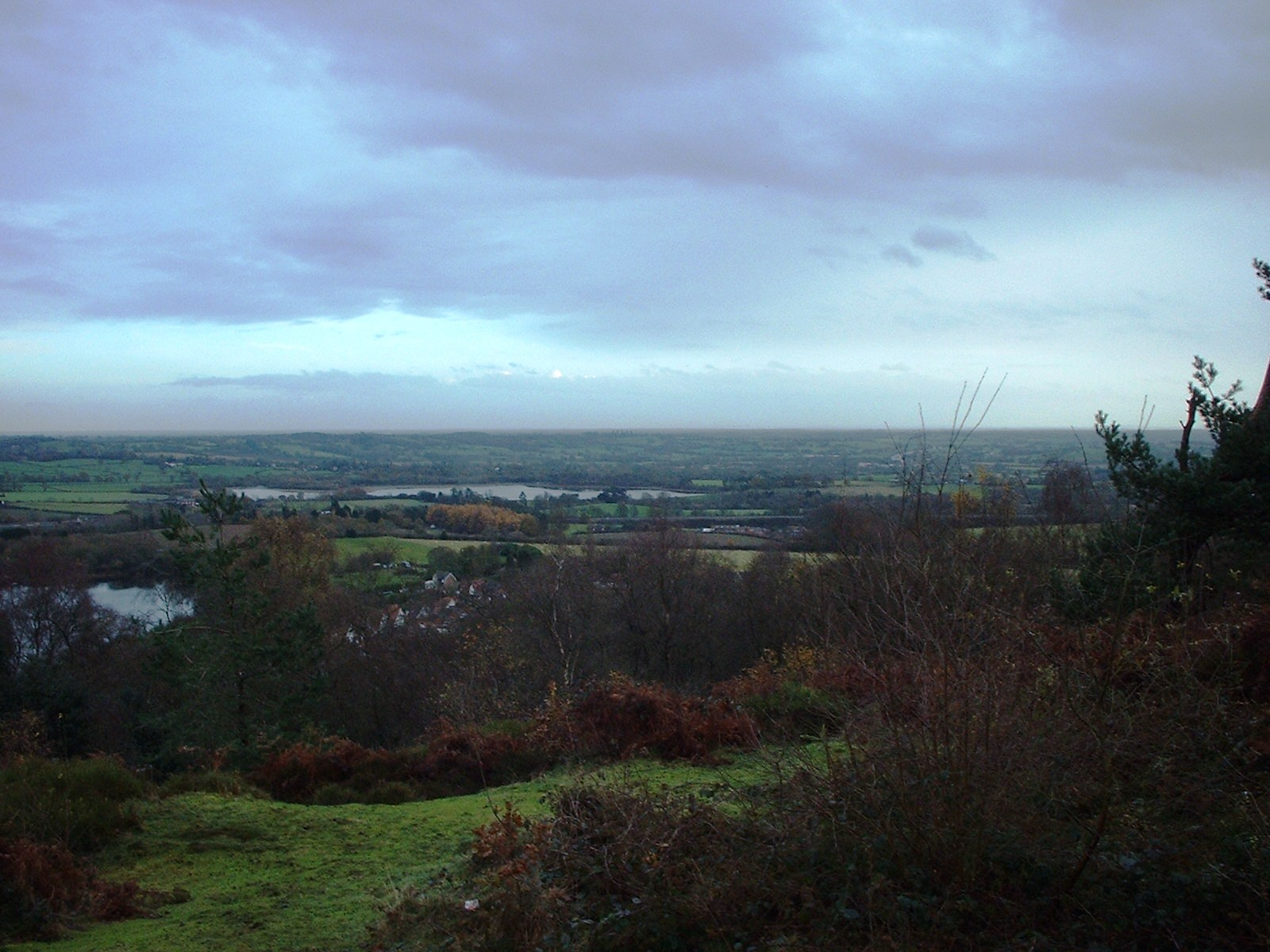
View over Cofton Hackett village and the reservoirs, from Bilberry Hill

The village nestles at the feet of the three hilltops geographically comprising The Lickeys – Rednal Hill, Bilberry Hill and Cofton Hill – are the summits of the Lickey Ridge, a formation of hard quartzite. Panoramic views over the city of Birmingham and surrounding countryside can be seen from the top of these hills.

The Lickey Hills area is of significant geological interest due to the range and age of the rocks. The stratigraphic sequence, which is the basis for the area's diversity of landscape and habitat, comprises:

- Barnt Green rocks – Precambrian tuffs and volcanic grits
- Lickey Quartzite – a Cambrian quartzite
- Keele Clay – a Carboniferous clay
- Clent Breccia – a Permian breccia
- Bunter Pebble Beds – beds of Triassic water-worn pebbles

== Economy ==
With the demise of the Longbridge motor factory there is little in the way of major employment in the immediate area. Rednal barely existed prior to the factory, coming into being in its current form as a result of four events. Firstly the opening of the Austin motor works at Longbridge in 1905, secondly the extension of the area of the City of Birmingham to the northern boundary of Cofton Hackett in 1911. Thirdly the break-up of the Earl of Plymouth's estate by auction in 1919, and lastly the extension of the Birmingham tramlines to the Rednal terminus in 1924.

These events had carried Rednal rapidly from the rural age of the horse and cart to that of the motor car and bus, and from a community depending chiefly on farming to a dormitory for people whom mainly now commute into central Birmingham. Most of the shops are in an area on the southern edge of the village that was administratively transferred from Kings Norton only in 1911.

The previous MG Rover site was purchased by St Modwen and discussions since 2006 have taken place between residents, county, district and parish councils, West Midlands Development Agency and central government officials on suitable development plans for the site. The 2008 downturn in the worldwide economy has slowed the progression of any new development. Situated where the Bristol Road meets Longbridge Lane, the Longbridge Technology Park was completed in late 2007; in 2008 one of the two buildings is occupied but the other is still vacant.

A major development aimed to improve the Longbridge ward was the Great Park development in Rubery by Corporate Land Developments Ltd. The 200-acre (80-hectare) site just off junction 4 on the M5 Motorway has been developed into a community with offices, houses, industrial units, Empire Cinemas, Hollywood Bowl, Premier Inn, Brewers Fayre, Morrisons, Gala Bingo, Greens Fitness and an area of public open space.

Rednal is also now the home of the NASUWT, the UK's largest teachers' union. Their premises, which includes training rooms and accommodation, is at Hillscourt, close to the Lickey Hills footpaths.

== Education ==
Most primary aged children attend St. Columba's Catholic Primary School, Rednal Hill Infant or Junior Schools, Colmers Farm Infant or Junior Schools or St. James Catholic Primary School. St Columba's Catholic Primary School is a Catholic school with Christ's teachings of love, peace and justice at the heart of all they do.

Most older children attend either Colmers School or St Thomas Aquinas Catholic School, Kings Norton.

== Religious sites ==
The Anglican church of St Stephen's on Edgewood Road was built to serve the community of Rednal and dedicated in 1951. It was granted its own parish from parts of Rubery parish in 1957. The original building was designed as both church and parish hall, however, a new church hall was constructed in 1961. The 450 pipe organ was moved from St John's Methodist Church in Selly Oak in 1960 by a group of volunteers led by St Stephen's organist G. A. W. Jeynes. The church has recently constructed a website to boost its outreach into the Rednal area, and also to encourage communication from the community to the church.

The Catholic church, Our Lady of Perpetual Succour, is on Leach Green Lane.

Longbridge Methodist Church is on Bristol Road South.

== Notable people ==
- John Henry, Cardinal Newman was buried in the small Roman Catholic cemetery at Rednal, by the Oratory country house. Father Ambrose St John, his companion of 32 years, also buried at Rednal in the same grave.
- The scholar and author of The Hobbit and The Lord of the Rings, J. R. R. Tolkien lived at Fern Cottage in Rednal at the age of 12, when his mother died there in 1904. The young Tolkien walked widely on the hills of the Lickeys with his brother and later recalled:
  When I think of my mother's death ... worn out with persecution, poverty, and, largely consequent, disease, in the effort to hand on to us small boys the faith, and remember the tiny bedroom she shared with us in rented rooms in a postman's cottage at Rednal, where she died alone, too ill for viaticum, I find it very hard and bitter, when my children stray away.
  Later in his youth he and his younger brother often stayed at 'The Retreat' with Father Francis, a large retreat house with grounds in Rednal, maintained by the Birmingham Oratory on the rural edge of the city.
- In his novel The Rotters' Club, author Jonathan Coe uses 1970s southwest Birmingham as a background, including scenes set in and around Rednal, and in particular in Cofton Park; and a major plot line takes place at the Longbridge motor works.
- Rick Price, guitarist in The Move and Wizzard, grew up in Rednal and went to Colmers Farm Secondary School.
