= Cofton Hackett =

Village and civil parish in England

Coordinates: 52.380°N 1.997°W

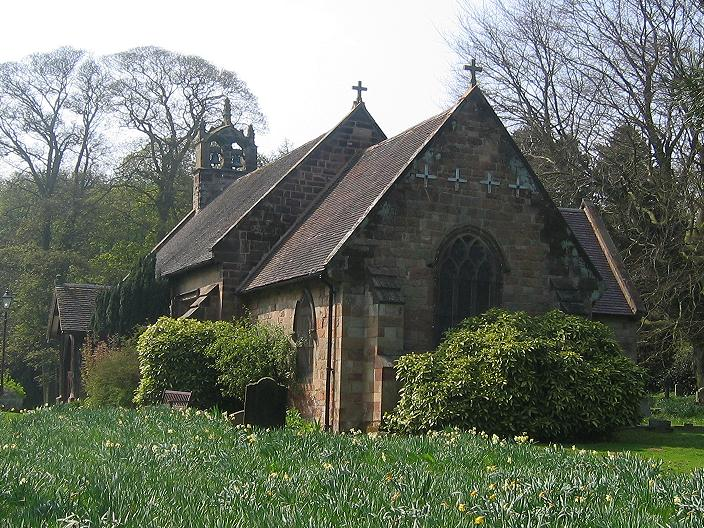
- Cofton Church of St Michael built c. 1330, November 2005

- Location within Worcestershire
- Population: 1,893 (2011)
- OS grid reference: SP010750
- Civil parish: Cofton Hackett
- District: Bromsgrove
- Shire county: Worcestershire
- Region: West Midlands
- Country: England
- Sovereign state: United Kingdom
- Post town: BIRMINGHAM
- Postcode district: B45
- Dialling code: 0121
- Police: West Mercia
- Fire: Hereford and Worcester
- Ambulance: West Midlands
- UK Parliament: Bromsgrove

Cofton Hackett is a village and civil parish in the Bromsgrove District of north east Worcestershire, England. It is 10 1/4 miles (16.5 kilometres) southwest of the city centre of Birmingham and 16 miles (26 km) northeast of Worcester. In 2011, the village had a population of 1,893 but with housing development on the former Austin Rover site, this is expected to double over the five years to 2023.

The village is served by the 145/145A bus service between Longbridge and Droitwich/Wychbold, operated by Diamond Bus. The former 20A bus services, from Cofton Hackett to the Queen Elizabeth Hospital was withdrawn in June 2025.

== History ==
=== Early history ===
Cofton Hackett is an ancient settlement mentioned in historical documents dating back to 780 AD. Coſtune (Costune) was among places granted by King Offa to the minster of St Peter, Bredon in 780. The bounds for this estate probably covered the parishes of Alvechurch and Cofton.

The spelling of the name has varied over the centuries: for many centuries, the usual spelling was Coston. However, the old form of the letter "S" in the middle of words, ‹ ſ ›, was only at some point in the last hundred years misread as a lower case "F", thus turning ‹Coſton› (Coston) into the present-day ‹Cofton›. William de Haket is known to have held ‹Coſa› (Cosa) in 1166. His family name was later added to ‹coſa tun›, which in Anglo-Saxon meant 'cosy farm'. In modern parlance the word 'cove' has a similar derivation and is generally used to describe a sheltered coastal feature, but equally referred to any sheltered spot. The name of the manor transformed over the centuries into Coston Hackett and is usually recorded as such from the 11th century and well into the early 20th. The final permanent change to Cofton appears to have taken place sometime between 1913 and 1930 based on direct comparisons between the Ordnance Survey maps of those dates.

Historically, Cofton Hackett was part of the upper division of Halfshire Hundred that also contained Bromsgrove, Dodderhill, Doverdale, Droitwich, Elmbridge, Feckenham, Hadsor, Hampton Lovett, Kington, Kings Norton, Northfield, Salwarpe, Tardebigge and Upton Warren.

Cofton contained two manors, Cofton Hackett and Cofton Richards. The latter (now only a farm) belonged successively to the Costons (until c.1300), but passed to Lucy wife of Alexander de Hodington by 1327. It was held by her heirs by 1428, John Walsingham apparently being its lord. It remained in his family until William Child, the lord of Coston Hackett, bought it before 1594. Coston Hackett passed down the Hacket family the late 13th century, when it passed by marriage to Robert Leicester.

In 1409 it is recorded that Ralph Ardern granted land at a Crofton Hackett to a John Richards.

Coston Hackett belonged to John Walsingham's descendants until after the death of William Leicester in 1525, who left it to his nephew John More. The manor was then divided among his daughters. A major share was settled in 1573 on James Dineley, whose daughter Mary married John Child. They sold the manor in 1594 to Edward Skinner of Ledbury, clothier, on whose death in 1633 it passed to his son-in-law Thomas Joliffe, a favourite of Charles I, who accompanied him to the scaffold. His descendant another Thomas Joliffe died childless in 1758, leaving his estate to his niece Rebecca Lowe for life and then to Michael Biddulph, who inherited it in 1791. His grandson sold it in 1812 to Other Windsor, 6th Earl of Plymouth.

The oldest buildings in the village are the church and the late 14th century Cofton Hall. King Charles I spent the night of 14 May 1645 at Cofton Hall as guest of his devoted supporter Thomas Jolliffe. The following day, before marching to Chester on 15 May, the Royalist soldiers set the Hall ablaze to prevent it falling into the hands of the Parliamentarian Army. St Michael and All Angels' Church, Cofton Hackett is located on Cofton Church Lane. A church may have existed on the site in the 12th century, as a "chapel" at Cofton is mentioned in a Papal Bull of 1182. The present building certainly dates back to the 14th century and was probably built in 1330 by Robert de Leycester as a chapel for the Manor House. It was a chapel annexed to Northfield until 1866.

=== 20th-century development ===
Between 1917 and the early 1960s Cofton Hackett was the location of the Austin Aero Company's aircraft factory that produced military aircraft during both World Wars and civilian aircraft during the inter-war years.

Cofton Hackett's largest structure was the now demolished aircraft factory, known as the Longbridge East Works, that produced both aero engines and complete military aircraft during both the First World War and Second World War. To allow the aircraft to be flown out of Cofton after production, an airfield was built in 1917 and used in both world wars. It was designed with four crossing tarmac runways allowing aircraft to take off in any direction. The Cofton Hackett factory constructed over 3,000 aircraft during the war years and thousands of engines and wings for other marques of aircraft. After the war, the factory was converted for the production of military vehicles by Austin, who had won a contract for the production of the 1/4 ton truck from the War Department's CombaT (CT) range of vehicles, popularly known as the Austin Champ. Production of some 13,750 vehicles took place between September 1951 – May 1956. The factory closed in the 1960s. A new engine assembly plant was constructed in its place to build E-Series Engines and transmissions for the Austin Maxi. With the demise of the Rover group in the 1990s the land is to be developed for housing.

With new employment opportunities at the Austin works, expansion took place in the late 1930s on the northern edge of the hamlet close to the boundary with Cofton Park which became the major centre of population. With the village spread over several separate locations the actual centre of Cofton Hackett is no longer clearly defined. The old tram terminus and the newsagent's, the Post Office in Parsonage Drive, and the village hall all have central importance.

Cofton Hackett developed from the opening of the Austin motor works at Longbridge in 1905 and most of the shops are on the northern edge of the village that was transferred from Kings Norton to Cofton Hackett in 1911 together the extension of the City of Birmingham to the northern boundary of the village. The transfer of parts of Rednal to Cofton parish and the breakup of the Earl of Plymouth's estate released more land for development in 1919, and the extension of the Birmingham tramlines to the Rednal terminus in 1924 placed it within commuting distance from the city. With the closing of the Longbridge Motor Factory employment opportunities in the immediate area were reduced and the village is now reverting to its former rural character from before the modernisations of the 20th century.

== Governance ==
Cofton Hackett falls within the Bromsgrove constituency, which is represented by Bradley Thomas (Conservative) since 2024. The Bromsgrove District ward of Cofton is represented by Anita Dale (Conservative). The Worcestershire County Division of Beacon is represented by Peter Turner (Reform UK) since 2025.

== Geography ==
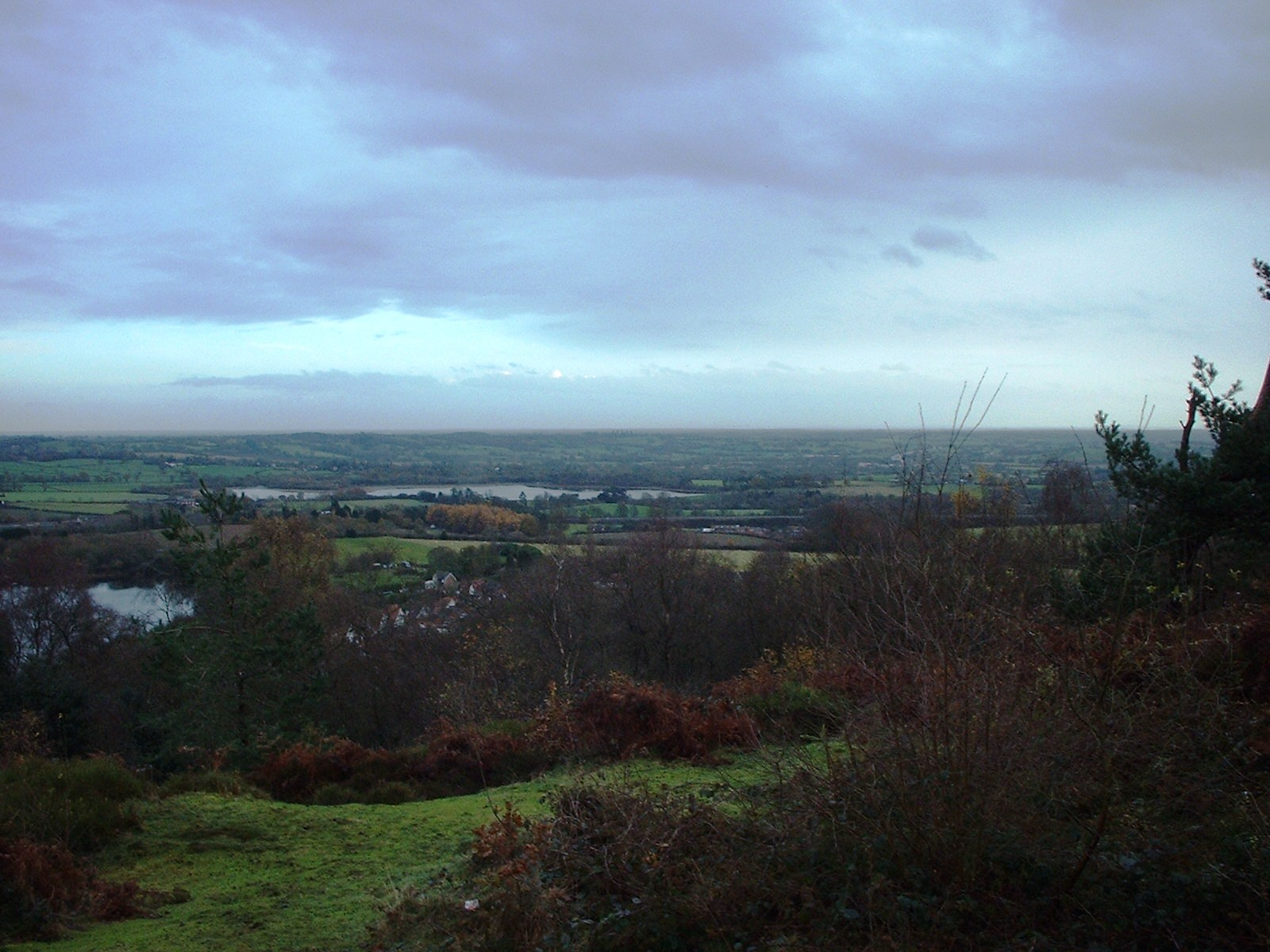
View over Cofton Hackett village and the reservoirs, from Bilberry Hill

The village nestles at the feet of the three hilltops geographically comprising The Lickeys – Rednal Hill, Bilberry Hill and Cofton Hill – are the summits of the Lickey Ridge, a formation of hard quartzite which gives a good view of Birmingham.

The Lickey Hills Country Park is one-half mile (0.80 km) west of the village with Bilberry Hill the nearest peak.

== Landmarks ==
The Upper Bittell reservoir, a flooded gravel pit and a feeder of the Worcester and Birmingham Canal, is partly in Cofton parish, and there is also a smaller reservoir which lies to the east of Bilberry Hill and from which the water is conveyed by the little River Arrow to the Lower Bittell reservoir in Alvechurch parish.

A monument to 6th Earl of Plymouth (who owned extensive lands at nearby Tardebigge), in the form of an 80 ft (24 m) obelisk, is situated behind the trees bordering the old Birmingham road directly opposite the petrol station in Lickey. The inscription reads:

To commend to imitation the exemplary private virtues of Other Archer 6th Earl of Plymouth

The Lickey Hills Country Park was preserved as a public open space between 1887 and 1933 by the generosity of a number of public-spirited persons, including T. Grosvenor Lee, Ivor Windsor-Clive, 2nd Earl of Plymouth, and several members of the Cadbury family. In 1919 it was recorded that as many as 20,000 visitors to the hills had been counted on an August Bank Holiday. The current country park was established with the support of the Countryside Commission.

== Public services ==
Most children in the village attend the nearby Lickey Hills Primary School in Lickey. The school provides nursery and primary facilities for approximately 440 children aged between 3 and 11. Following their primary education most local children move on to Waseley Hills High School in adjacent Rubery. St Thomas Aquinas Catholic School is also attended by some of the local children.

Cofton Hackett had a youth club which had reopened since being closed in 1951, and young people also meet at West Heath Village Hall, where they can participate in regular activities including drama, sports and reading, and attend talks by visiting speakers.

== Notable people ==
- King Charles I stayed overnight in the village during the English Civil War.
- Jonathan Coe's novel The Rotters' Club has scenes set in Cofton Hackett.
- Pope Benedict XVI said mass for the beatification of Cardinal Newman in Cofton Park on 19 September 2010 during his Papal visit to the United Kingdom.
