= Bilberry Hill =

Hill in Worcestershire, England

Coordinates: 52.37664°N 2.01024°W

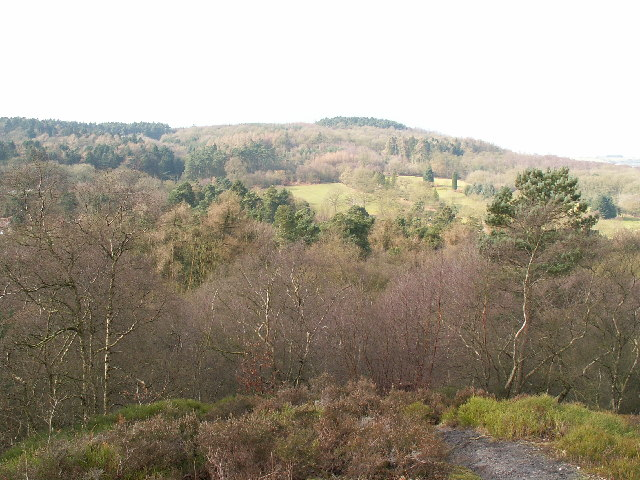
- A view from Bilberry Hill over Rosehill Road and the Birmingham Municipal Golf Course towards Beacon Hill. Bilberry bushes can be seen in the foreground.

Highest point
- Elevation: 260 m (850 ft)
- Prominence: 116 m (381 ft)

Geography
- Location: Worcestershire, UK
- Parent range: Lickey Hills

Bilberry Hill is one of the Lickey Hills in northern Worcestershire, England, 10.3 miles (16.6 kilometres) southwest of Birmingham and 24 miles (39 kilometres) northeast of Worcester. It stands above and to the west of the village of Cofton Hackett, and is part of the Lickey Hills Country Park.

The three hilltops comprising The Lickeys—Bilberry Hill, Rednal Hill and Cofton Hill—form the northern extremity of the Lickey Ridge, a formation of hard quartzite. Views over Birmingham and the surrounding countryside can be seen from the top of these hills.

The hill is named after the tracts of Bilberry (Vaccinium myrtillus) bushes that cover the hill, between the pathways. Local people have been cropping the bushes of their fruit each autumn for hundreds of years to make jams, preserves or apple and bilberry pies.

== History ==
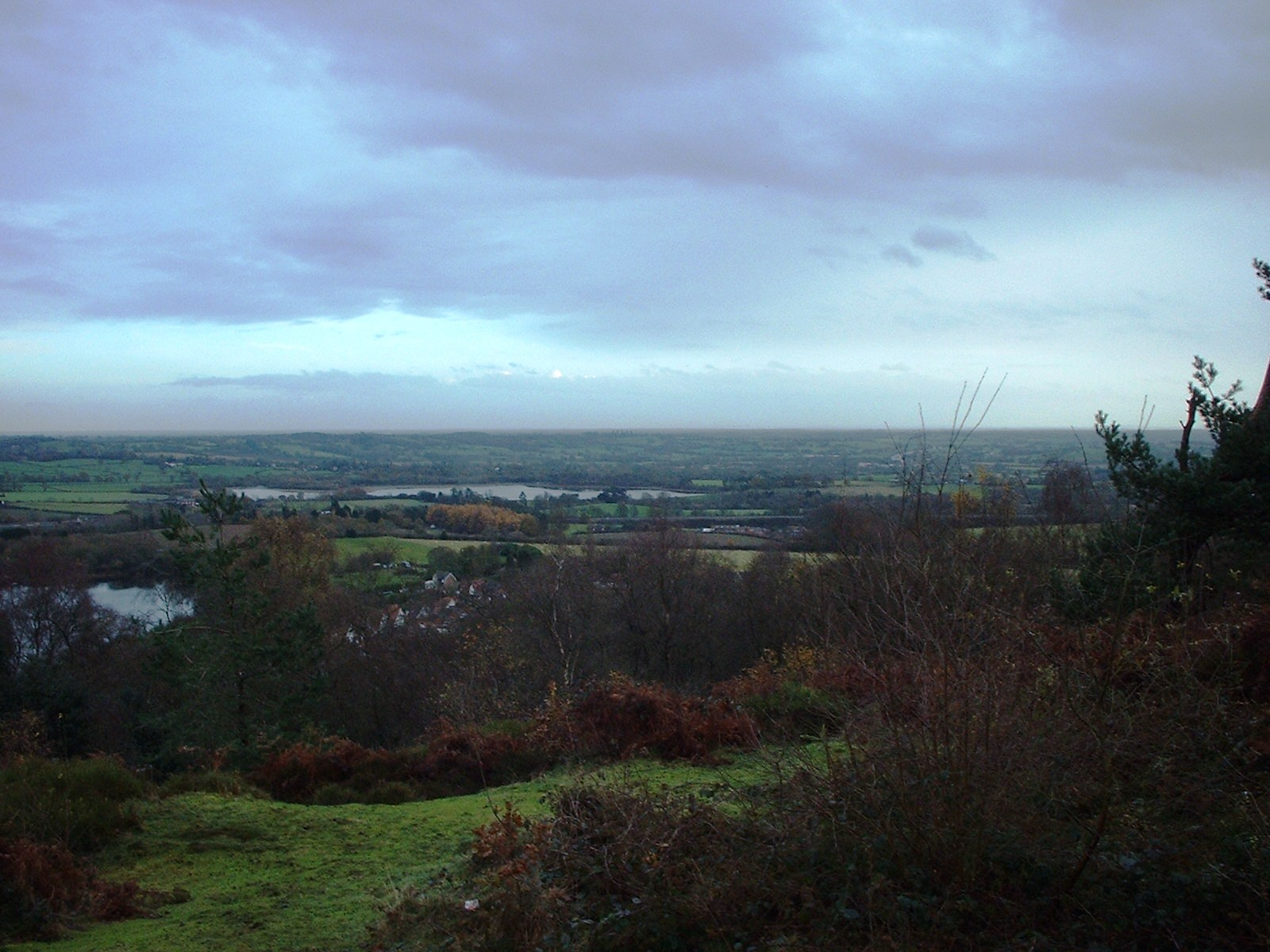
View from Bilberry Hill looking East over Cofton Hackett village and the reservoirs

In 1888, the Birmingham Society for the Preservation of Open Spaces purchased Rednal Hill and handed it to the City in trust. In 1913, they also arranged for Bilberry Hill and Pinfold Wood to be leased to the city on a nominal peppercorn rent in perpetuity. Birmingham City Council finally purchased Cofton Hill, Lickey Warren and Pinfield Wood outright in 1920. With the eventual purchase of the Rose Hill Estate from the Cadbury family in 1923, free public access was finally restored to the entire hills with what would become the Lickey Hills Country Park in 1971.

The Bilberry Hill Centre was a hostel and sports facility run by Birmingham Clubs for Young People and nestling at the base of Bilberry Hill. The building was donated to the people of Birmingham by Mr. and Mrs. Barrow Cadbury in 1904 as the Lickey Tea Rooms and remained in use as a restaurant until the early 1960s. The hostel can accommodate up to 65 persons. In the winter of 2008, the centre was under threat of imminent closure over funding issues, and there was an internet campaign to save the facility for future use by young people. It remained in operation until 2019, when the Birmingham Federation of Clubs for Young People went into administration. The Birmingham City Council has owned the site since, which is currently derelict. In 2022, the Cofton Hackett Parish Council held two public meetings to decide the future of the site.

== Geology ==
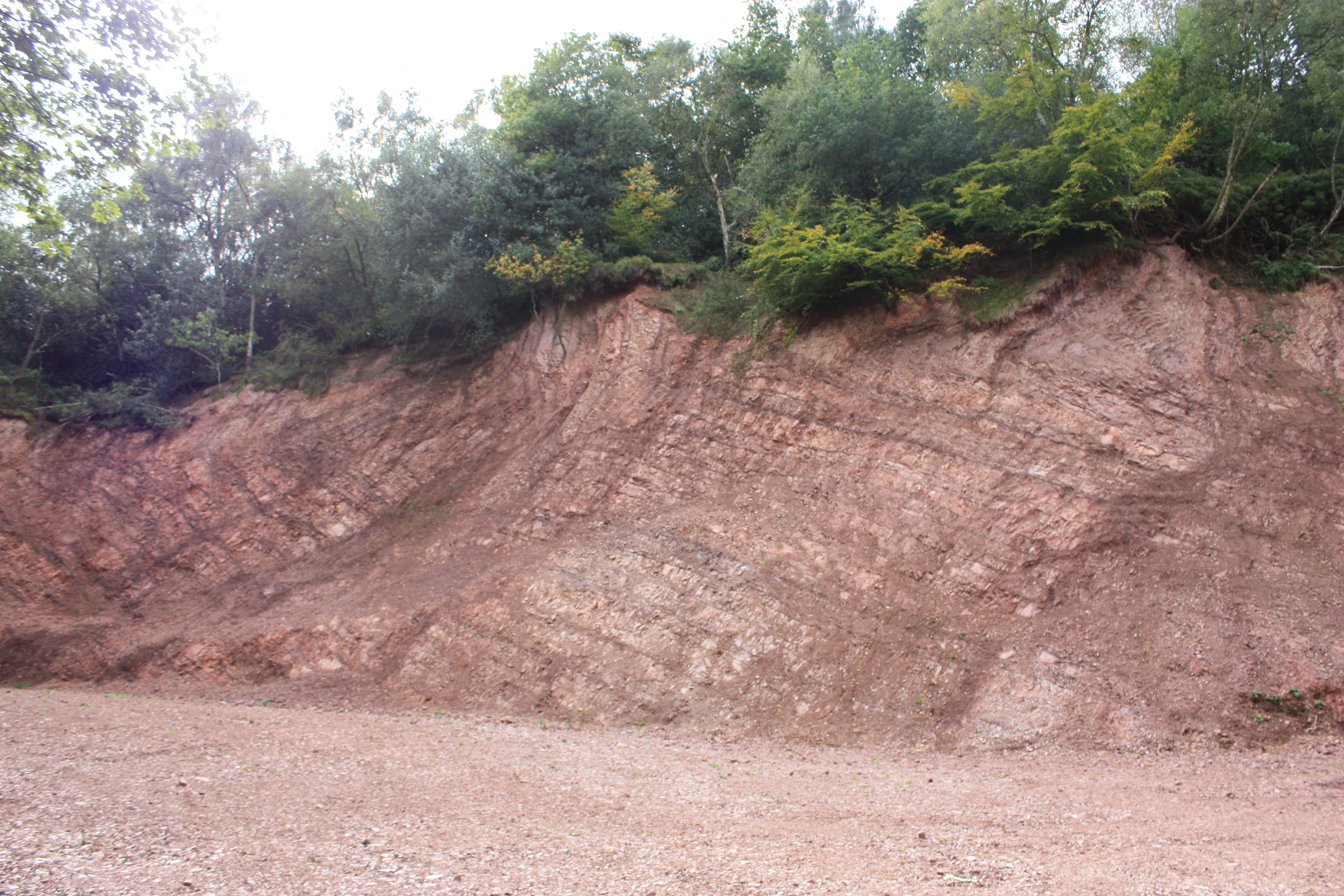
A quarry cutting on Bilberry Hill through the Lickey Quartzite.

The Lickey Hills area is of significant geological interest due to the range and age of the rocks. The darker quartzite making up Bilberry Hill shows signs of having been deposited as sand at the bottom of a shallow sea. The stratigraphic sequence, which is the basis for the area's diversity of landscape and habitat, comprises:

- Barnt Green rocks - tuffs and volcanic grits siltstones and mudstones from the Tremadocian stage of the Ordovician
- Lickey Quartzite - an Ordovician quartzite with thin beds of mudstone and possibly tuff
- Halesowen Formation - a Carboniferous mudstone of Westphalian D age
- Clent Formation - a breccia of lower Permian age
- Bunter Pebble Beds - beds of Triassic water-worn pebbles

The quary that was on Bilberry Hill cut into rocks dating from the Ordovician period of geological time, around 488 million years ago; the rocks are known to geologists as the Lickey Quartzite Formation. The soil is marl and the subsoil gravel, sand and clay. There is a small quarry where Wenlock limestone was worked at the time of the making of the Worcester and Birmingham Canal, and there are some gravel-pits.

== See also ==
- Lickey Incline
- Margaret Mabey, A Little History of the Lickey Hills, The Lickey Hills Society, 1993, ISBN 0-9519839-1-1
- Around Rubery and The Lickey Hills compiled by Martin Hampson. From the Images of England Series published by Tempus Publishing Limited 2000. ISBN 0-7524-2097-6
