= Drumont =

Mountain summit in the Vosges

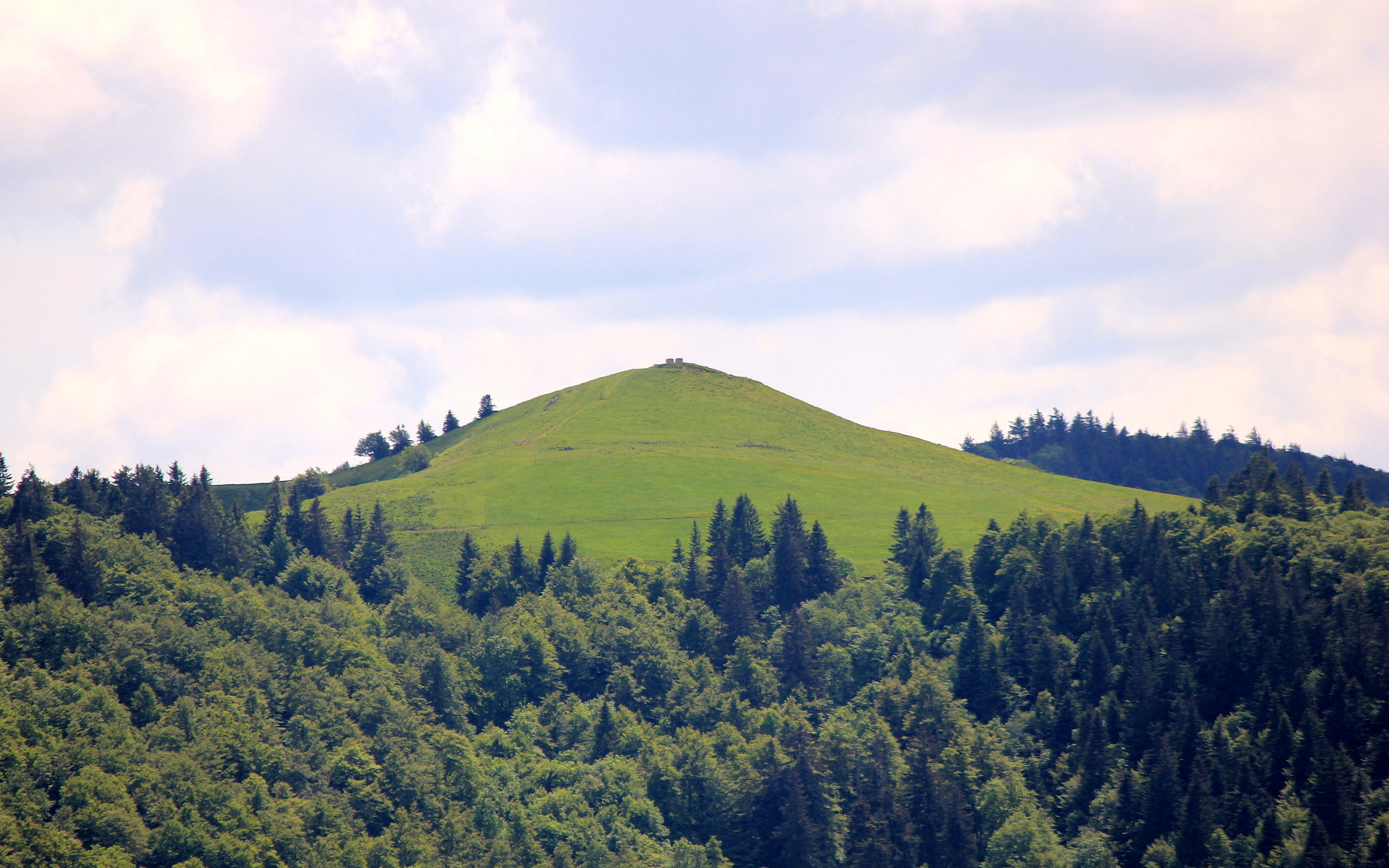
- The Drumont

Highest point
- Elevation: 1,200 m (3,900 ft)
- Coordinates: 47°54′09″N 6°55′00″E

Geography
- Location within France
- Location: Bussang, Vosges; France
- Parent range: Vosges Mountains

The Drumont (German: Trumenkopf) is a summit of the Vosges Mountains located in the commune of Bussang, in the Vosges department of eastern France. Rising to an elevation of 1,200 metres (3,900 ft), the summit is largely cleared of forest and features an orientation table offering a remarkable panoramic view.

== Access ==
From the Bussang Pass, a 5 kilometres (3 mi) road provides access to the summit. The road is not cleared of snow during winter.

== History ==
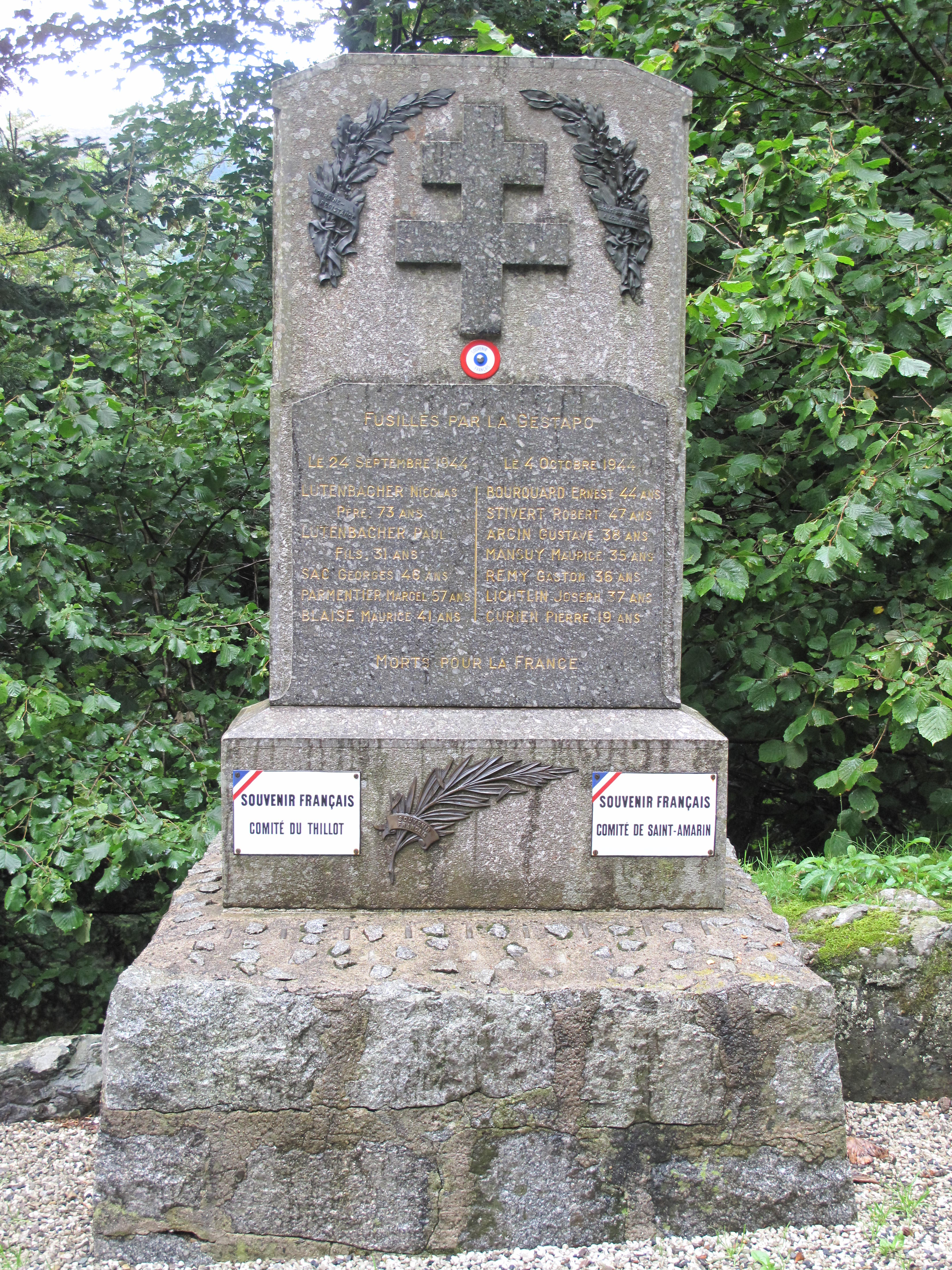
Steingraben memorial commemorating resistance fighters executed by the Gestapo in September and October 1944.

During the Second World War, the Drumont became an important centre of the French Resistance. Nicolas Lutenbacher, a mountain farmer at the Drumont farm inn, and his sons acted as guides for escape routes and intelligence agents.

The farm was used several times as a meeting place for leaders of Alsatian and Vosges resistance networks. On September 21, 1944, Nicolas Lutenbacher, members of his family, and other resistance fighters were arrested by the Gestapo, which burned down the farm.

Five resistance fighters were executed on September 24, 1944, at Steingraben, below the col de Bussang, and their bodies were abandoned in a stream. On October 8, 1944, eight other resistance fighters were shot at the same location, one of whom survived.

Four memorials commemorate these events in the Drumont area.

== Activities ==
The summit of the Drumont is used by aeromodelling enthusiasts and is also a paragliding take-off site, allowing flights towards the commune of Urbès.

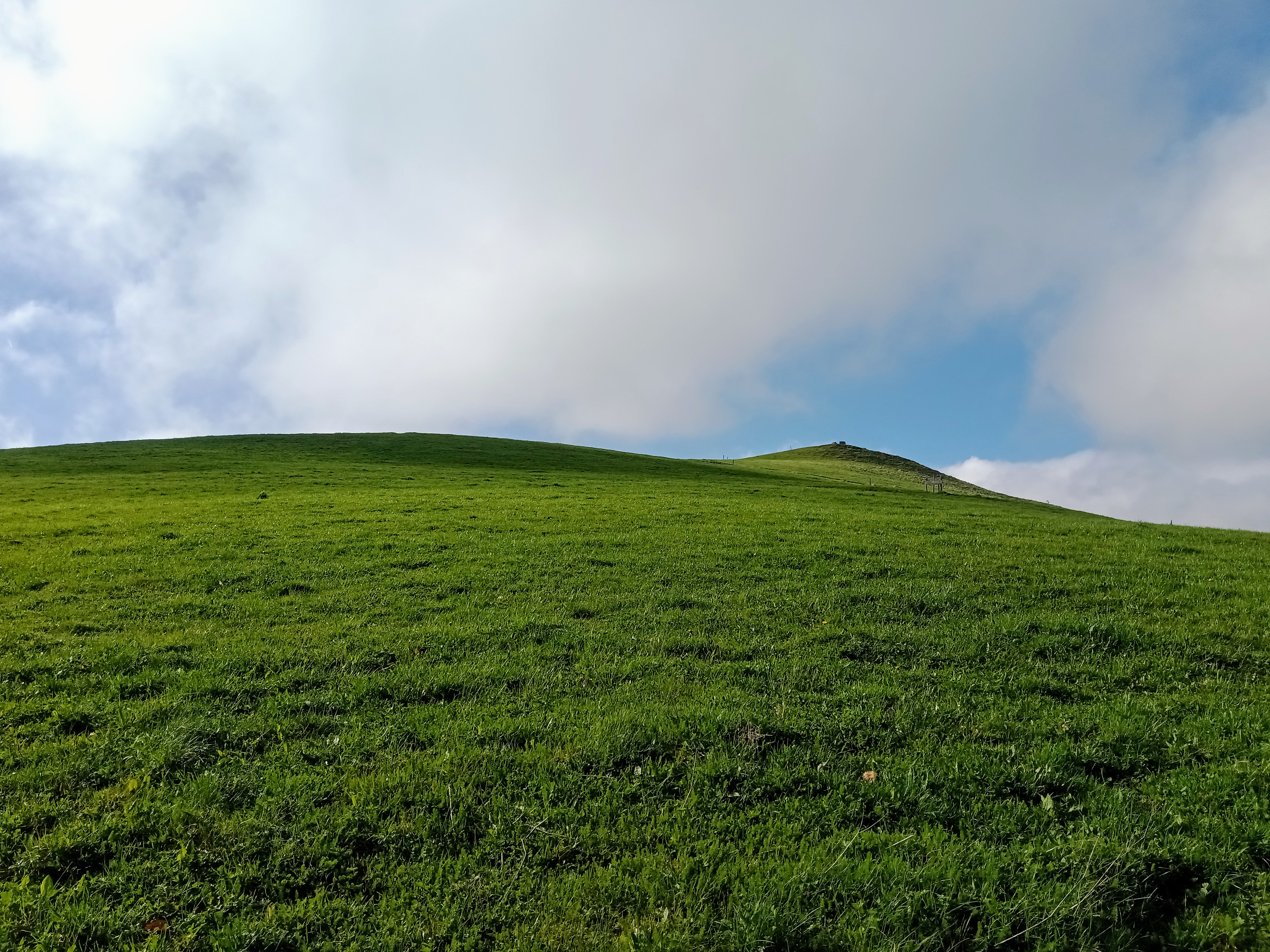
The Drumont mountain pasture.

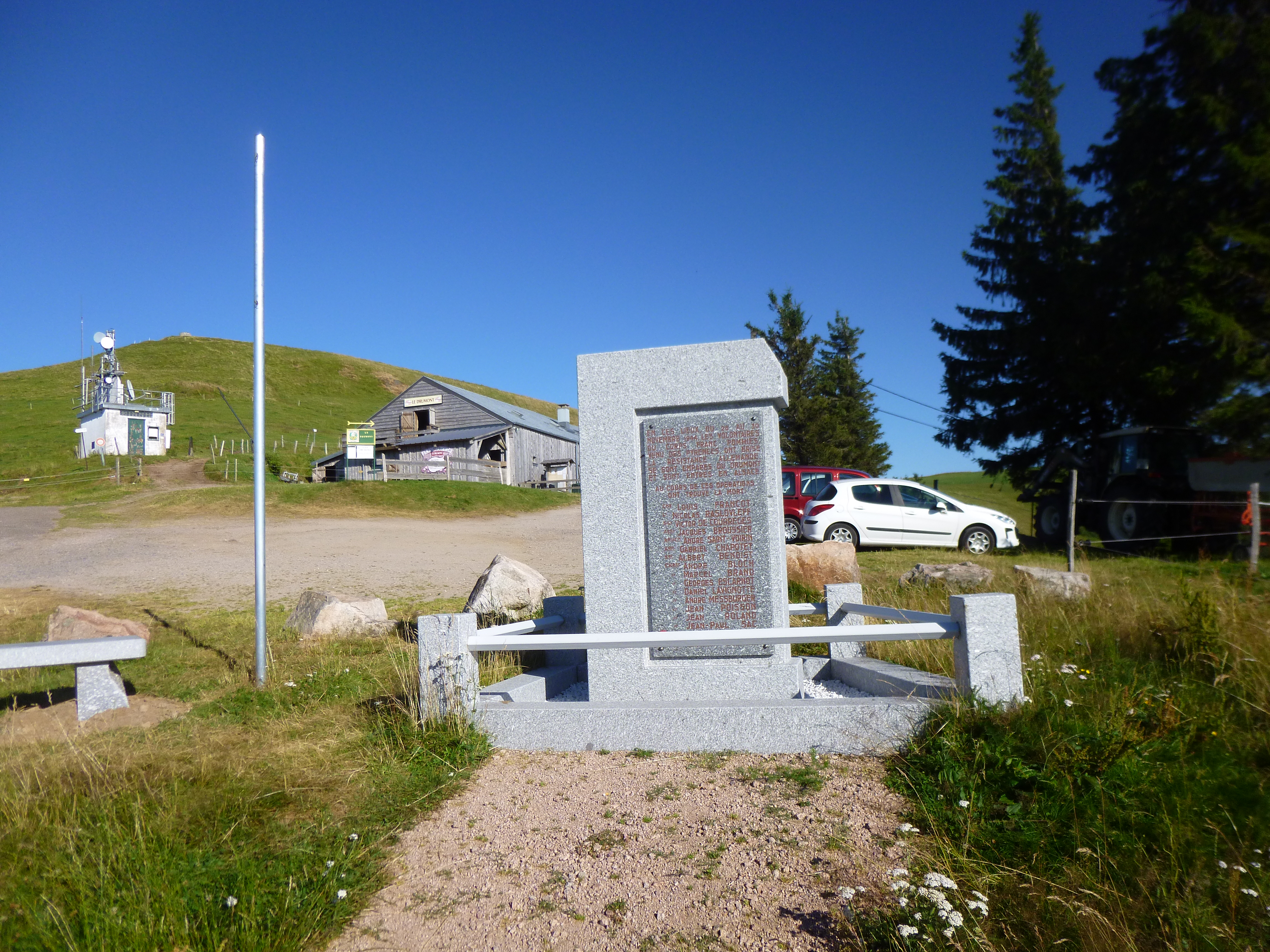
Monument commemorating soldiers of the Corps franc Pommiès killed during the recapture of the Drumont on November 30, 1944.

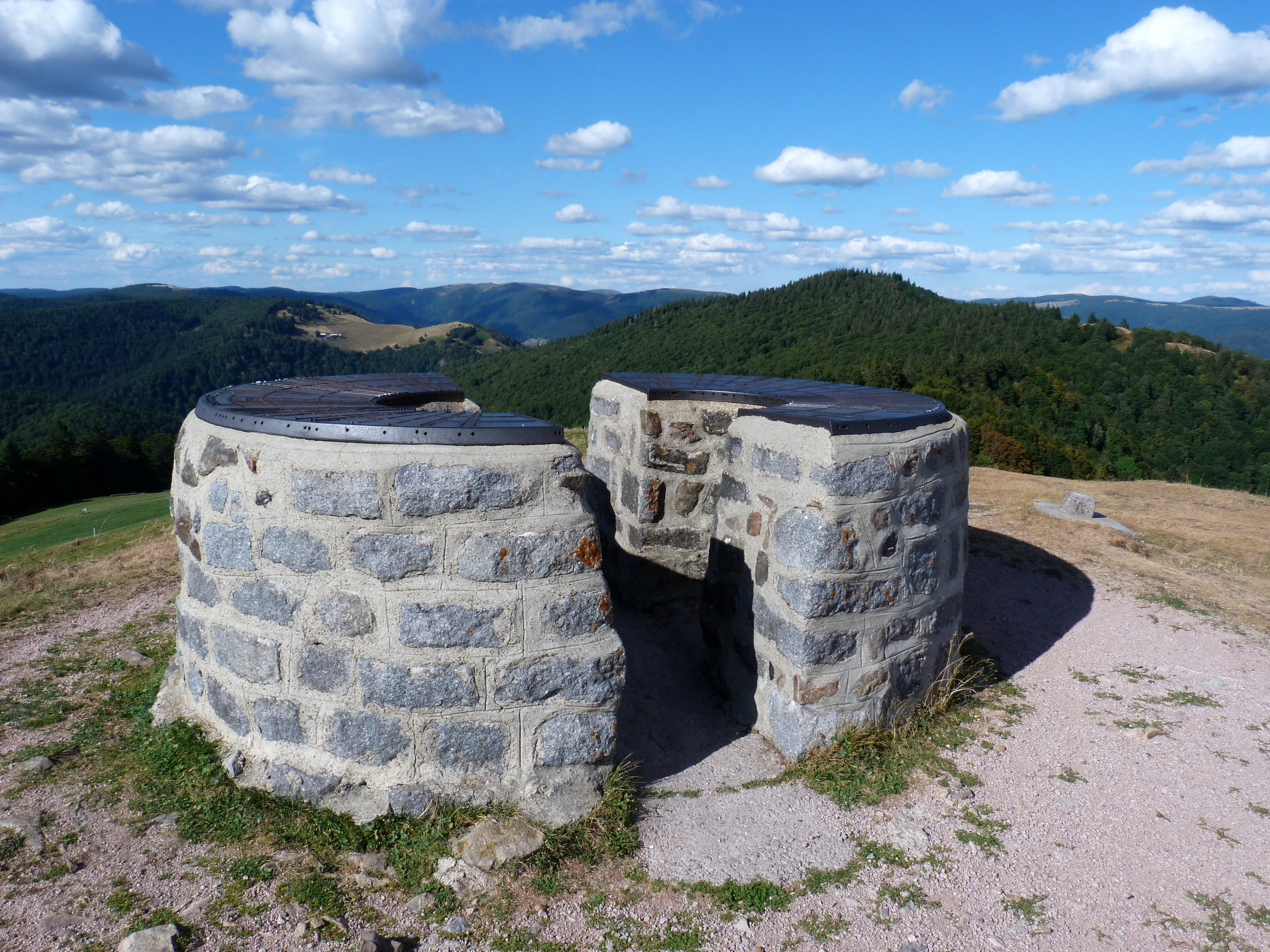
The Drumont orientation table at 1,200 metres (3,900 ft).

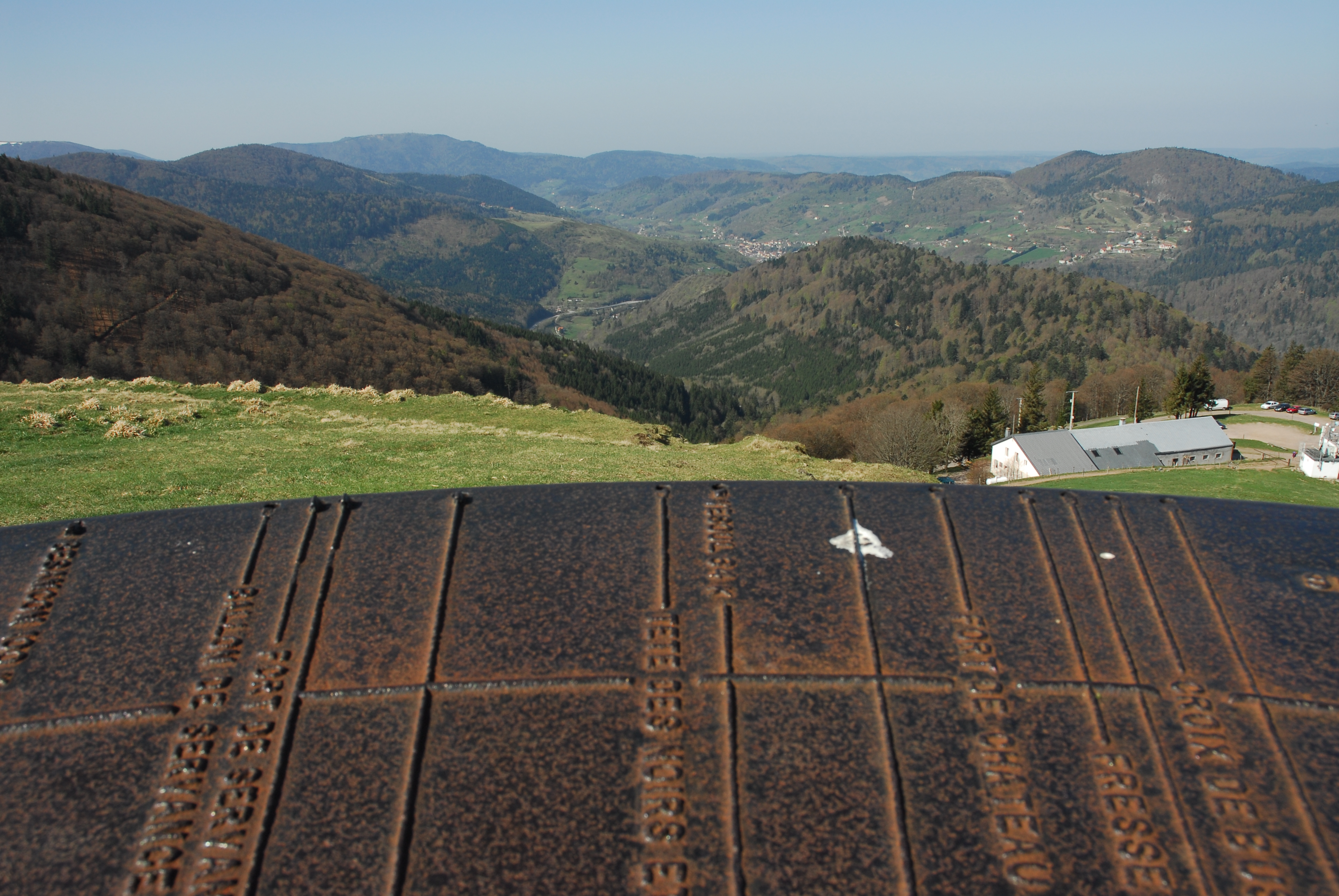
The farm inn below the summit.

== See also ==
- Vosges Mountains
