= Lickey =

Coordinates: 52.37304°N 2.00289°W

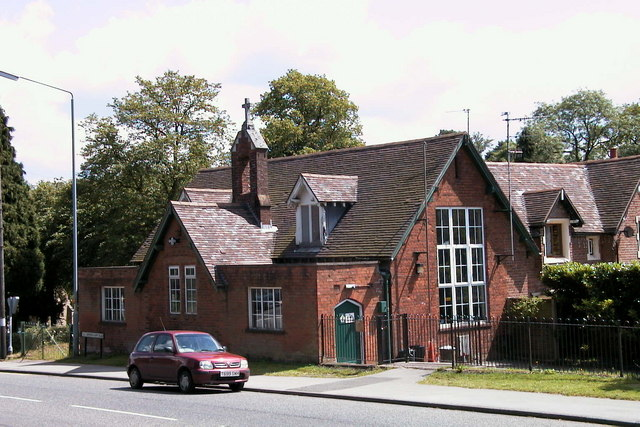
- The old school house is now used as a residence.

- Location within Worcestershire
- Population: 4,201 (2021)
- OS grid reference: SO999752
- Civil parish: Lickey and Blackwell
- District: Bromsgrove
- Shire county: Worcestershire
- Region: West Midlands
- Country: England
- Sovereign state: United Kingdom
- Post town: BIRMINGHAM
- Postcode district: B45
- Dialling code: 0121
- UK Parliament: Bromsgrove

Lickey is a "linear development" in the north of Worcestershire, England approximately 10 miles (16 km) south west from the centre of Birmingham. It lies in Bromsgrove District and is situated on the Lickey Ridge, amongst the Lickey Hills, its proximity to countryside and the city makes it a popular commuter area. The civil parish of Lickey and Blackwell had a population of 4,201 in 2021.

The name of Lickey dating back to 1225 is thought to have derived from 'leac' (a clearing) and 'hey' (an enclosed space), including perhaps referring to a clearing in the forest. Various names have included La Lecheye, La Lekeheye, Lechay, Lekhaye. The area forms part of the Lickey Hills Country Park which covers 524 acres.

== People ==
The Birmingham-born watercolourist Elijah Walton (1832–1880) lived at Beacon Farm in Lickey towards the end of his life, and died there in 1880. The area was populated rapidly from the 1870s onwards by professionals and industrialists such as Herbert Austin, who moved to Lickey Grange in 1910 and lived there until his death in 1941. He is buried in the graveyard of the local church of Holy Trinity. The First World War fighter ace Oliver Bryson was born in Lickey on 18 August 1896. The author Jonathan Coe was born in Lickey in 1961. Today the area has a mainly professional and entrepreneurial population.

== Landmarks ==
Opposite Holy Trinity Church, Lickey is a drinking trough for horses and drinking fountain for travellers.

The Monument, a 60–80 ft tall obelisk, is situated behind the trees bordering the old Birmingham road directly opposite the petrol station in Lickey. The inscription reads "To commend to imitation the exemplary private virtues of Other Archer 6th Earl of Plymouth". The Earl had land at Tardebigge, near Lickey.

== Houses ==
Lickey has some late Victorian houses but there was steady development of housing in the 20th century. Since the 1990s, there has been 'infill' housing.

== Transport ==
Lickey is served by hourly buses to Bromsgrove, Rubery, Droitwich and Halesowen. These are operated by Diamond Bus. The nearest railway station is Longbridge in Rubery with a frequent West Midlands Trains service to Birmingham New Street.

== See also ==
- Barnt Green
- Lickey Incline
- Lickey Hills Country Park
- Cofton Hackett
