= Barnt Green =

Village and civil parish in Worcestershire, England

Coordinates: 52.360°N 1.999°W

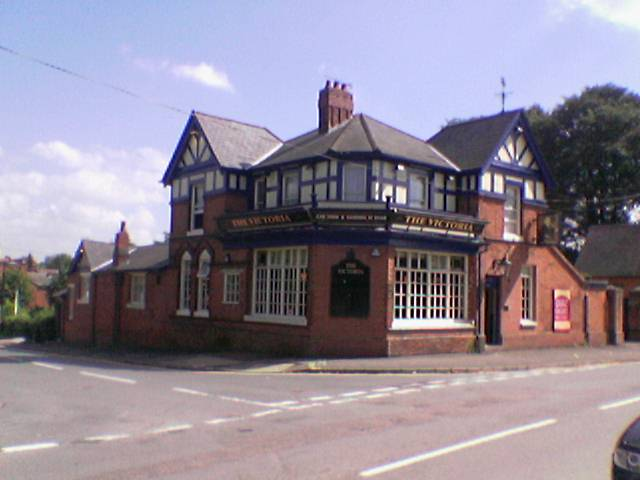
- Victoria public house

- Location within Worcestershire
- Population: 2,035 (2021)
- OS grid reference: SP0073
  - London: 100 miles (160 km)
- Civil parish: Barnt Green
- District: Bromsgrove
- Shire county: Worcestershire
- Region: West Midlands
- Country: England
- Sovereign state: United Kingdom
- Post town: BIRMINGHAM
- Postcode district: B45
- Dialling code: 0121
- Police: West Mercia
- Fire: Hereford and Worcester
- Ambulance: West Midlands
- UK Parliament: Bromsgrove

Barnt Green is a village and civil parish in the Bromsgrove District of Worcestershire, England, situated 10 miles (16 km) south of Birmingham city centre, with a population at the 2021 census of 2,035.

== History ==
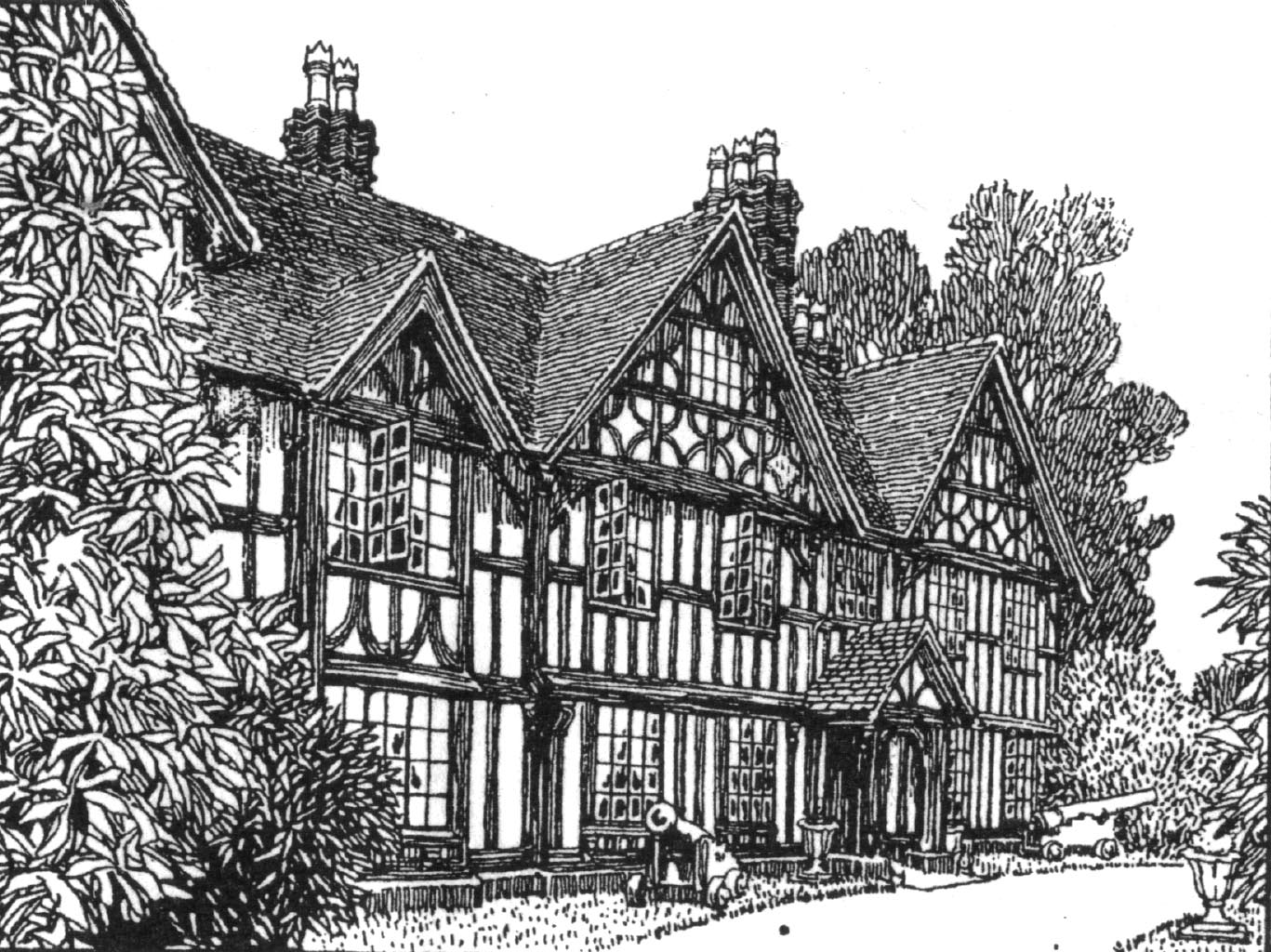
'Barnt Green House', etching from the early 19th century.

Originating from the development of the railway, Barnt Green has always been a commuter settlement. When the Birmingham and Gloucester Railway was completed in 1840 the only buildings already in existence on an 1880 map were Barnt Green House, probably the oldest recorded bearer of the name Barnt Green, the buildings which made up the railway station, and Sandhills Farm which dates from the 15th century.

The early establishment of Barnt Green as a village began with the construction of The Victoria a public house that was originally built as a temperance house at the start of the 20th century. A later map from 1905 already shows several buildings, including the Victoria and many of the terraced houses which skirt today's shops.

=== Development ===
The majority of the village is a product of the 20th century. Much of its development occurred between the World Wars, with very many houses built between the 1940s and 1970s, and some newer redbrick development.

Despite the proximity of the Birmingham conurbation, the built up area of the city is concealed by hills to the north and the landscape retains a rural aspect. The area provides an environment for wildlife, including birds, foxes, deer and badgers.

== Location ==
Immediately above (in height) to the northwest are the Lickey Hills Country Park and the Victorian houses of Lickey. Almost immediately to the north is the site of the former Longbridge car factory and beyond that Birmingham.

Northeast are Cofton Hackett and the Bittell Reservoirs, with the Worcester and Birmingham Canal running alongside. To the east, farmland stretches from the edge of the factory right across to Hopwood. This large block of rural land forms a part of the green belt which encircles the settlement.

Southeast is the older village of Alvechurch and beyond that Redditch. South of the village, across the M42 motorway, is the large stretch of farmland of Cobley and Tardebigge which runs to the ancient seat of the Earl of Plymouth, Hewell Grange (now a prison).

To the southwest, the Lickey Incline, a stretch of railway, runs down the Bunter geological formation to Blackwell and Bromsgrove. The M5 motorway lies to the west.

== Services ==
Barnt Green railway station is on the Cross-City Line (Redditch to Lichfield) and the Birmingham to Worcester via Bromsgrove Line. The area is close to junctions on the M5 and M42 motorways, as well as the nearby A38.

In the centre of the village is a linear shopping street and small park. Other facilities include a sports club, a cricket club, and separate Quaker, Baptist and Church of England churches. St Andrew's C of E First School is also based in the village.

== Notable people ==
- Charles Banner, Conservative peer and King's Counsel, was raised in Barnt Green and has the village as the territorial designation on his letters patent
- Granville Bantock, composer, spent the last two years of his life in Barnt Green, and his grandson Gavin Bantock was born there.
- Patrick Beesly, author and naval intelligence officer, identified with the conclusion that the British Admiralty under Winston Churchill was responsible for the deliberate endangering of the RMS Lusitania, sunk in 1915, was born in Barnt Green in 1913
- Susan Jameson, actress and writer, was born in Barnt Green in 1941
- Jamelia, singer and television personality, lives in Barnt Green with her husband and three daughters
- Ian Lavender, comic actor — notably in the BBC TV series Dad's Army — who was born in nearby Birmingham, was wicket keeper for Barnt Green Cricket Club
- Margaret Leighton, award-winning actress, born in Barnt Green in 1922
- Ben Francis, British billionaire businessman
- Jack Grealish, footballer (Aston Villa, Manchester City), resident as of 2024.
- Richard Parker, the Mayor of the West Midlands since May 2024, lives in Barnt Green
