= Barnt Green House =

Coordinates: 52.364896°N 1.992044°W

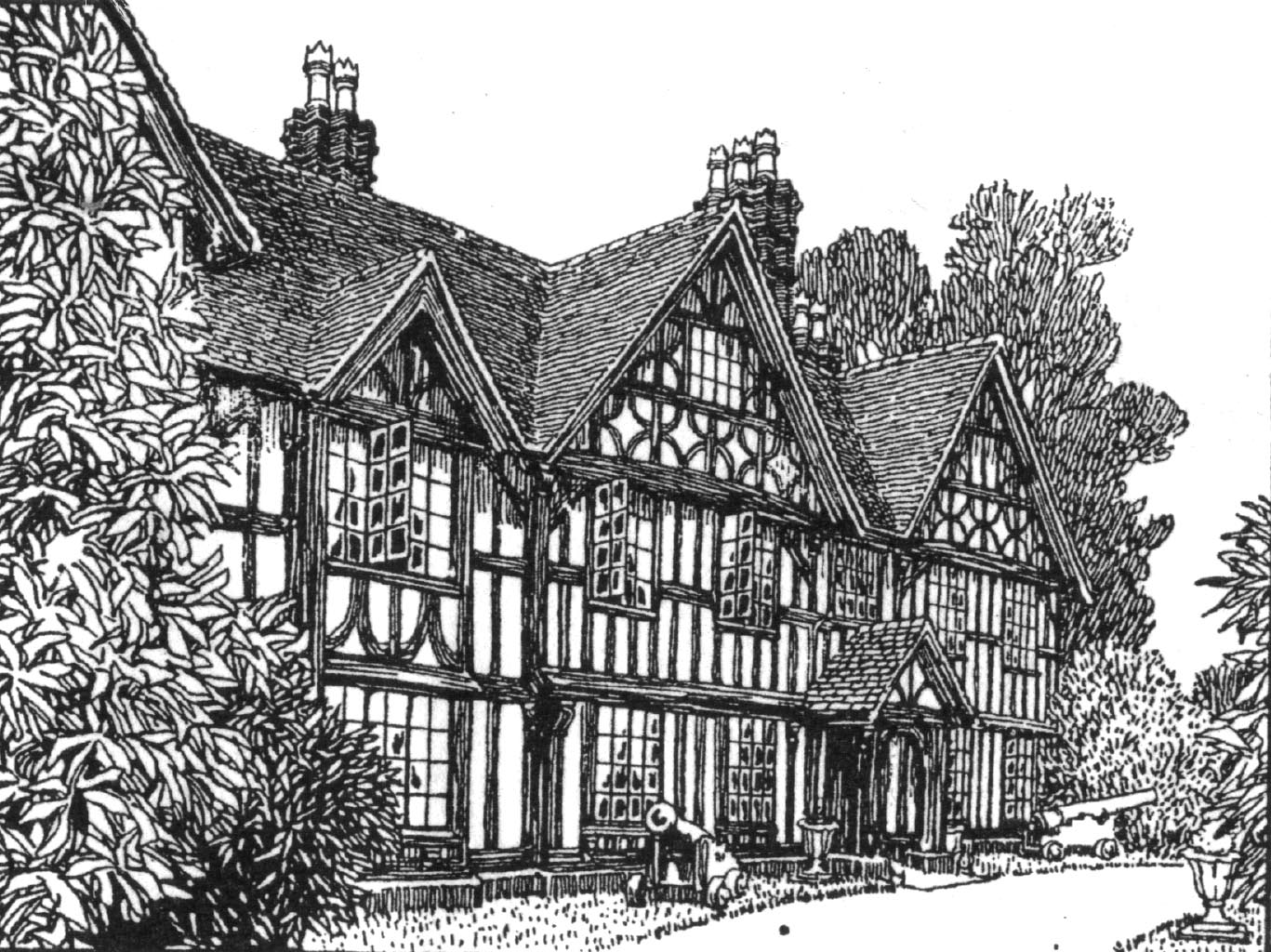
- 'Barnt Green House', etching from the Early 19th Century. Likely to be a pen and ink drawing by EW Green, a midland artist. See ewgreen.org.uk
- Interactive map of the Barnt Green House area

General information
- Type: Building
- Architectural style: Tudorbethan
- Classification: Grade II
- Location: Barnt Green, United Kingdom
- Opened: 1651
- Renovated: Early 19th century

Barnt Green House is a building at Barnt Green, Worcestershire, England. It is a Grade II listed building.

It was once a residence of the local nobles, the Earls of Plymouth. Queen Victoria is reputed to have spent the night there.

The house was bought by Other Windsor, 6th Earl of Plymouth in 1811, from the previous occupants, the Yates family.

Records state that the house was built in 1651.

The building has lost almost all of its grounds and is now a wine bar and gastropub, known as the Barnt Green Inn.

== See also ==
- History of Worcestershire
