= Colmers School =

Coordinates: 52.3964°N 2.0022°W

Location
- Bristol Road South; Rednal; Birmingham, West Midlands, B45 9NY; England

Information
- Type: Foundation school
- Local authority: Birmingham City Council
- Department for Education URN: 103563 Tables
- Ofsted: Reports
- Headteacher: Peter White
- Gender: Coeducational
- Age: 11 to 19
- Enrolment: 1,215 as of January 2023
- Website: http://www.colmers.school

Colmers School is a coeducational secondary school and sixth form located in the Rednal area of Birmingham, in the West Midlands of England.

Previously a community school solely administered by Birmingham City Council, Colmers School became a foundation school in 2009. The school offers GCSEs and BTECs as programmes of study for pupils. The school also has a sixth form consisting of Year 12 and 13 students, based in its Sixth Form Centre with students studying a range of A-level subjects.

Colmers Community Leisure Centre also operates from the school site, offering sports and leisure facilities to the local community outside school hours.

== Notable people ==
- Rick Price, guitarist in The Move and Wizzard, grew up in Rednal and went to Colmers Farm Secondary School.
