= St Michael and All Angels' Church, Cofton Hackett =

St Michael and All Angels’ Church, Cofton Hackett
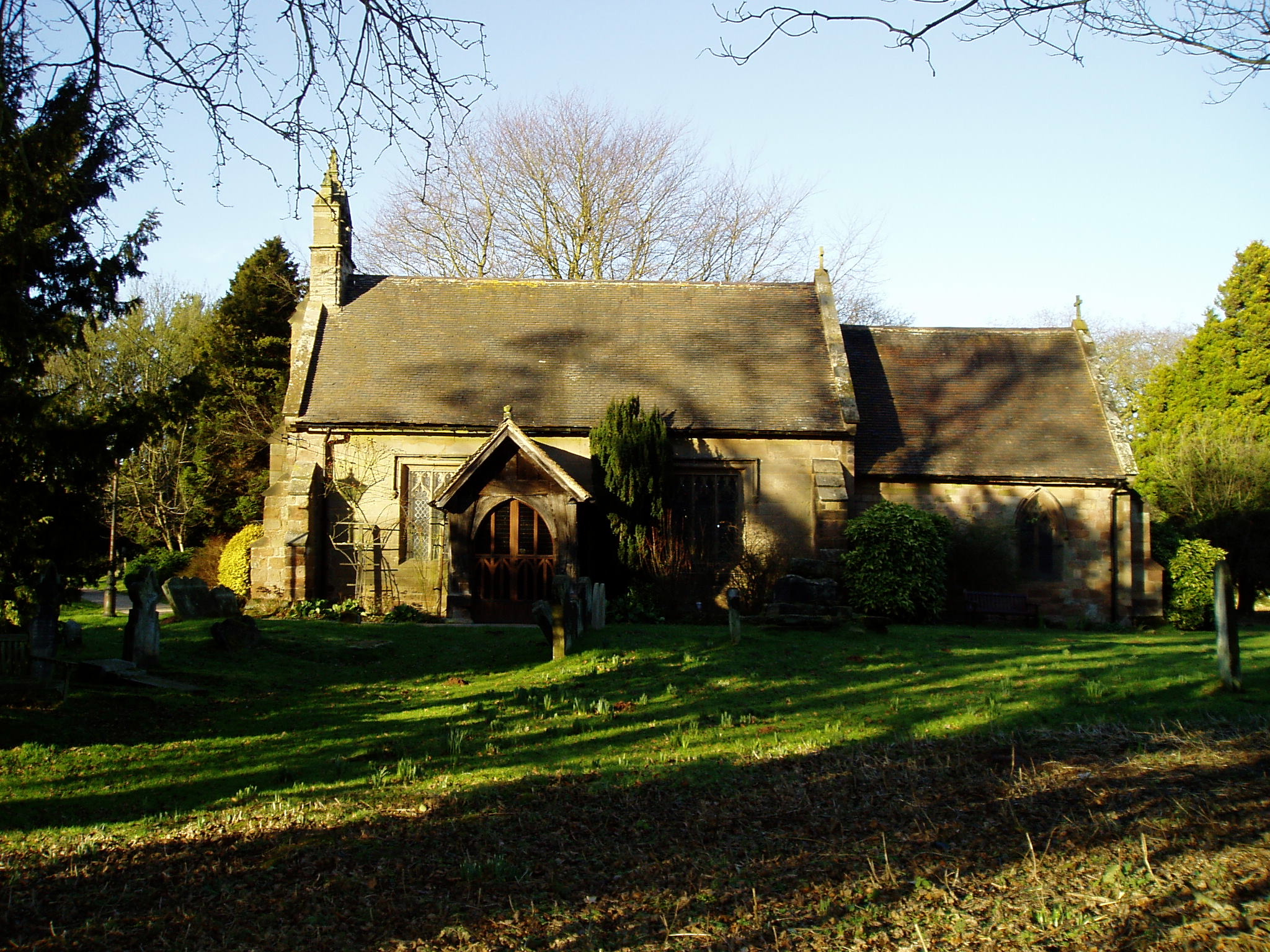
- St Michael and All Angels’ Church, Cofton Hackett
- St Michael and All Angels’ Church, Cofton Hackett
- 52°22′33.96″N 1°58′54.8″W
- Location: Cofton Hackett
- Country: England
- Denomination: Church of England
- Website: standrewscofe.org.uk

History
- Dedication: St Michael All Saints

Architecture
- Heritage designation: Grade II* listed

Administration
- Diocese: Anglican Diocese of Birmingham
- Archdeaconry: Birmingham
- Deanery: King’s Norton
- Parish: Cofton Hackett and Barnt Green

St Michael and All Angels' Church, Cofton Hackett is a Grade II* listed parish church in the Church of England in Worcestershire.

== History ==
St Michael and All Angels Anglican Church is located on Cofton Church Lane. A church may have existed on the site in the 12th century, as a "chapel" at Cofton is mentioned in a Papal Bull of 1182.

The present building certainly dates back to the 14th century and was probably built in 1330 by Robert de Leycester as a chapel for the Manor House. It was a chapel annexed to St Laurence's Church, Northfield until 1866.

The church was renovated in 1861 by the architect Henry Day.

The church is in a joint parish with St. Andrew's Church, Barnt Green.
