= Waseley Hills High School and Sixth Form Centre =

Location
- School Road; Rubery, West Midlands, B45 9EL; England
- Coordinates: 52°23′29″N 2°01′52″W

Information
- Type: Academy
- Founder: Matthew Scanlon
- Local authority: Worcestershire
- Specialist: Business and Enterprise College
- Department for Education URN: 138664 Tables
- Ofsted: Reports
- Chair: Eric Hogg
- Headteacher: Tom Preston
- Gender: Mixed
- Age: 11 to 19
- Enrolment: 710
- Website: http://www.waseleyhills.worcs.sch.uk/

Waseley Hills High School and Sixth Form Centre is a mixed secondary school and sixth form with academy status in the town of Rubery, on the border of the county of Worcestershire and the city of Birmingham, England, at the base of the Waseley Hills Country Park.

The school with its dedicated sixth form centre has about 710 students on roll. The school also has specialist hearing impaired provision, and a specialist able autism base. It has gained a number of awards, including the Artsmark award in the academic term 2005/2006.

The school's catchment area includes the surrounding primary schools of Lickey Hills Primary, Holywell Primary, and Beaconside Primary and Nursery.

Waseley converted to academy status in September 2012.

Waseley was identified as one of the poorest performing schools in England (2017–18)

A 2010 Ofsted report accorded the school a Grade 3 (satisfactory). A 2018 Ofsted report accorded the school a Grade "requires improvement" . The school still remains in this category as of March 2021.
