= Longbridge =

Area of Birmingham, England

Coordinates: 52.395°N 1.979°W

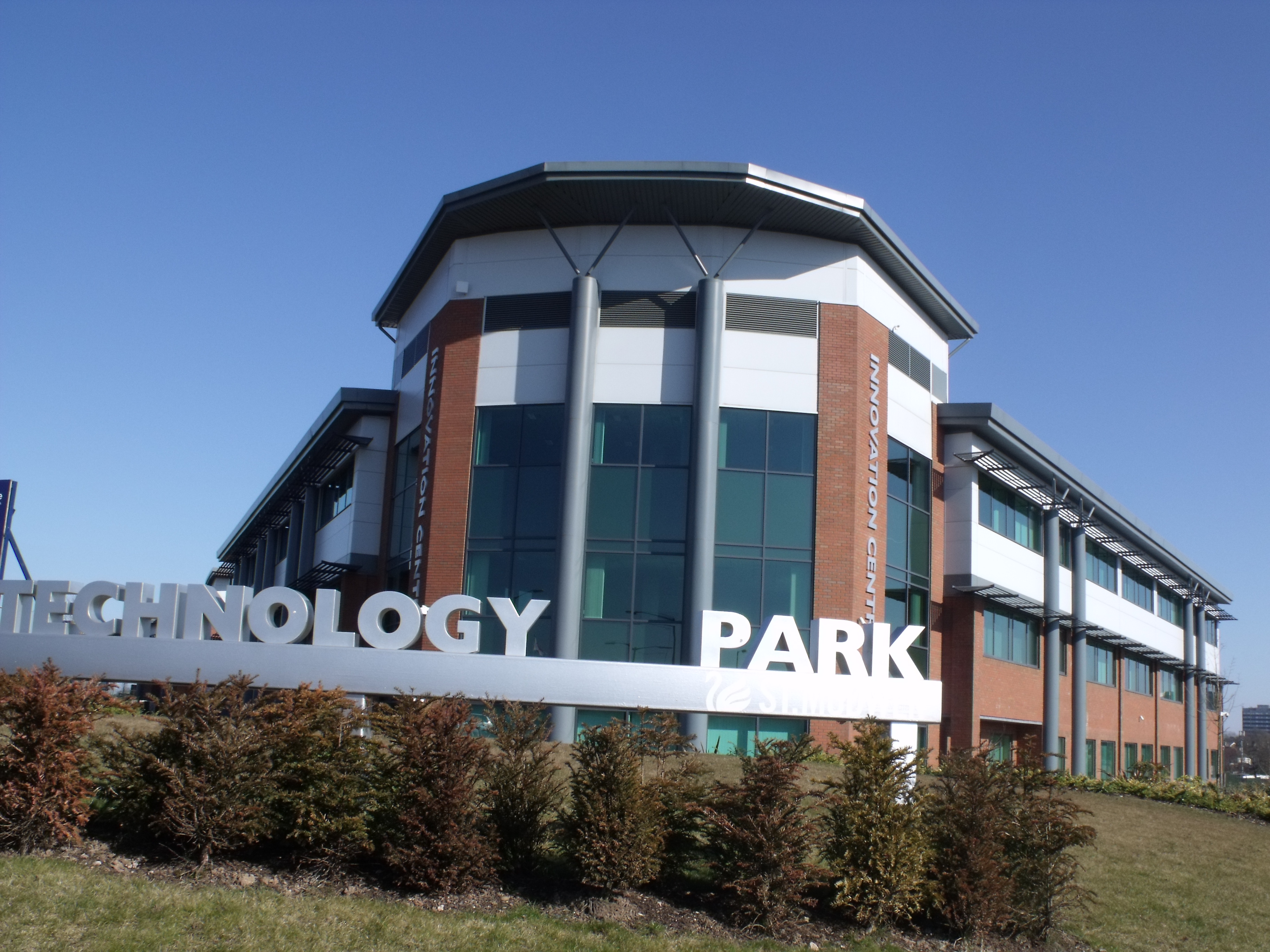
- Longbridge Technology Park – Innovation Centre (March 2010)

- Location within the West Midlands
- Population: 25,410 (2011 ward)
  - Density: 36.2 per ha
- OS grid reference: SP015775
- Metropolitan borough: Birmingham
- Metropolitan county: West Midlands
- Region: West Midlands
- Country: England
- Sovereign state: United Kingdom
- Post town: Birmingham
- Postcode district: B31, B45
- Dialling code: 0121
- Police: West Midlands
- Fire: West Midlands
- Ambulance: West Midlands
- UK Parliament: Birmingham Northfield

Longbridge is an area in the south-west of Birmingham, England, located near the border with Worcestershire, the county it was historically in.

== Geography ==
Longbridge is surrounded by Frankley, Frankley Beeches, Rubery, Rednal, Bromsgrove, Northfield, West Heath and Kings Norton. Longbridge is in close proximity to and can be viewed from the Lickey Hills.

== Economy ==
=== Longbridge plant ===
Since 1906, the area has been dominated by the Longbridge plant, which produced Austin, Nash Metropolitan, Morris, British Leyland, and most recently MG Rover cars. The factory became dormant, and some parts of the older sections of the site were demolished after MG Rover fell into administration in April 2005. The plant was one of the main employers of the local population and the resultant layoffs caused local decline. The company, renamed MG Motor (owned by MG Rover's would-be partner Shanghai Automotive Industry Corporation) resumed limited MG TF sports car production within a small portion of the factory in August 2008 and in late 2010 started final assembly of the MG6. Production ceased completely in 2017, when the Chinese car maker decided to ship the fully assembled cars to the UK. The remaining disused sections of the factory were demolished on 4 August 2006.

=== Regeneration ===
Work began in 2005 on the Longbridge Technology Park on 16 hectares (40 acres) of the former MG Rover site in Longbridge, Birmingham, including the Devon Way area, with plans for research, development and production facilities expected to create around 2,500 jobs as part of the site’s long-term regeneration.

In November 2011, Birmingham City Council approved the next phase of Longbridge Technology Park, including the 21,000 sq ft (1,951 m^{2}) grade A office building Three Devon Way. Two Devon Way, a 30,000-square-foot (2,800 m^{2}) office building in the technology park, was sold by St. Modwen to UKO Serviced Offices, a subsidiary of UK Land Limited, for £3.75 million.

== Governance ==
Longbridge forms part of the ward of Longbridge and West Heath, which, as of the 2026 Birmingham City Council election, is represented on Birmingham City Council by Charlie Latchford and Anthony Ward, both of Reform UK.

== Demographics ==
The 2001 census recorded that there were 30,964 people living in Longbridge with a population density of 3,789 people per km^{2} compared with 3,649 people per km^{2} for Birmingham. Longbridge has a small ethnic minority population: only 6.8% (2,117) of the ward's population consists of ethnic minorities, unlike more centralised areas such as Aston, Handsworth and Small Heath.

== Transport ==
Public transport services in Longbridge include bus services operated by Kev's Coaches and National Express West Midlands. These routes pass through the area with destinations including Birmingham city centre, West Bromwich and the Queen Elizabeth Hospital in Edgbaston.

West Midlands Railway serves Longbridge railway station on the Cross City Line, with destinations at Redditch or Bromsgrove and Four Oaks or Lichfield with connections to Hereford and Nottingham at University station or nationwide at Birmingham New Street station. In 2020, a large multi-storey carpark was built near Longbridge station as a park and ride facility.

== Notable people ==
- Mark Frost, actor
- Lewis Goodall, journalist
- David Haddleton, academic

== See also ==
- St John the Baptist's Church, Longbridge
