= Toposcope =

Graphic display to indicate direction to landscape features

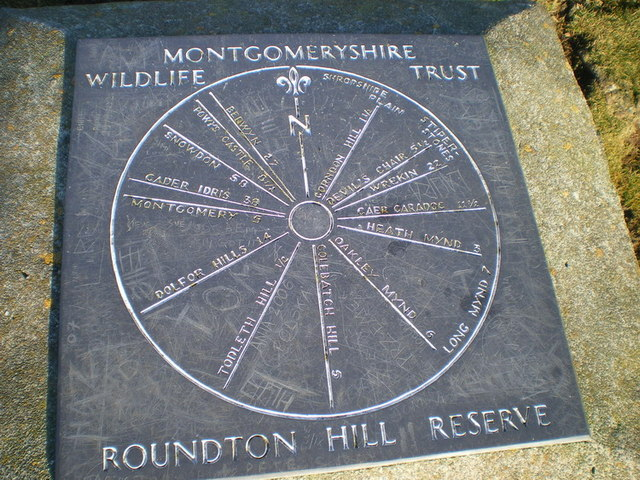
Slate toposcope at the top of Roundton Hill, with North prominently marked.

A toposcope, topograph, or orientation table is a kind of graphic display erected at viewing points on hills, mountains or other high places which indicates the direction, and usually the distance, to notable landscape features which can be seen from that point. They are often placed in public parks, country parks, the grounds of stately homes, at popular vantage points (especially accompanying or built into triangulation stations) or places of historical note, such as battlefields.

Toposcopes usually show the points of the compass, or at least North.

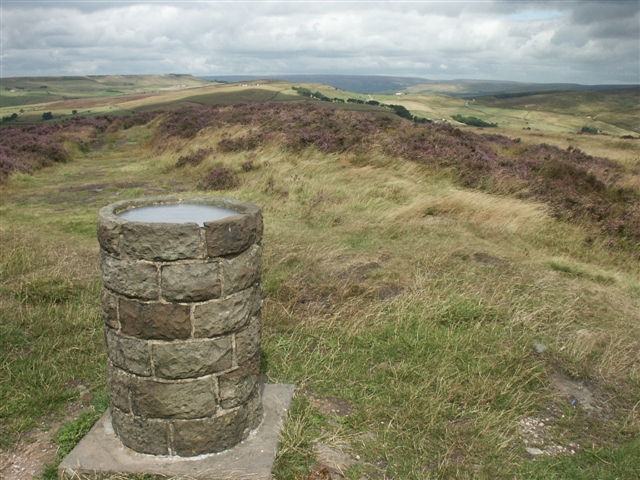
A plinth-mounted toposcope atop Lantern Pike.

Smaller toposcopes usually consist of a circular plaque, or a plaque with a circle marked on it, mounted horizontally on a plinth. They have radiating lines indicating the direction to various landmarks, together with the distance and often a pictorial representation of the landmark. They are frequently constructed of a metal such as bronze, cast or etched, set on top of a concrete or stone block, which provides weather- and vandal-resistance.

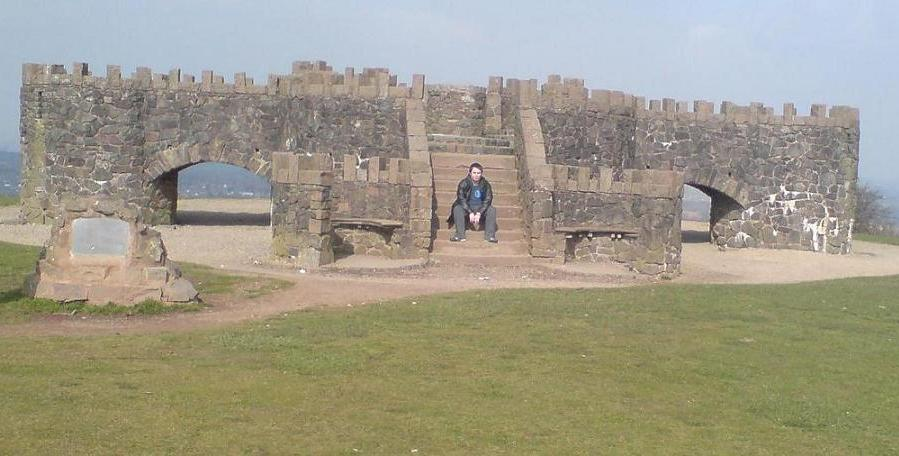
An elaborate toposcope on Beacon Hill in the Lickey Hills near Birmingham, UK

Large toposcopes may be circular paved areas, with numerous plaques around the perimeter, each indicating a particular feature of the landscape.
