= Haffield Breccia =

Type of soil

Haffield Breccia, or Clent Breccia, (now known as the Haffield and Clent Formations) consist of a texturally immature compacted gravel, rich in volcanic clasts with some sedimentary rocks, in a sandy or muddy matrix, which outcrops in the English Midlands, in South Staffordshire, Birmingham and the Malverns. It is thought to have been deposited by during flash floods in rivers that were flowing through a desert, somewhere between 200 and 280 million years ago during the Permian period. The gravel consists of angular fragments, showing that they have not been transported over long distances.

== See also ==
- Clent Hills
