= Rubery =

Coordinates: 52.389°N 2.022°W

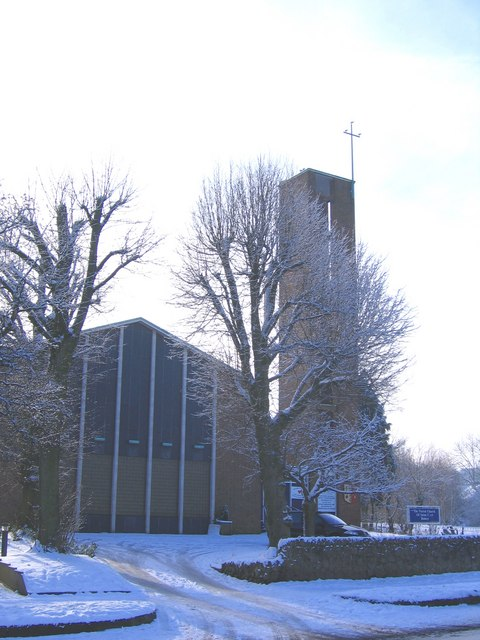
- St Chad's Church, Rubery

- Location within Worcestershire
- OS grid reference: SO985768
- District: Birmingham and Bromsgrove
- Shire county: Worcestershire
- Region: West Midlands
- Country: England
- Sovereign state: United Kingdom
- Post town: BIRMINGHAM
- Postcode district: B45
- Dialling code: 0121
- Police: West Mercia
- Fire: Hereford and Worcester
- Ambulance: West Midlands
- UK Parliament: Bromsgrove

Rubery is the name of two adjacent settlements; one a village in the Bromsgrove District of Worcestershire, the other a suburb of Birmingham in the West Midlands, England. It is 4 miles (6.4 km) from Bromsgrove town centre, and 7 miles (11 km) from Birmingham city centre.

Rubery was built on a sandstone quarry, now known as "Rubery Cutting"/"Leach Green Quarry", parts of which can still be seen near the Rubery 'Fly-over'. Former clay mining pits, later flooded and known locally as 'The Marl Holes', now make up Callowbrook Park, which, alongside St Chads Park, is one of the two main parks in the village.

Much of the urbanisation in Rubery occurred between 1960 and 1970, where suburbs replaced former farmland and historic farms such as Callowbrook Farm (formally located at the site of Callowbrook Bridge) and Gunner Lane Farm.

== Etymology ==
The word "Rubery" comes from the old English word "rowbery" meaning "a rough hill", which may refer to Rubery Hill, situated on "Cock-Hill Lane".

== Geography and demography ==
The settlement is divided between Birmingham and Bromsgrove. The boundary for both districts is between both Cock Hill Lane and Callowbrook Lane.

Rubery also contiguous with nearby New Frankley, Northfield and Rednal which are all part of Birmingham.

Rubery lies next to both the A38 road and M5 motorway. The village has good connections to nearby Birmingham, Bromsgrove, Redditch, Stourbridge, Worcester and Kidderminster.

The population of Rubery was recorded at 11,016 for the Rubery and Rednal Ward of Birmingham, while the Bromsgrove wards of Rubery North and South had populations of both 3,643 (North) and 2,964 (South).

Rubery was served by a railway station on the former Halesowen Railway which linked it with Old Hill, Halesowen and Longbridge. The station and line closed in the 1930s and have since been redeveloped and turned into public footpath.

== Literary connections ==
The author Jonathan Coe (b.1961) was brought up in Rubery, and his novel "The Terrible Privacy of Maxwell Sim" names several local places and landmarks.

== Politics ==
Rubery lies within the ward of Rubery and Rednal, and is represented on Birmingham City Council by Rebecca Waters of Reform UK.

Geographically, most of Rubery lies in the Beacon Ward of Worcestershire County Council, and under both the Waseley and Beacon areas for Bromsgrove District Council. Part of Rubery falls under Birmingham Council.
