= Our Lady and St Brigid's Church, Northfield =

Our Lady and St Brigid's Church
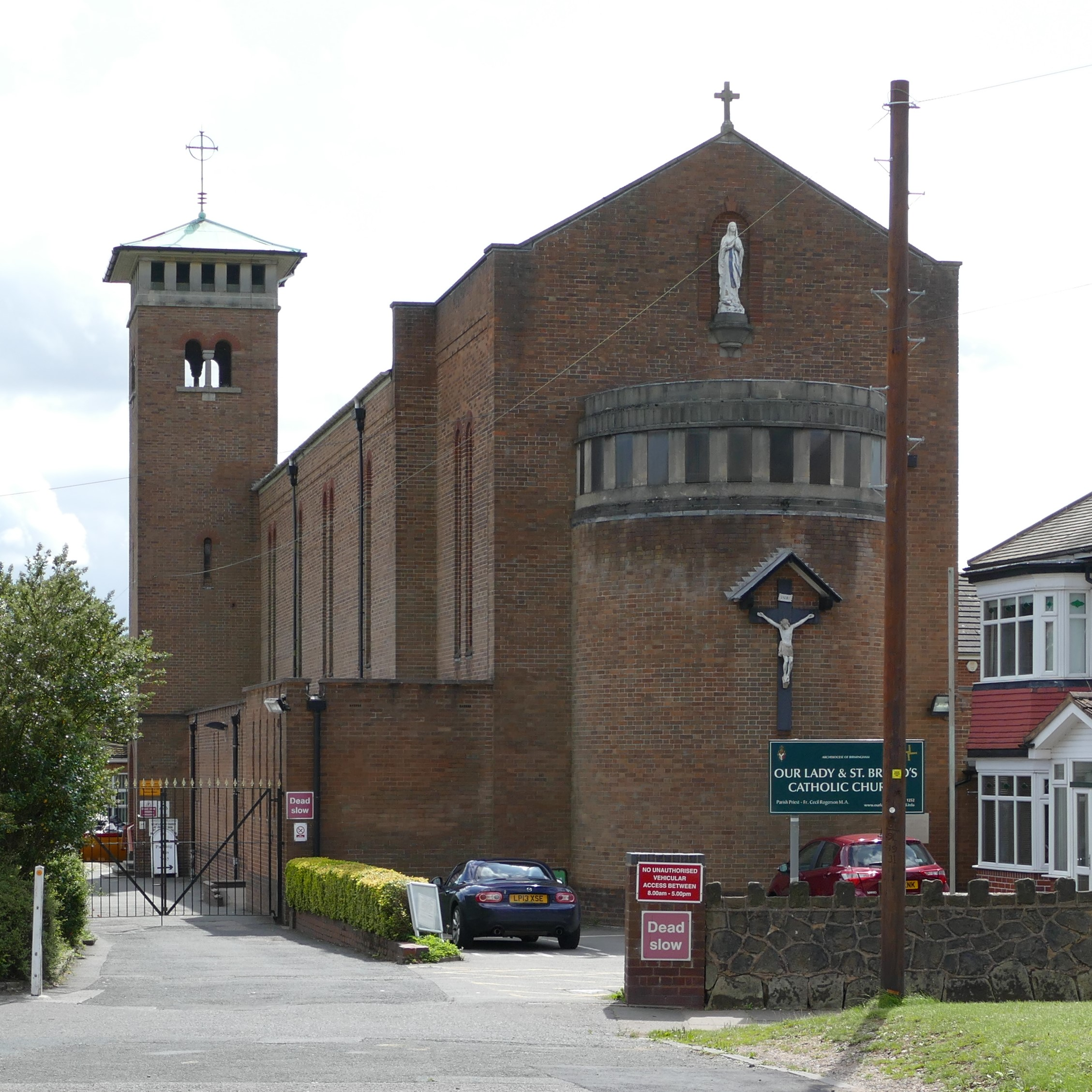
- Our Lady and St Brigid's Church
- 52°24′39.53″N 1°58′36.22″W
- OS grid reference: SP 01689 79248
- Location: Northfield, Birmingham
- Country: England
- Denomination: Roman Catholic
- Website: ourladyandstbrigid.info

History
- Dedication: Our Lady and St Brigid

Architecture
- Architect: Ernest Bower Norris
- Completed: 1936

Administration
- Diocese: Roman Catholic Archdiocese of Birmingham

The Church of Our Lady and St Brigid Northfield is a Roman Catholic parish church located in Northfield, Birmingham.

== History ==
A mission was established in 1918 on Steel Road. By 1921, it was called St Bride, and the priest, George Mesher, had three boarders, Frank Warwick and his family. Land was acquired in 1936, and a temporary church was erected in 1931. The current building was completed in 1936, based on designs by architect Ernest Bower Norris. The church is built of red brick and a clerestoried nave with aisles, a chancel, and a south chapel. The bell tower is positioned above the south-west porch.

The church contains a large mural of the Resurrection, painted by Neil Harvey and completed in 2000.

== Organ ==
The church formerly housed an organ by Harris Organ Ltd. Its specification is available on the National Pipe Organ Register.
