= Ernest Bower Norris =

British architect (1889–1969)

Ernest Bower Norris FRIBA
- Born: Ernest Bower Norris; 15 February 1889; Didsbury, Manchester, England
- Died: 24 April 1969 (aged 80); Durban, South Africa,
- Education: Manchester School of Art
- Occupation: Architect
- Buildings: St Peter and St Paul's Church, New Brighton; St John the Baptist Church, Rochdale; Our Lady and St Brigid's Church, Northfield; St Cecilia's Church, Liverpool; St John Fisher, West Heath, Birmingham

Ernest Bower Norris FRIBA () was a prolific architect practising mostly in the north-west of England. His style fused modern, traditional and international influences, although in his ecclesiastical work he often favoured neo-byzantine or romanesque. A review of his work published in 1938 said that he had designed 80 schools and over 40 churches. At this stage he was mid-career and continued practising for a further 30 years. His buildings are predominantly brick, although often with steel or concrete structural support.

== Early life ==
Ernest Bower Norris was born in Didsbury, Manchester, in 1889. His father was James Higginbotham Norris and his mother Ellen Frances Bower. His father was an estate agent and a strict Methodist, holding lay offices in both the church and the Sunday school for most of his life. However, he converted to Roman Catholicism as a young man.

Ernest Norris attended Manchester Grammar School and then studied architecture at Manchester School of Art while articled to James Harold France. While there, he won prizes from the Manchester Society of Architects in 1907, 1908, and 1909. He is also listed as having received book prizes in the Board of Education's National Competitions in 1909, 1910, and 1911. The book prize was better than a commendation, but not as good as a medal. In the same 1910 competition, he was awarded a free studentship. In 1909, on completing his studies he spent time in Italy surveying and sketching renaissance buildings.

There is some doubt about his movements until 1915. He spent some time working as assistant to Herbert Oswald Hill, who had been a slightly older contemporary at Manchester School of Art. Norris also spent a couple of years working for the Office of Works and nine months in the office of Edwin Lutyens. The earliest work attributed to him is the chapel at the Convent of St. Paul in Birmingham (1914) in a gothic style although other sources attribute this to Henry Sandy.

During the First World War, Norris served in the Royal Naval Volunteer Reserve (Royal Navy Reserve) assigned to HMS President (shore establishment) manning anti-aircraft/zeppelin positions in London. His service record describes him as a draughtsman before he enlisted. he was admitted to a hospital in early 1918 suffering from malaria, and was discharged from the Navy the following year.

== Style ==
Norris's early churches are mostly in the Lombard-Byzantine style, possibly influenced by his travels in Italy. This style had become popular amongst English Catholics after the completion of Bentley's Westminster Cathedral in 1903. Part of its popularity amongst Catholics was that it differentiated them from Protestant buildings, and indicated their historic lineage going back to pre-medieval Christianity. It also had the advantage of being cheaper than Gothic. The internal decorative schemes (mostly applied marble and mosaics) could be added later as funds become available. One of the best examples of the style is Church of the Sacred Heart and St Catherine of Alexandria built by Peacock in 1921. Its mosaics weren't completed until 1932. Unfortunately, none of Norris's churches were ever fully mosaicked. St John the Baptist Church, Rochdale has very fine mosaics by Eric Newton in the sanctuary. Writing about St John Fisher in West Heath the artist Johan Jones said that Norris's architecture suited his work because its "scale and detail are the unproclaiming and noble frame for the various works that adorn it".

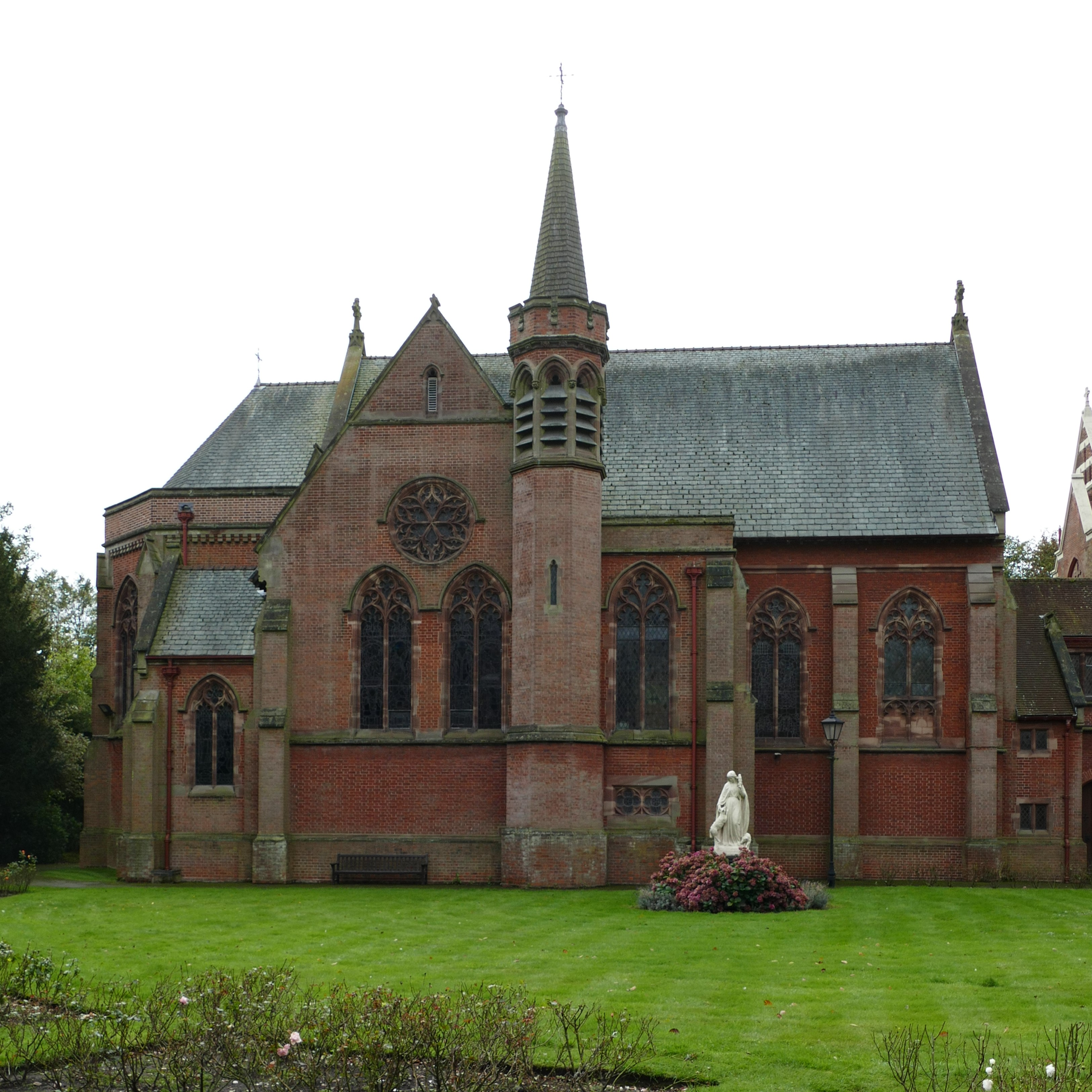
Chapel of the Convent of St Paul (1914)

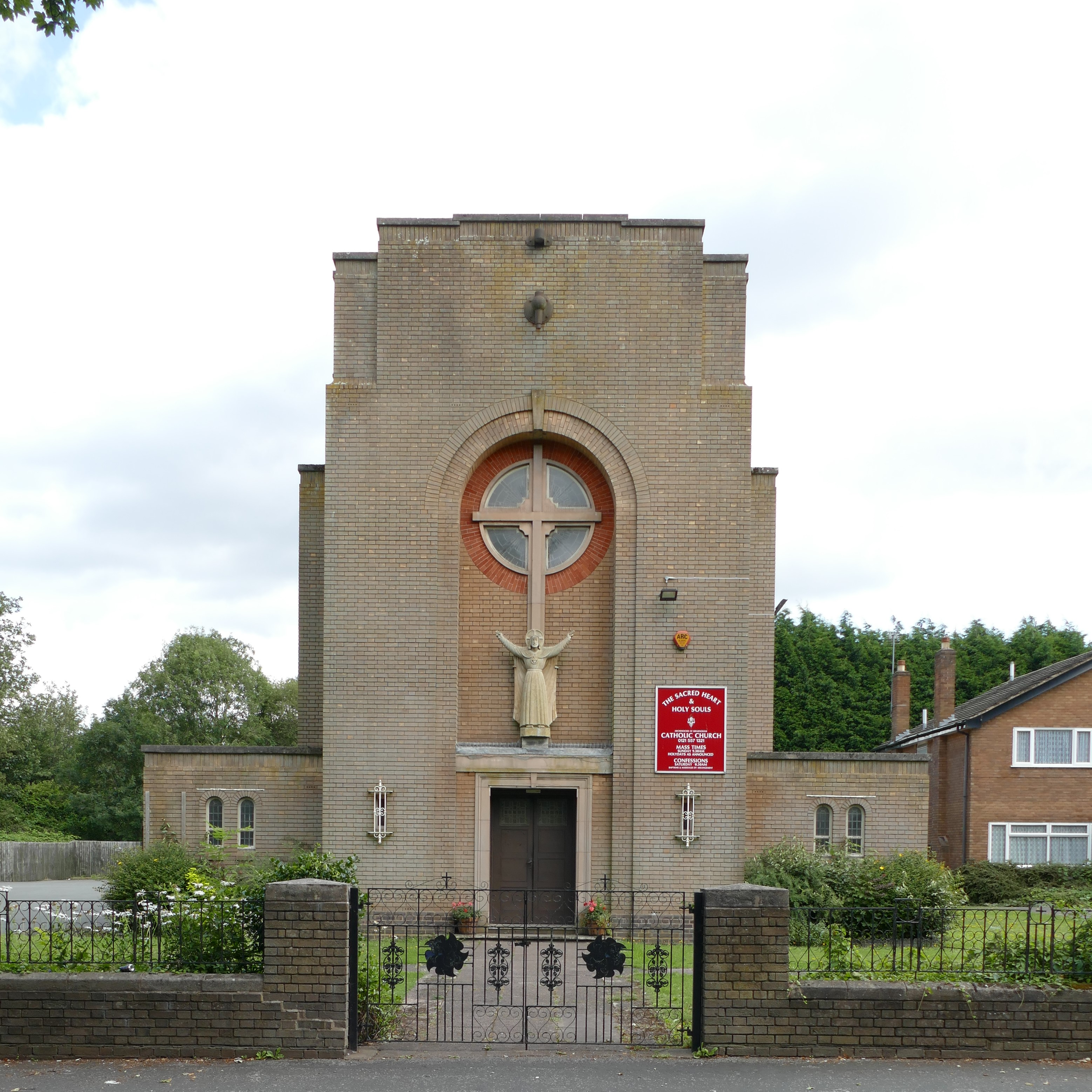
Church of Sacred Heart, Tipton (1940)

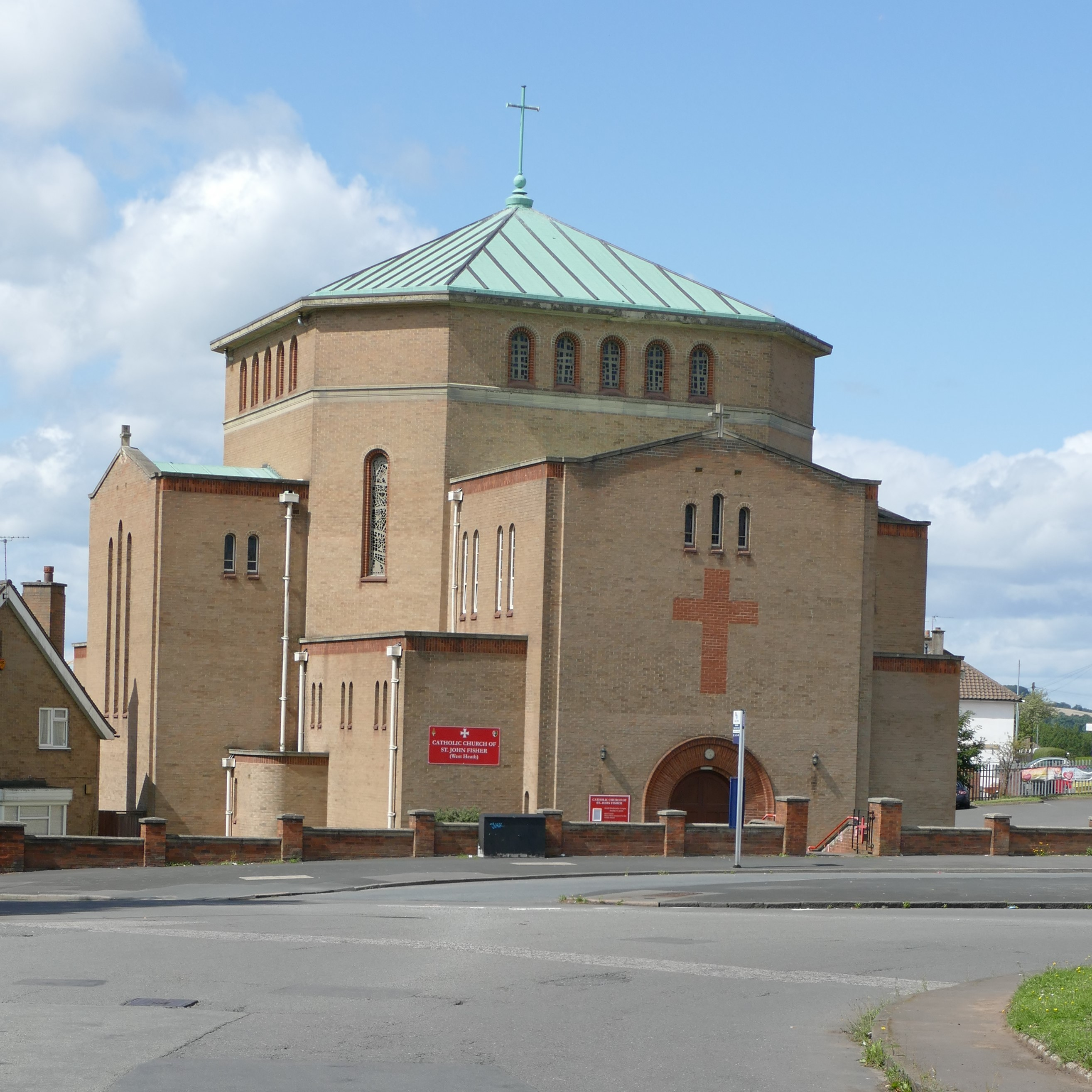
Church of St John Fisher, West Heath (1964)

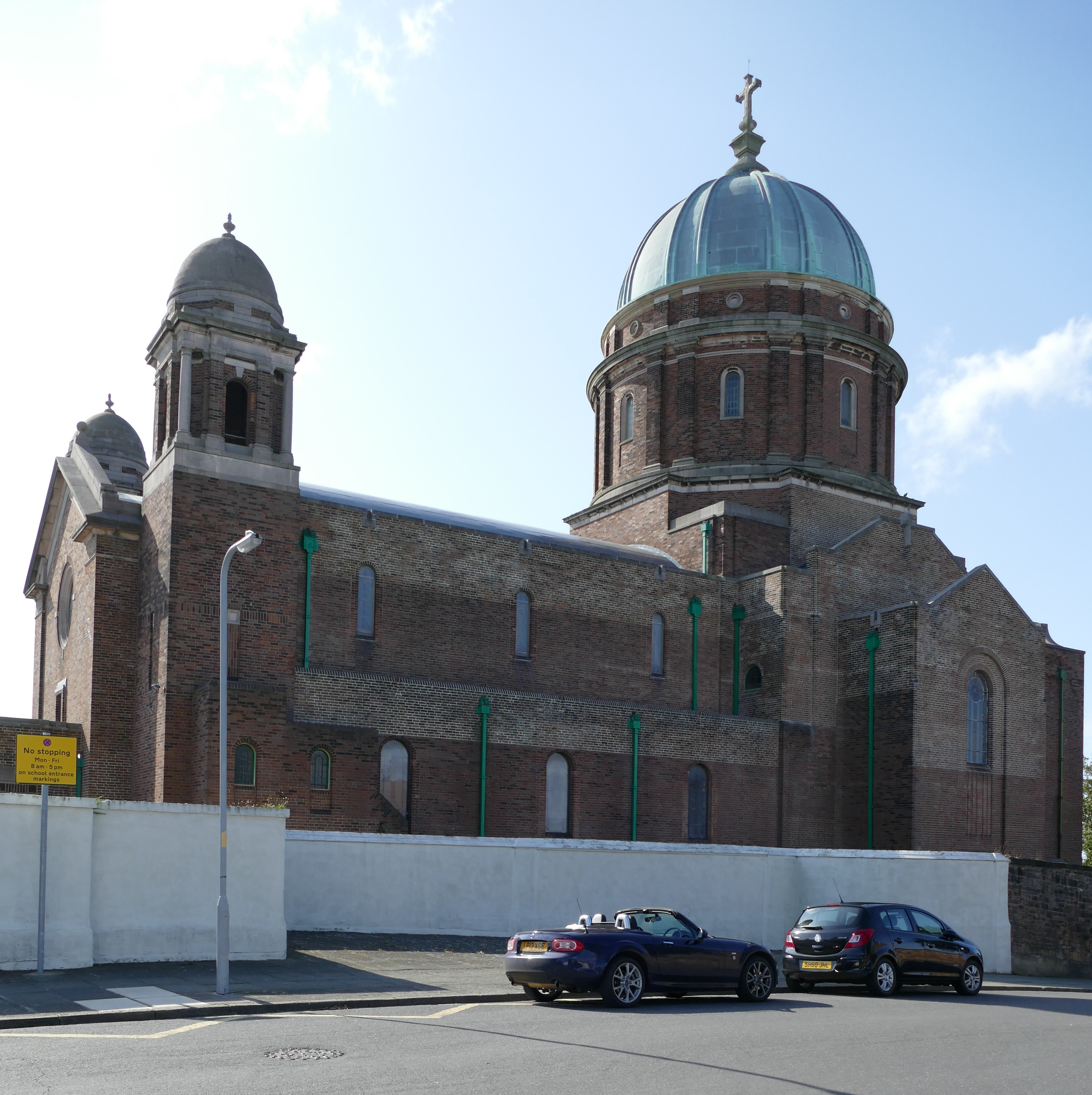
SS Peter and Paul and St Philomena (1935)

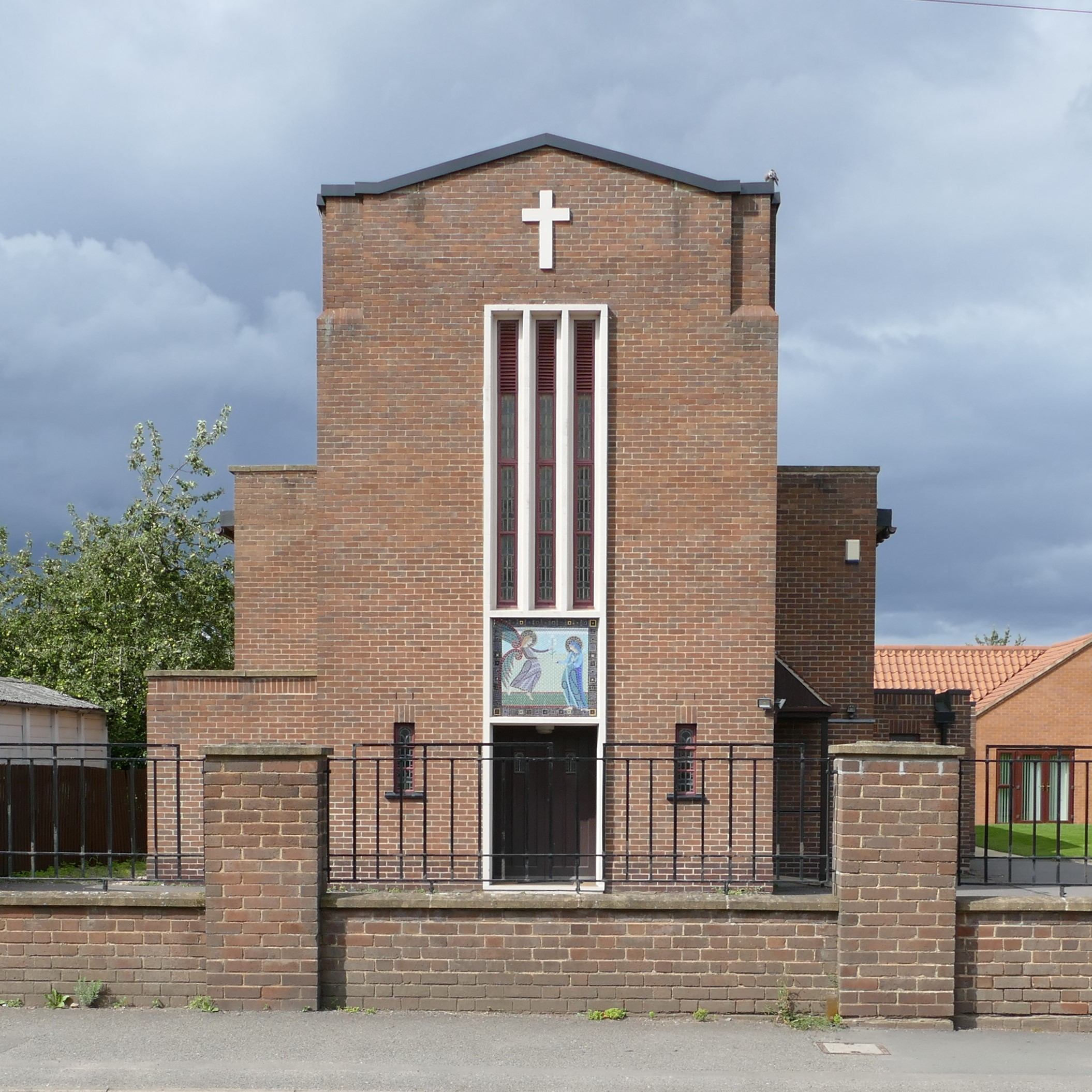
Our Lady of the Angels, East Leake (1954)

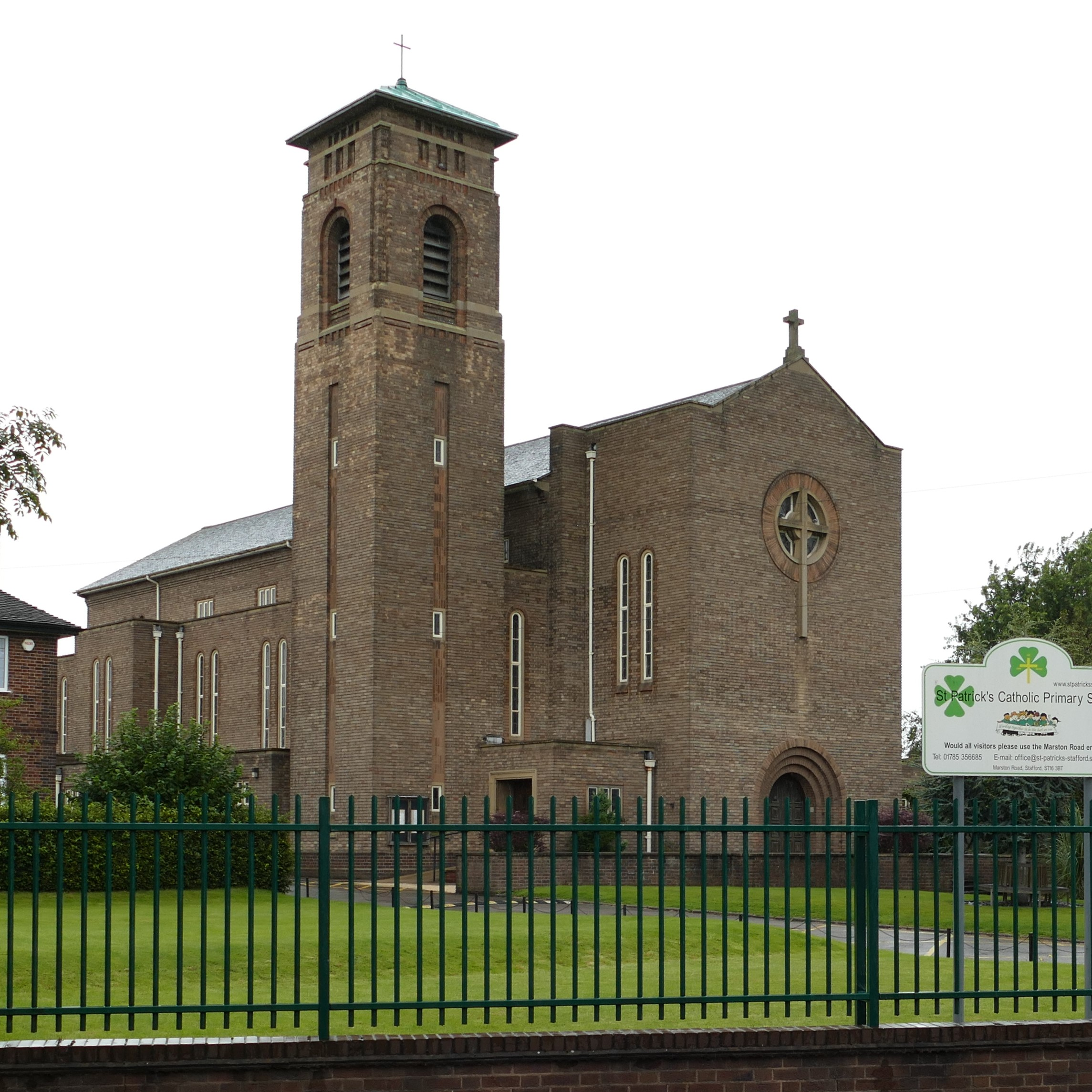
St Patrick, Stafford (1951)

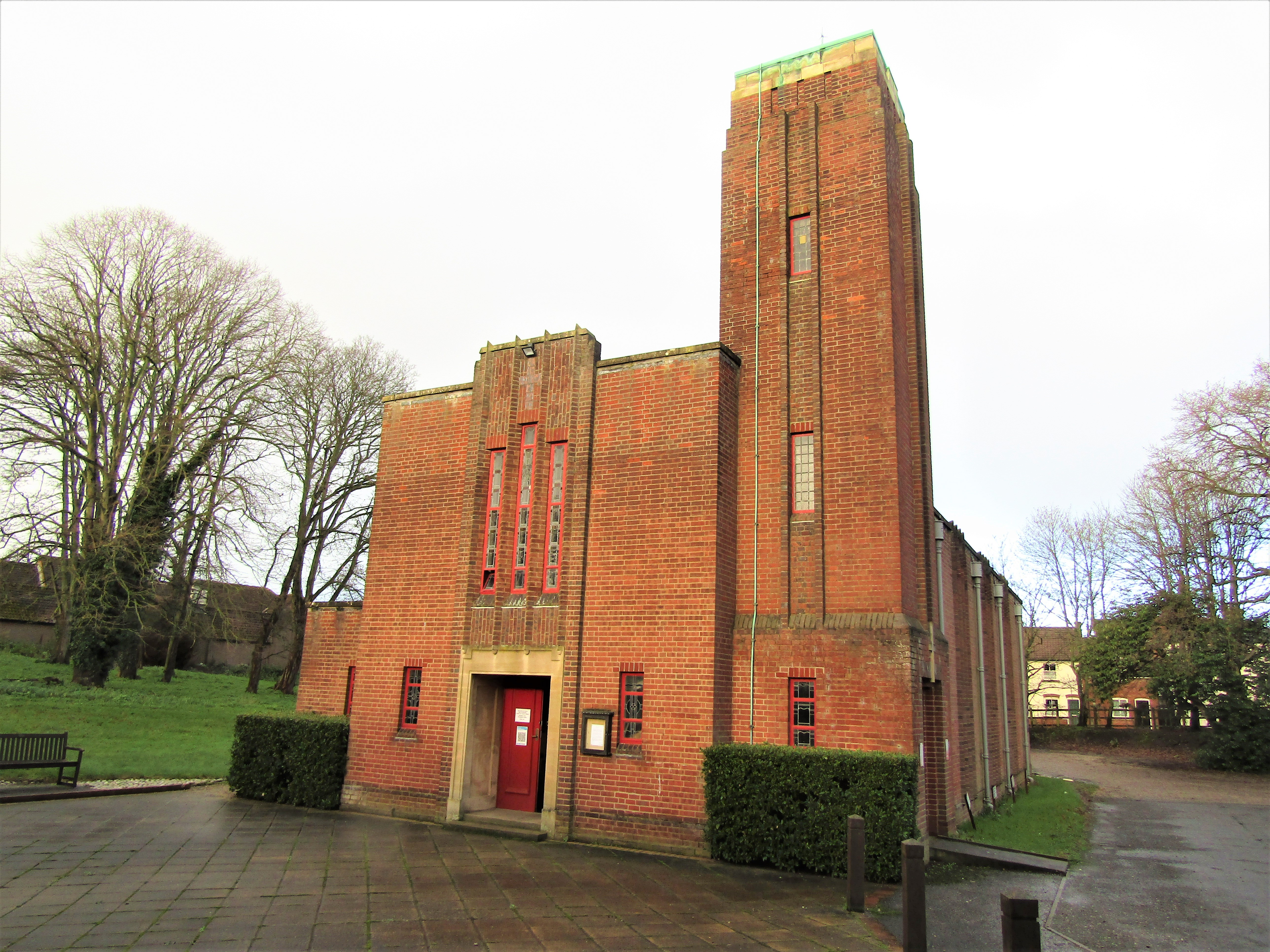
Sacred Heart Catholic Church, North Walsham, Norfolk (1935)

== Partnerships ==
Norris joined Hill, Sandy, and Norris in 1920. Henry Oswald Hill MC (1888–1917) was born the year before Norris and also studied architecture at Manchester University. He joined his father's Manchester practice but was killed in action on 21 October 1917.

Henry Thomas Sandy (1868–1922) had been practising in Stafford since 1891. In 1918, he acquired the remains of Hill's practice and his Manchester offices. After unsuccessful partnership attempts with Herbert Powell and then a Mr Mangan, in 1920 he brought Norris into partnership. The practice of Sandy and Norris had offices in Albert Square, Manchester and also at 134 Newport Road, Stafford. Unfortunately, Sandy died in 1922 at the age of 53 but Norris continued to use the styles of Hill, Sandy and Norris or just Sandy and Norris for many years.

Sometime in the 1930s, Francis Maurice Reynolds joined the practice and appears to have had responsibility for running the Manchester office. This partnership was prolific during the 1930s but was dissolved on 20 September 1946. Reynolds retained the offices in Manchester but in a new practice with William Scott while Norris practised out of Stafford under the style of Sandy and Norris. Both Norris and Reynolds continued to specialise in Roman Catholic churches, generally in Romanesque or Byzantine styles, well into the 1960s., although some argue that by this stage Reynolds by this stage was the more successful of the two.

== Offices ==
- 9 Albert Square, Manchester
- 22 Greengate, Stafford
- 20 Bedford Row, London

== Death ==
E. Bower Norris died on 24 April 1969 in Durban, South Africa. He was buried in Southern Cemetery, Manchester on 5 May 1969

== Listed buildings ==
A number of E. Bower Norris's buildings have been recognised as significant heritage assets and given statutory protection as Listed buildings

Name	Photograph	Grade	Details
St John the Baptist Church, Rochdale	St John the Baptist, Rochdale	II*	Date: 1924; Architect: Hill, Sandy and Norris; Diocese: Salford; Post code: OL11 1EX; Designed by Hill before WW1, built by Norris after Hill's death in action
St Cecilia, Liverpool	St Cecilia's Church in the rain	II	Date: 1931; Architect:Norris and Reynolds; Diocese: Liverpool; Post code: L13 7DT
St Peter and St Paul's Church, New Brighton	SS Peter and Paul and St Philomena, West Front	II	Date: 1935; Architect:Sandy and Norris; Diocese: Shrewsbury; Post code: CH45 9LT
Church of the Sacred Heart, North Walsham	South-facing elevation of the Sacred Heart Catholic Church, North Walsham	II	Date: 1935; Architect:East Anglia; Diocese: Shrewsbury; Post code: NR28 9JP
St Dunstan, Moston Lane, Manchester	St Dunstan's Church	II	Date: 1937; Architect:Norris and Reynolds; Diocese: Salford; Post code: M40 9PA
The Lady Chapel at St Charles Borromeo, Hadfield		II	Date: 1940; Architect:Norris and Reynolds; Diocese: Salford; Post code: SK13 1PQ; Taking Stock says that Norris did a major refurbishment in 1940
English Martyrs, Whalley Range, Manchester		II	Date: Architect: Diocese: Salford; Post code: M16 8GF; Taking Stock says EBN completed the work of an earlier architect.

== Churches ==
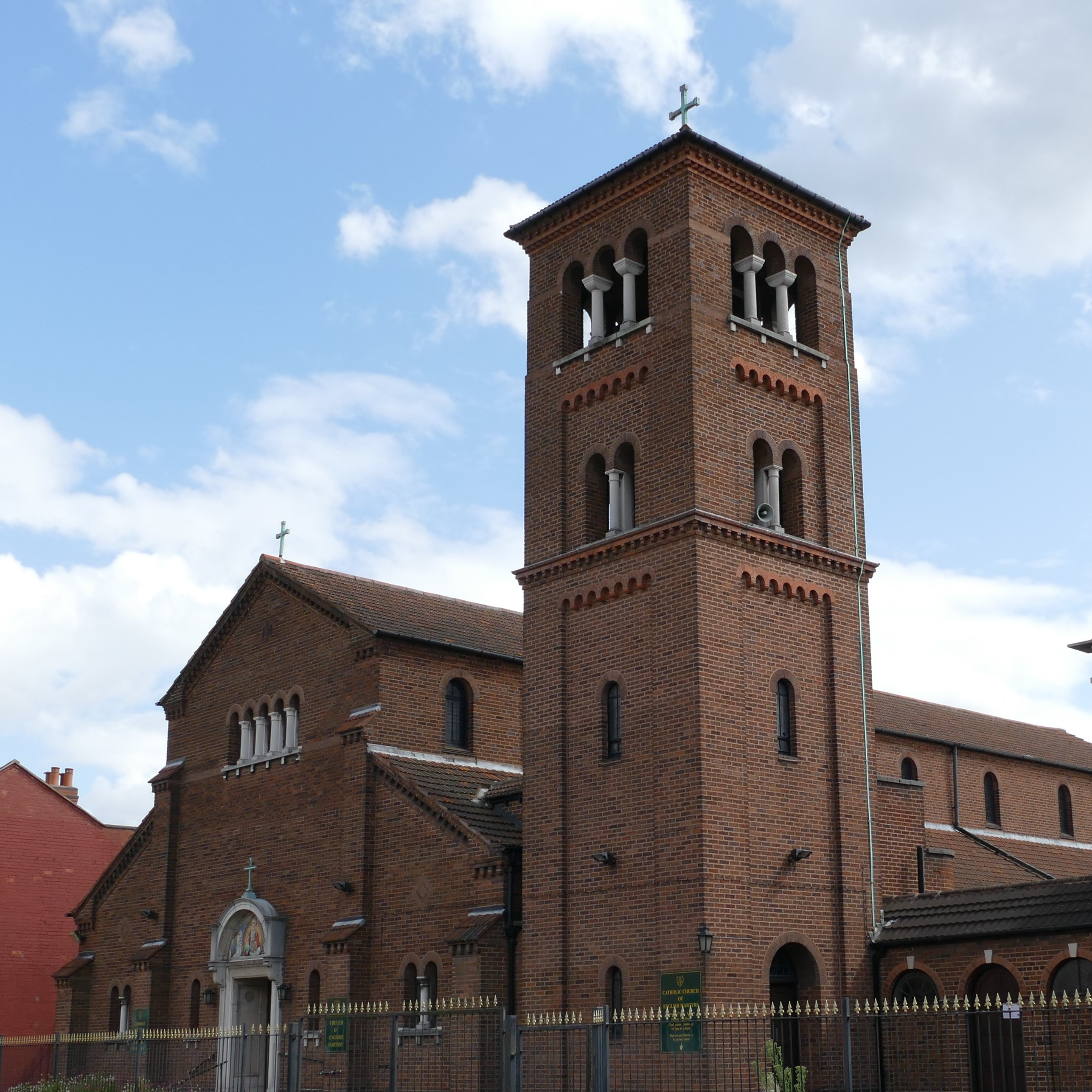
English Martyrs, Sparkhill (1923)

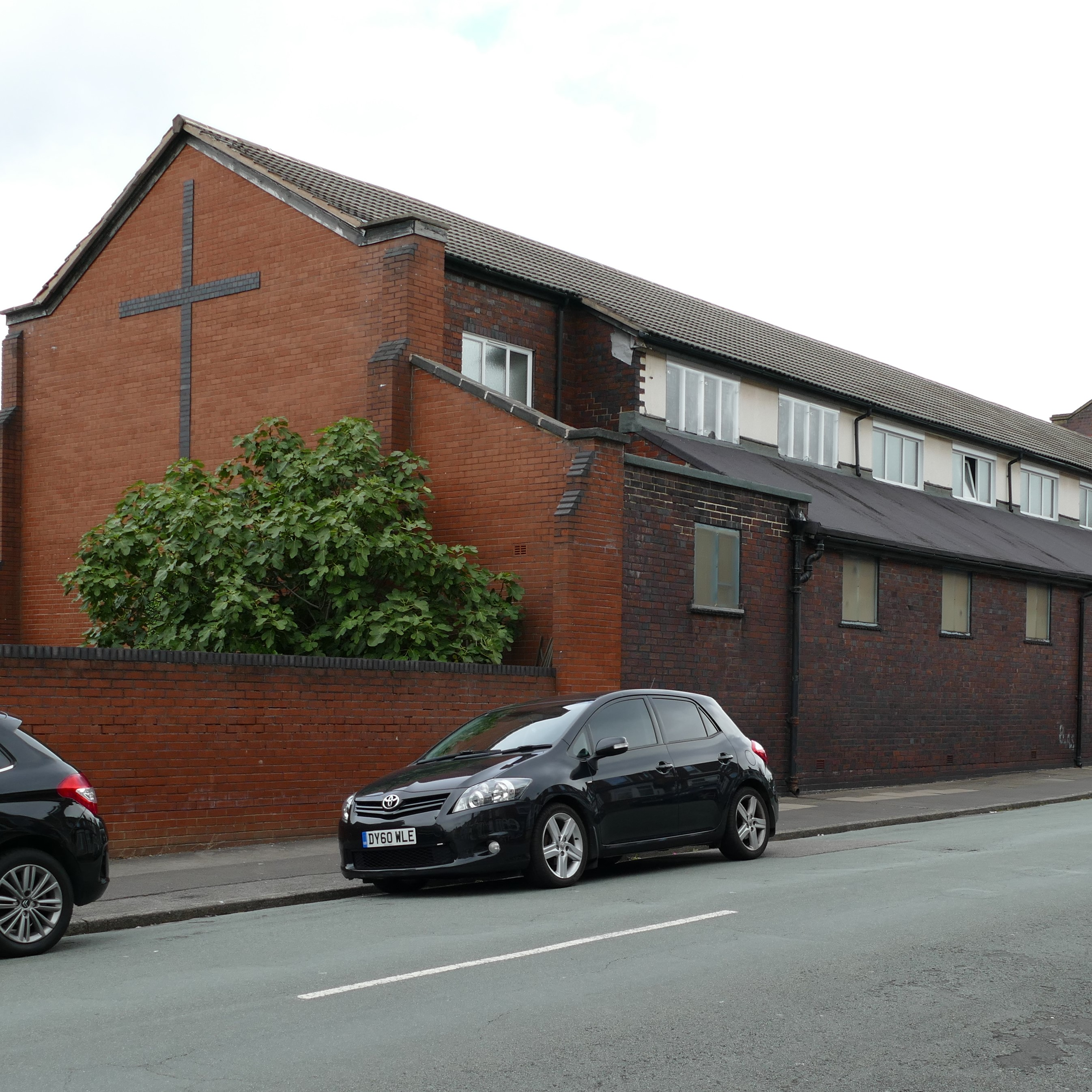
Our Lady of Perpetual Succour, Fenton, Stoke-on-Trent (1924)

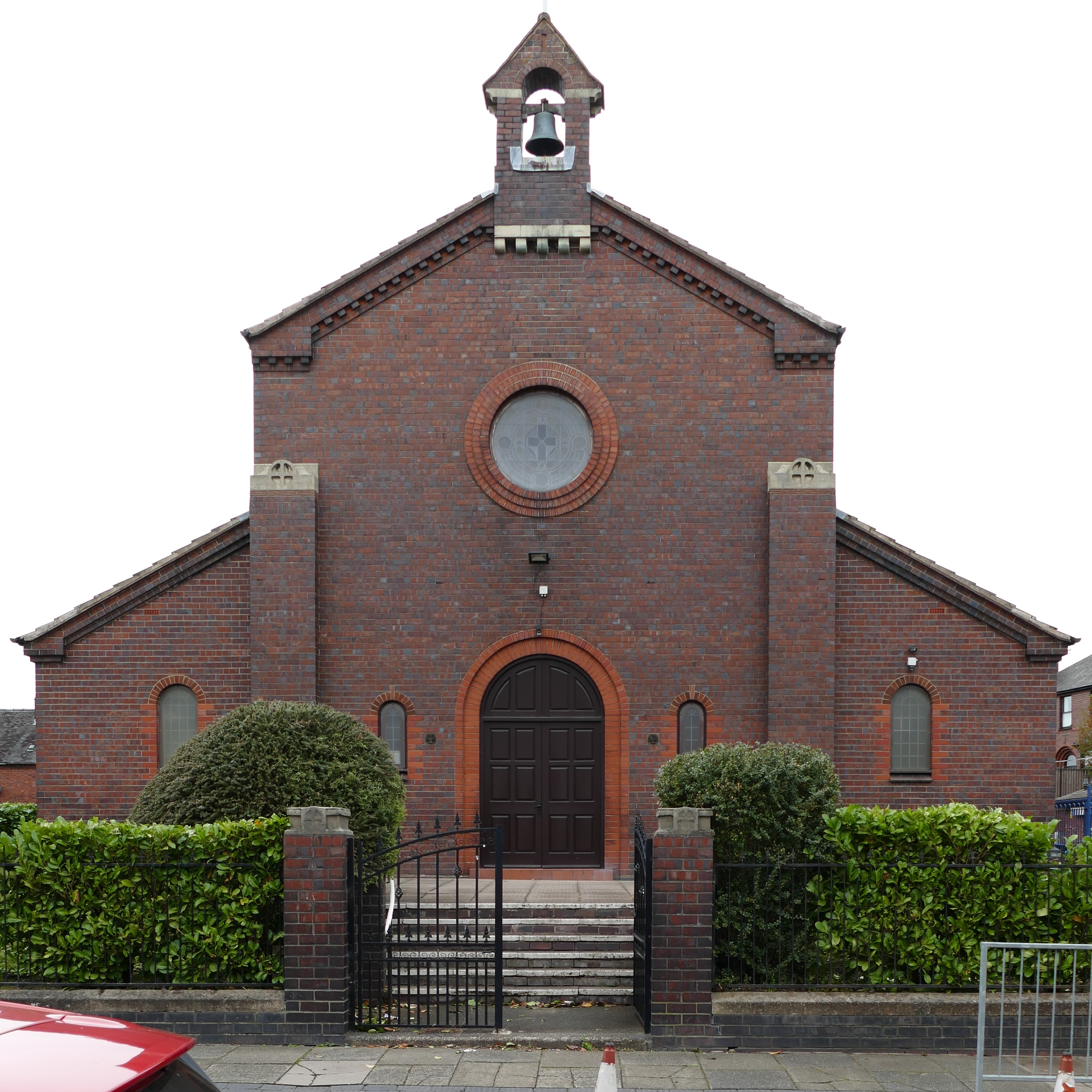
St George and St Martin, Stoke-on-Trent (1928)

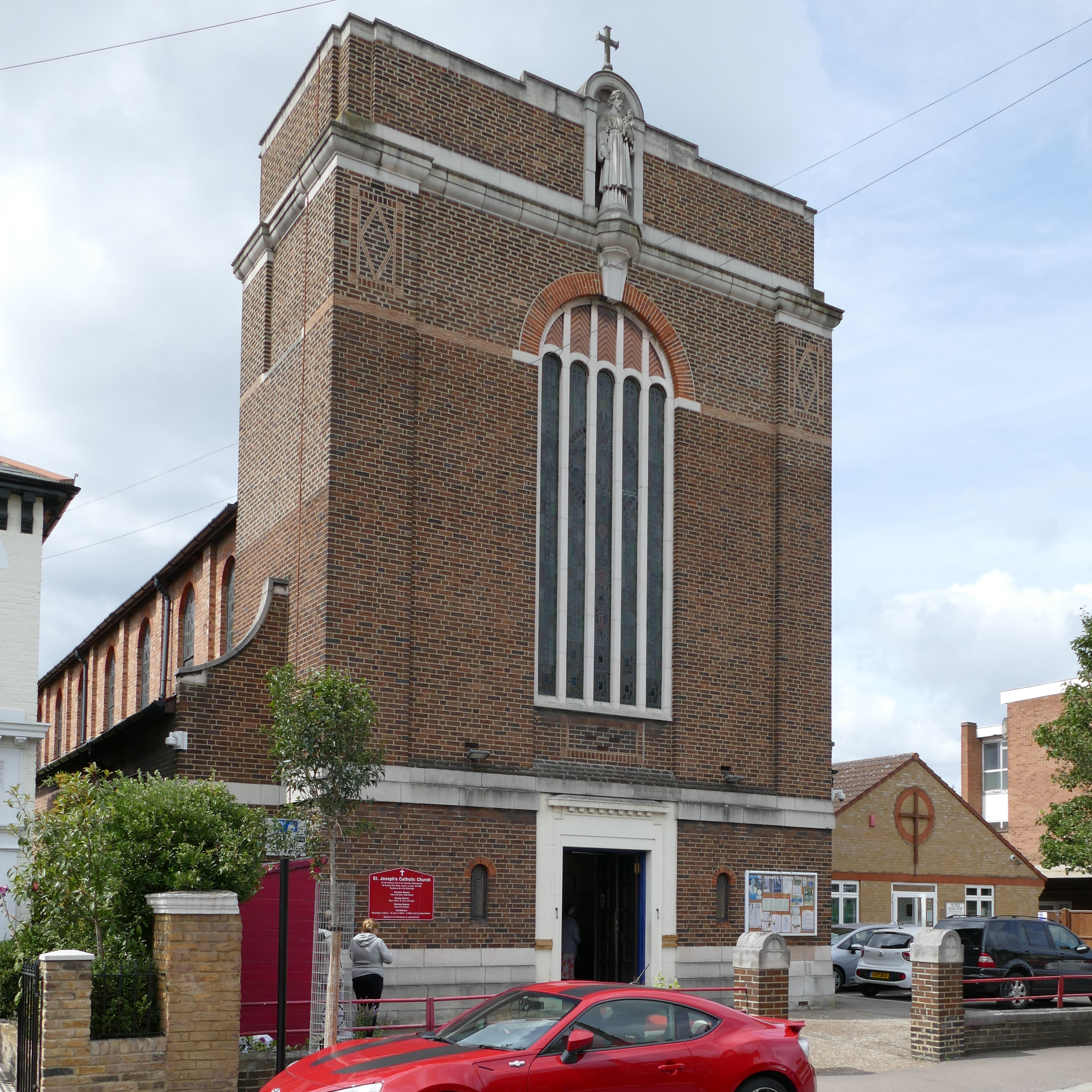
St Joseph's, Leyton (1928)

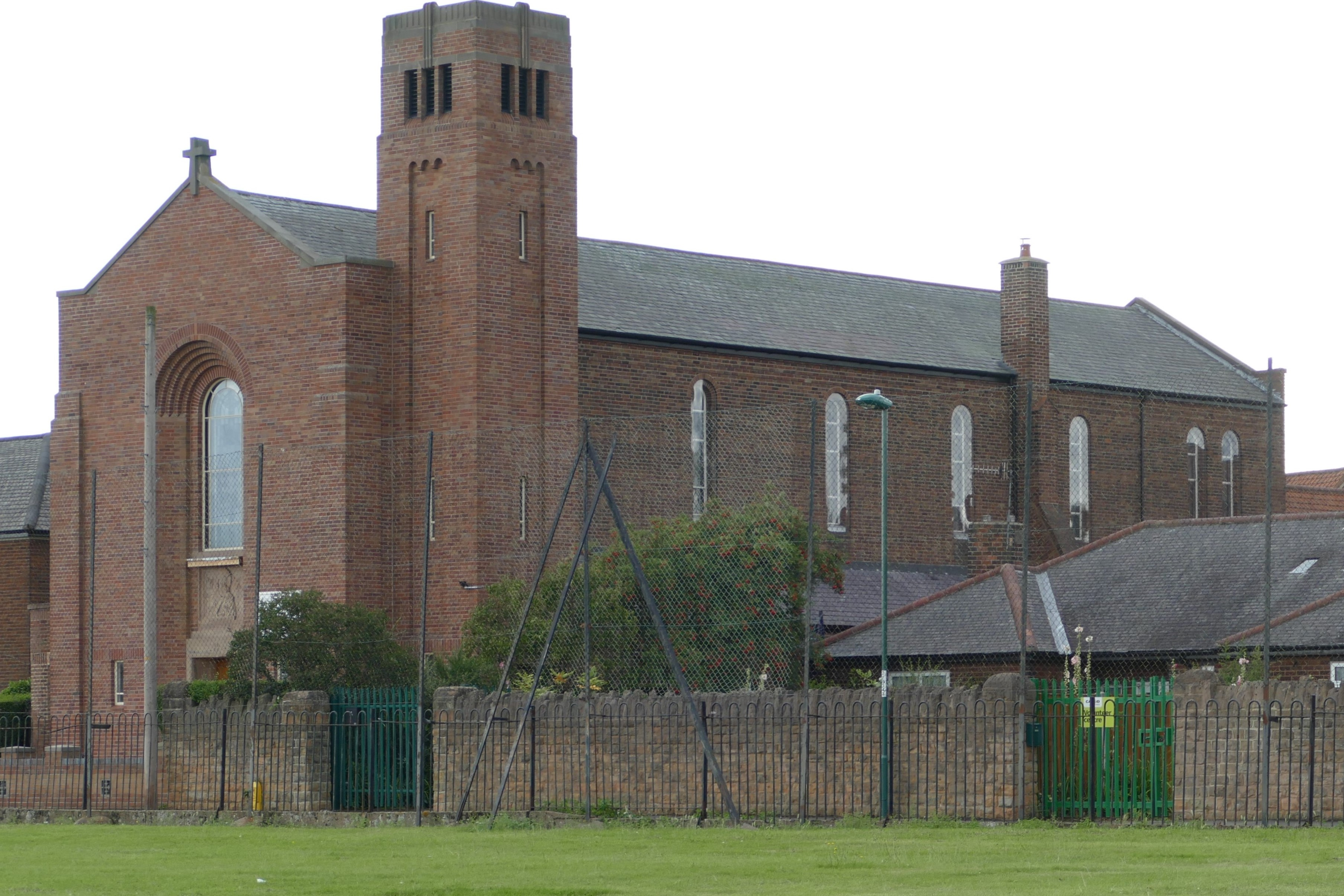
Our Lady of Perpetual Succour, Bulwell (1934)

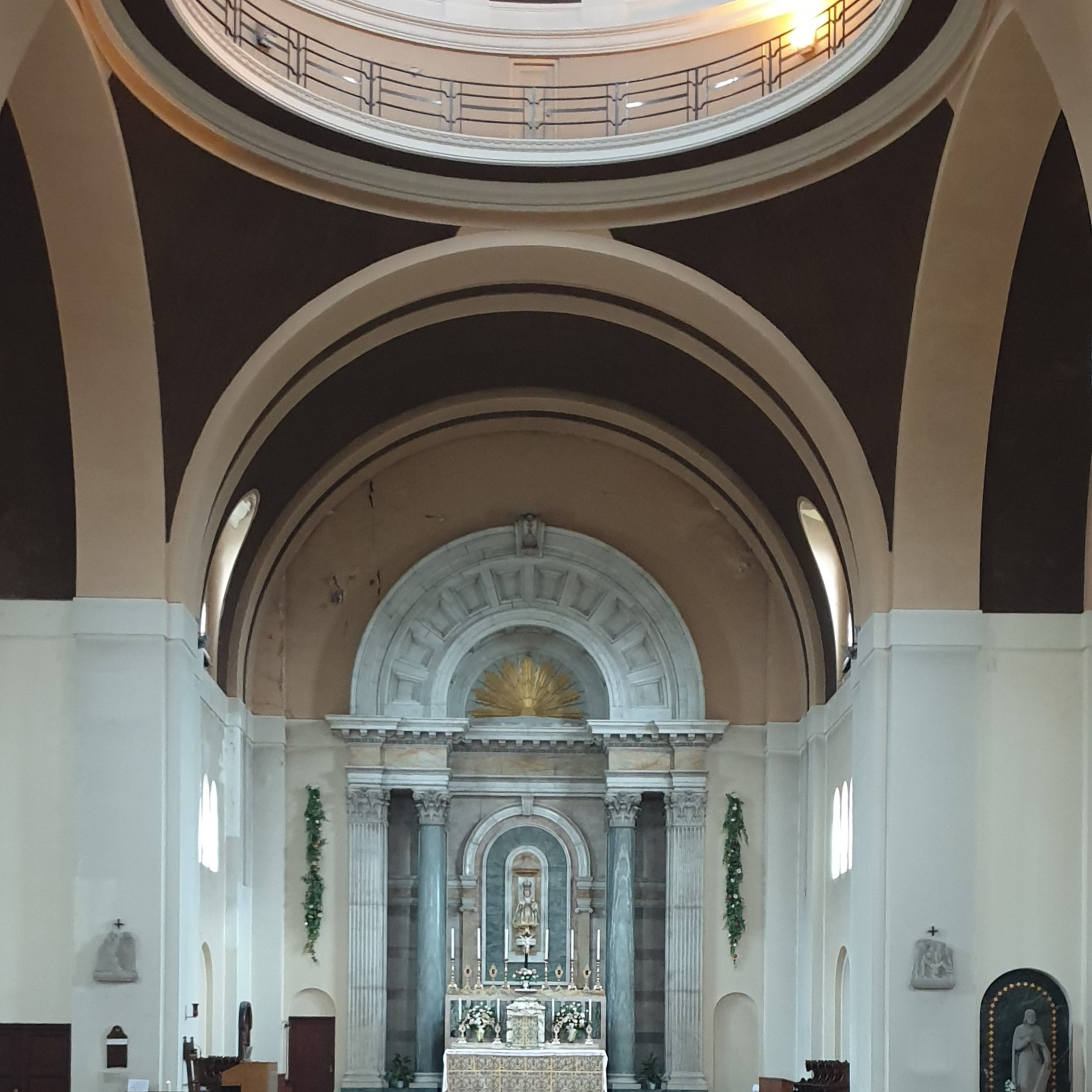
Interior of SS Peter and Paul and St Philomena (1935)

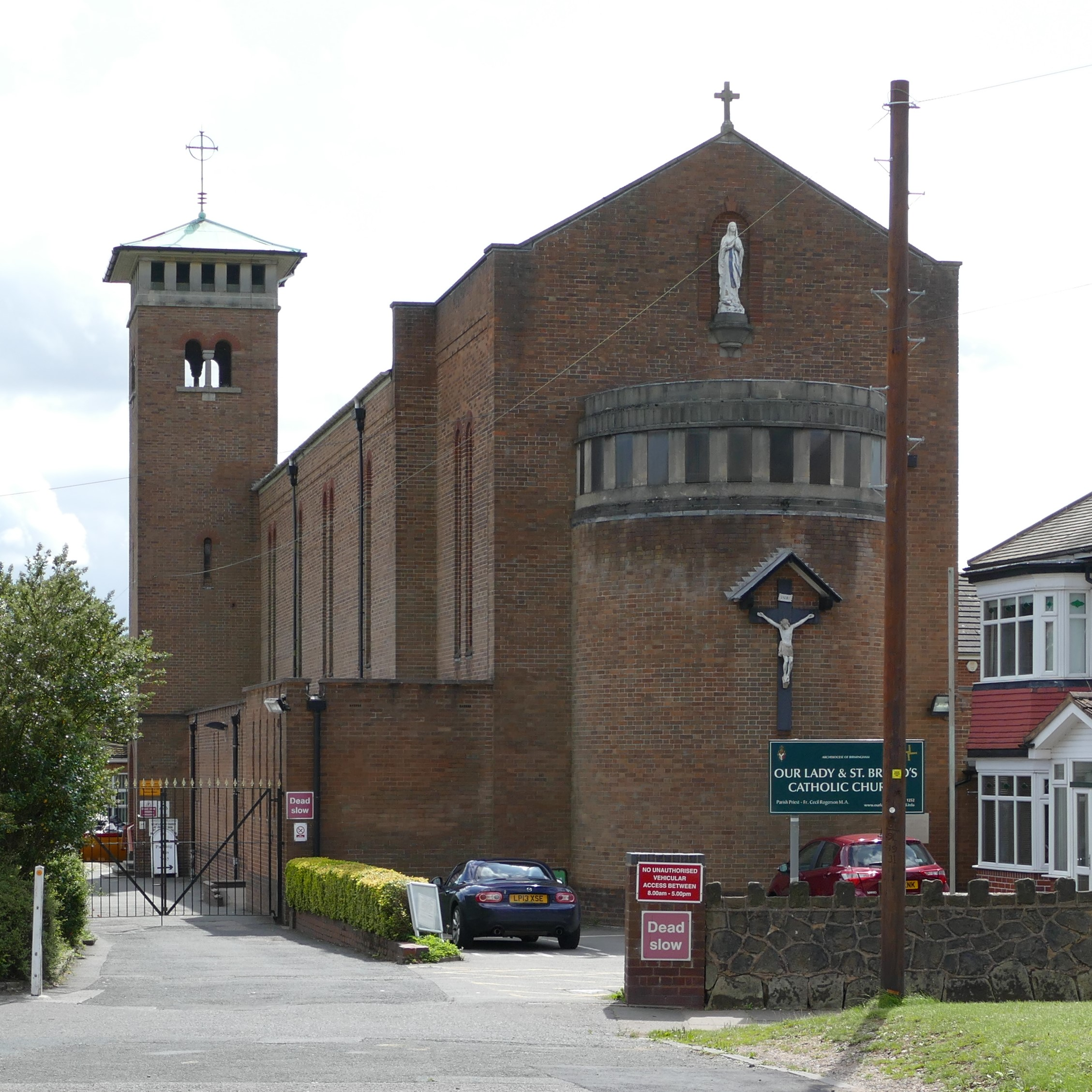
Our Lady and St Brigid, Northfield (1936)

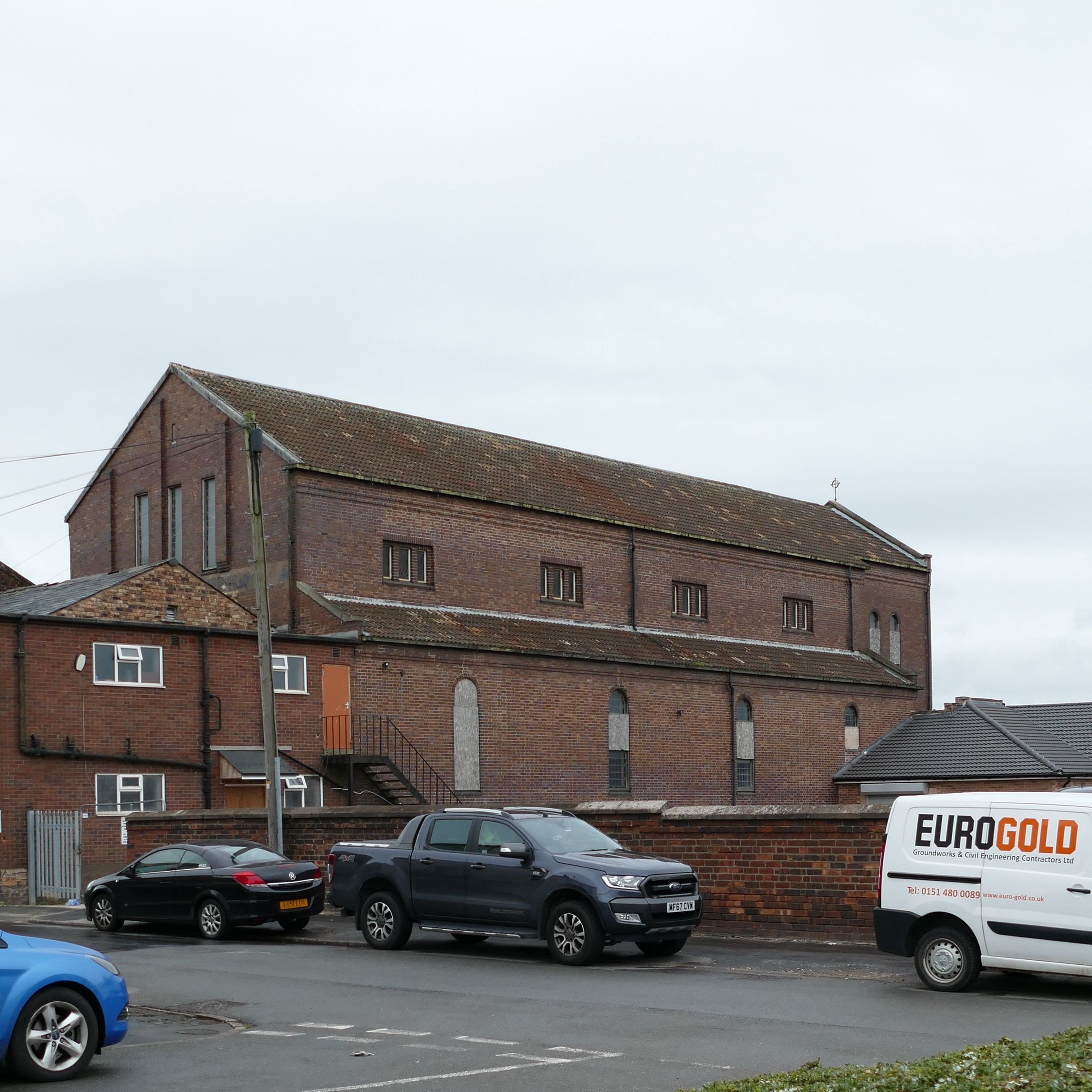
St Peter, Cobridge, Stoke-on-Trent (1937)

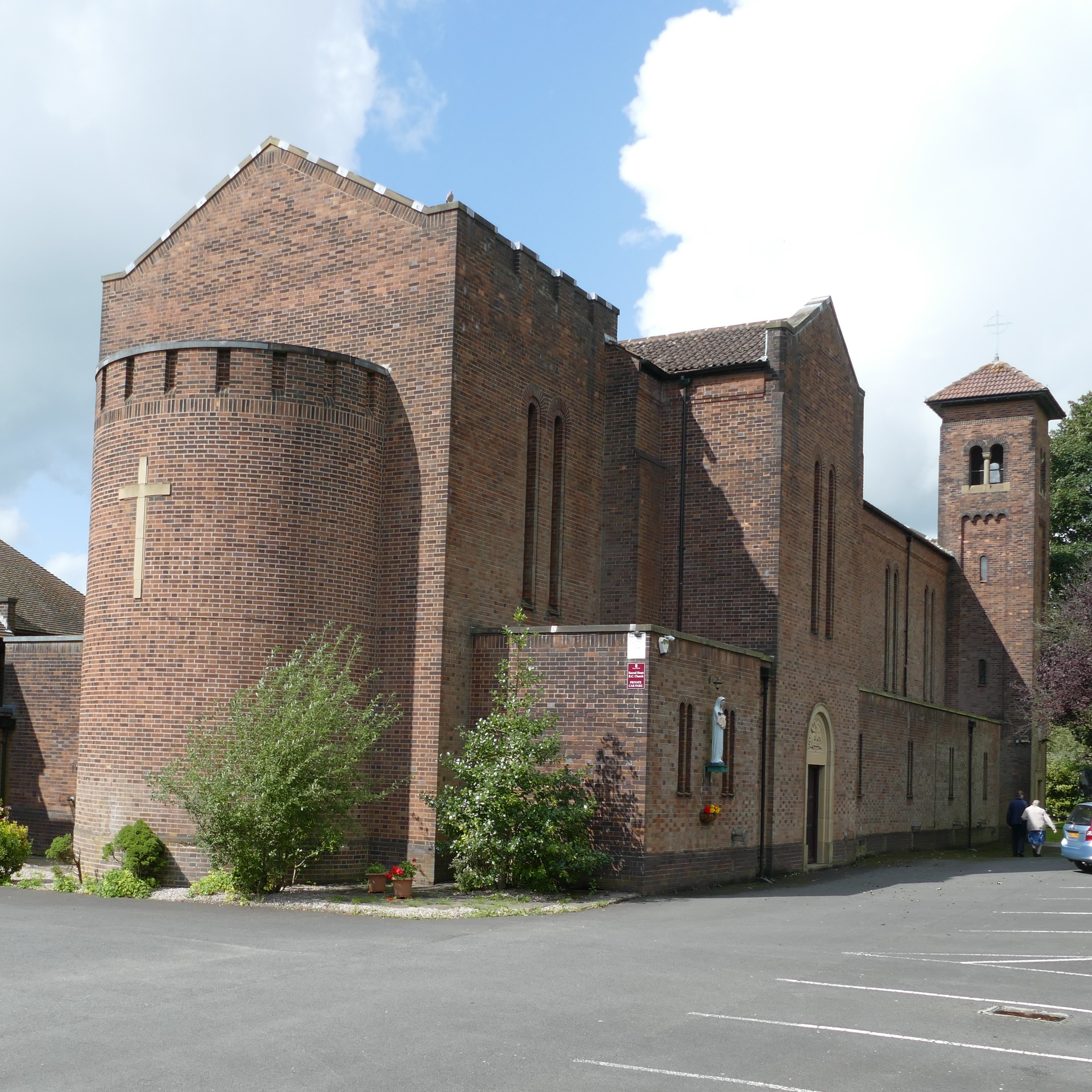
Sacred Heart, Preston (1938)

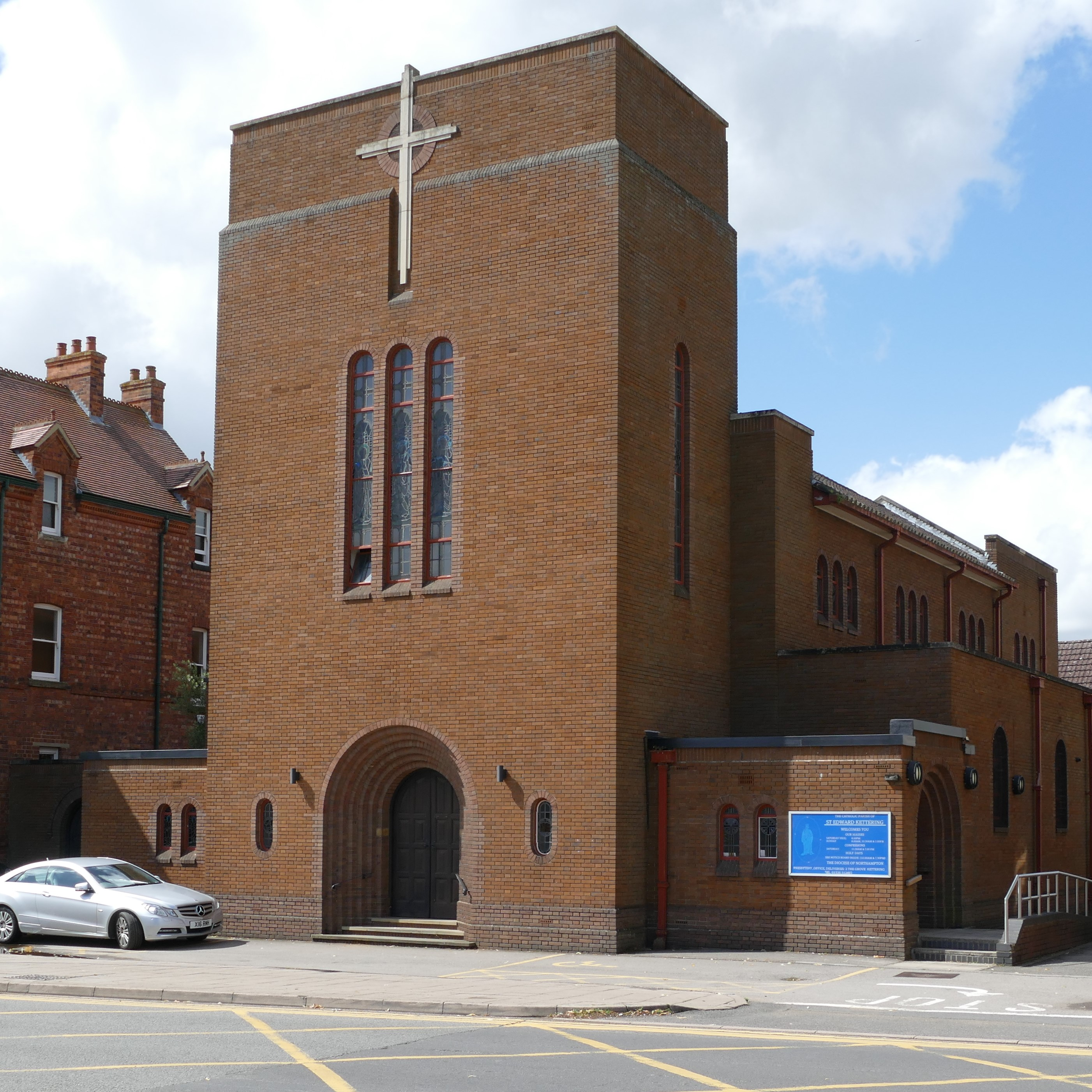
St Edward, Kettering (1940)

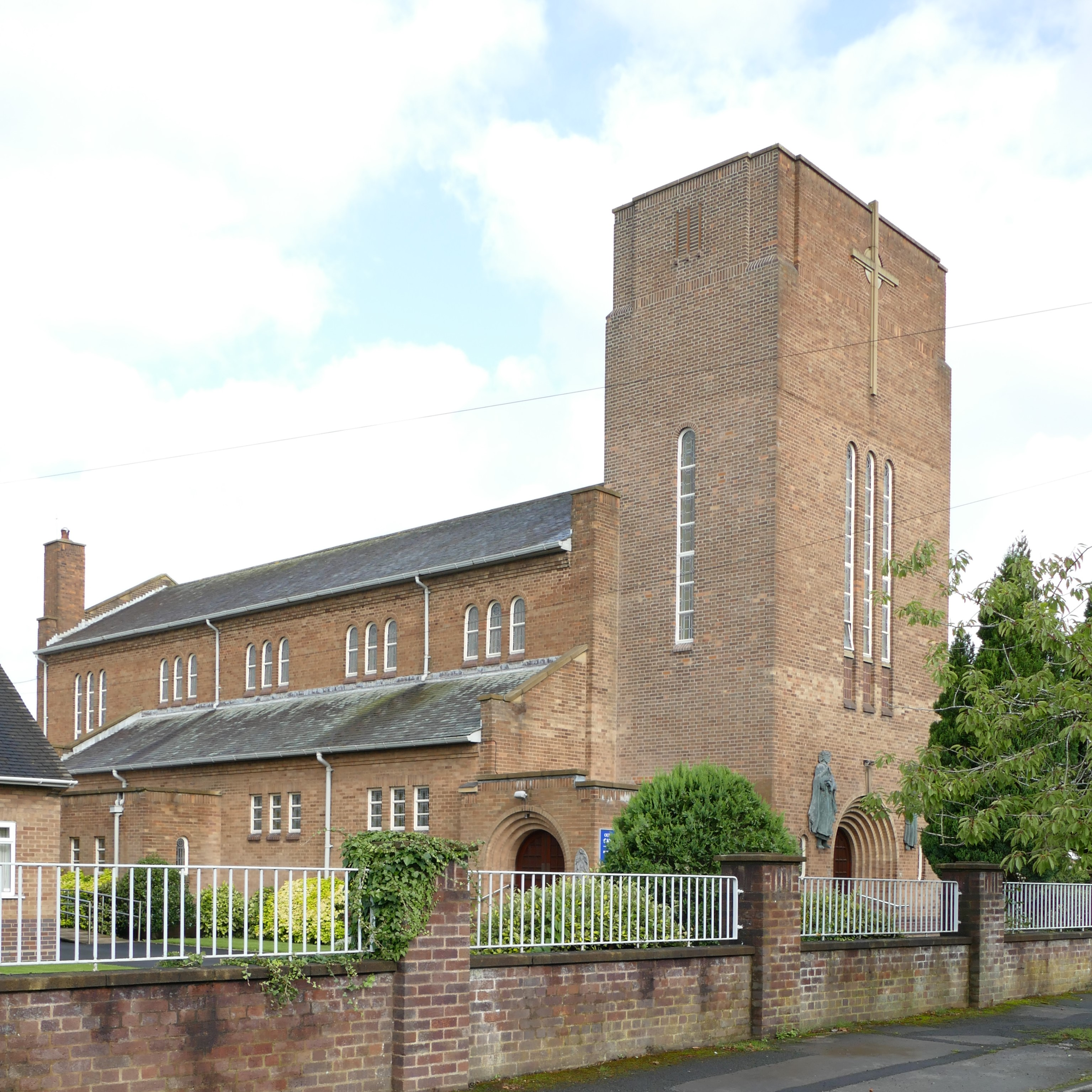
Our Lady and St Edward, Preston (1952)

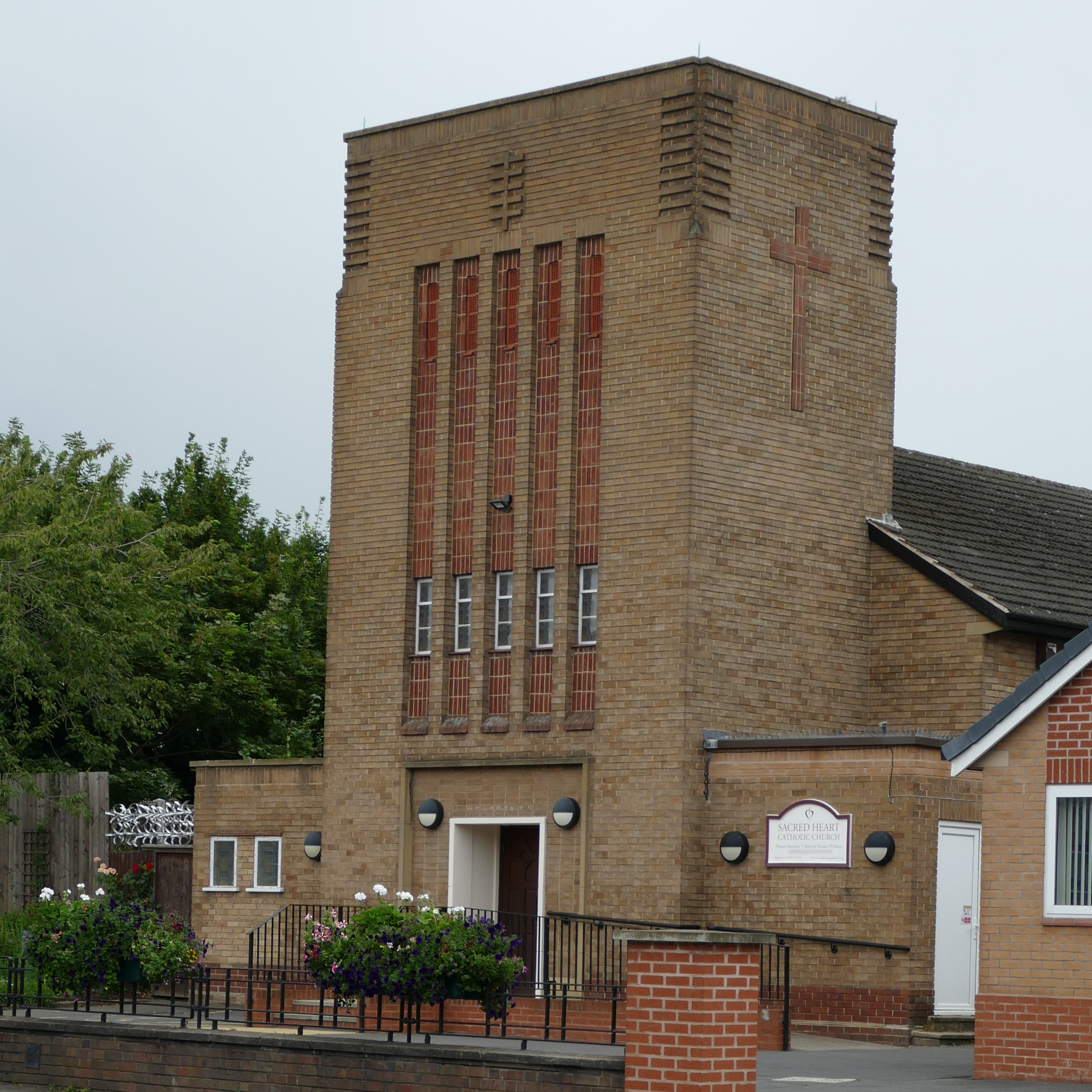
Sacred Heart, Loughborough (1955)

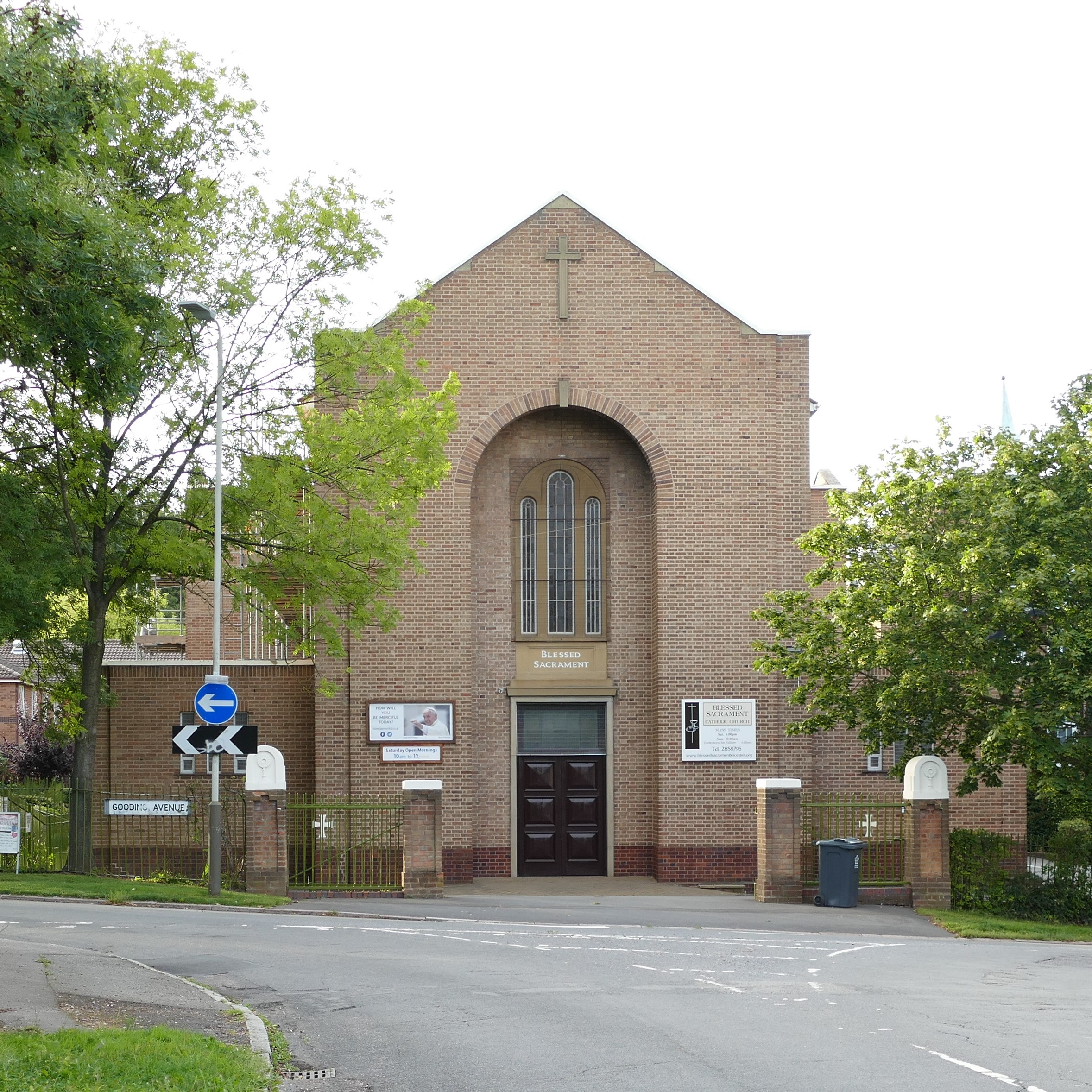
Church of the Blessed Sacrament, Braunstone, Leicester (1956)

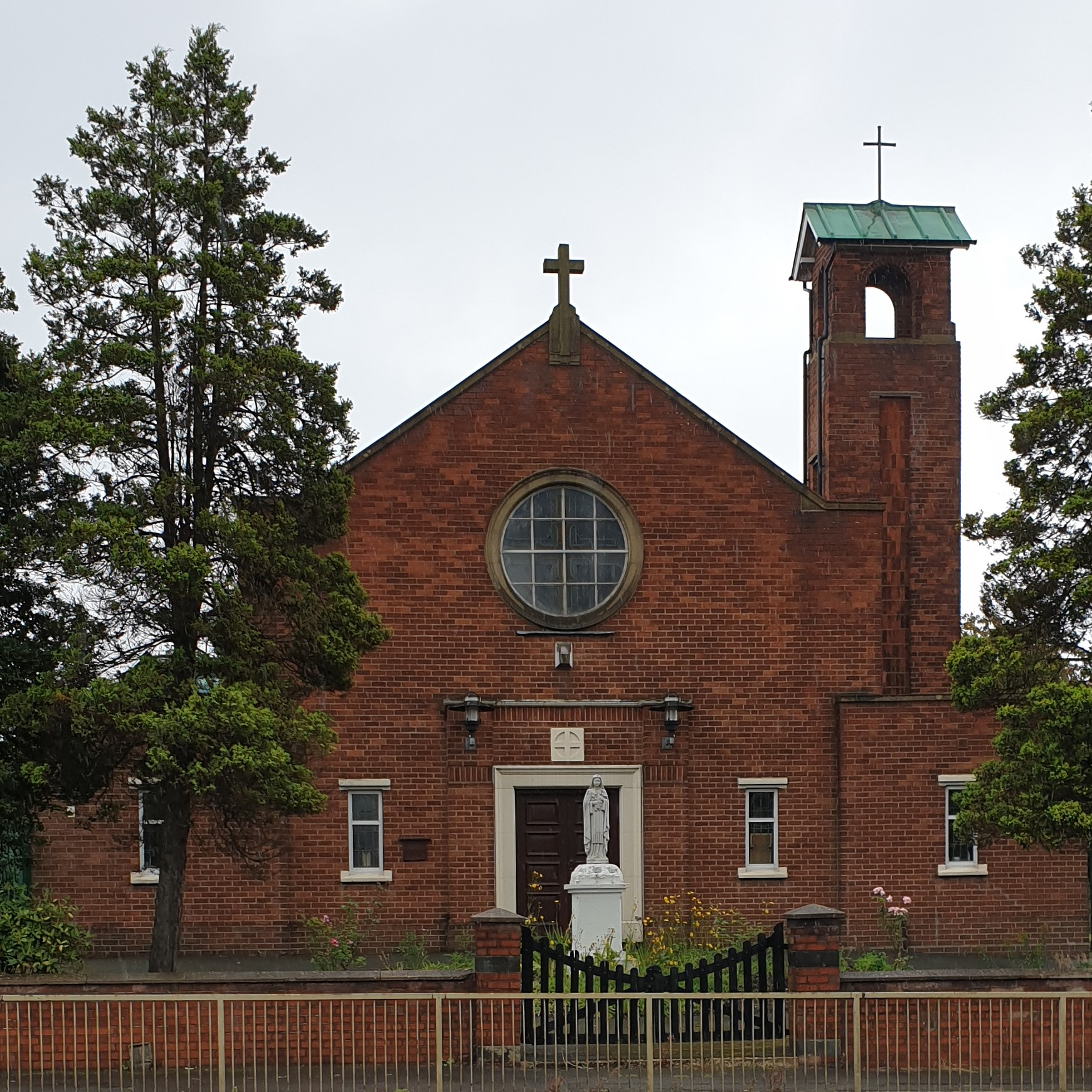
St Teresa of the Child, Stoke-on-Trent (1958)

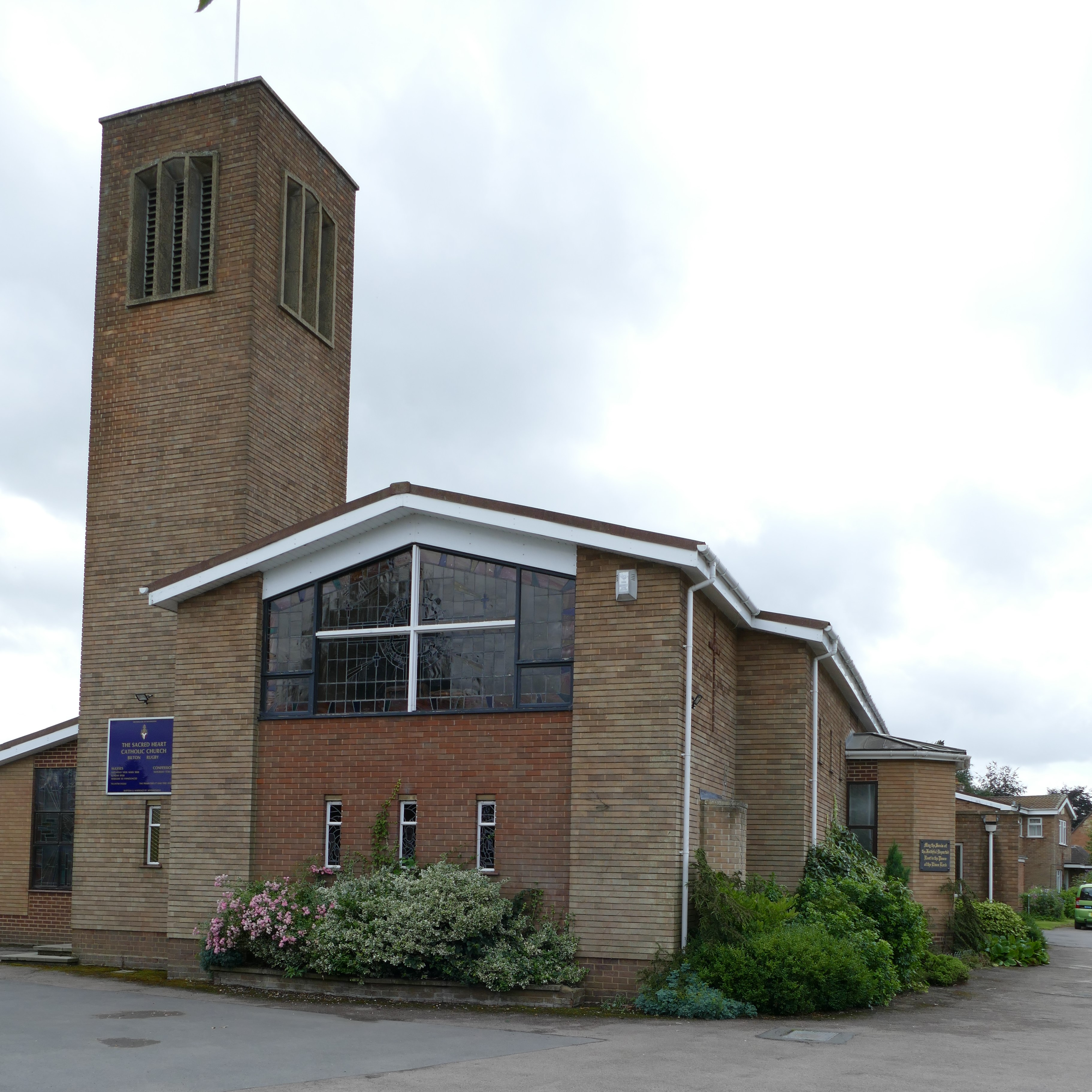
Sacred Heart, Bilton (1959)

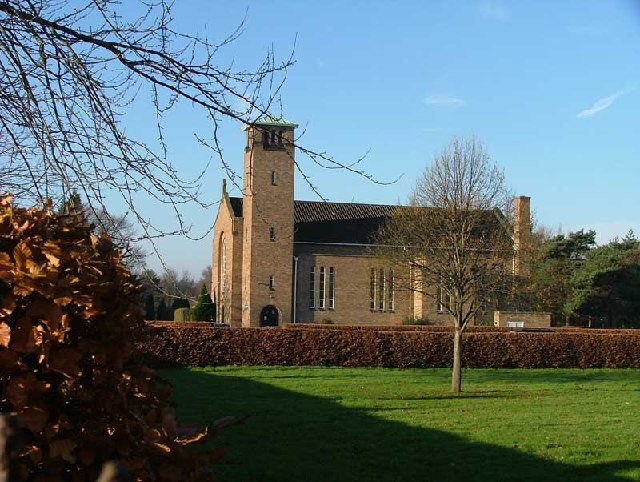
St Joseph Roman Catholic Church, Retford (1959)

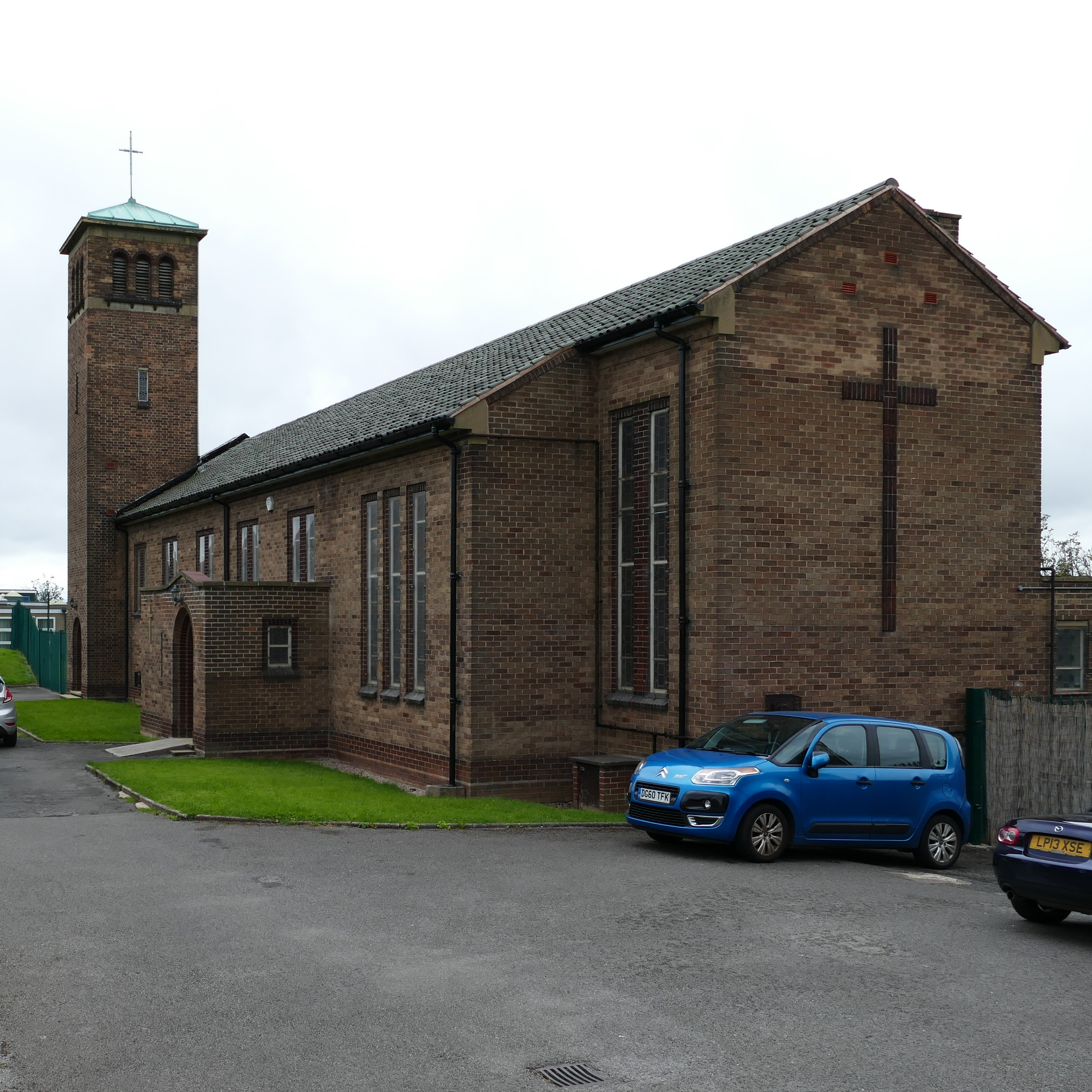
St Maria Goretti, Stoke-on-Trent (1960)

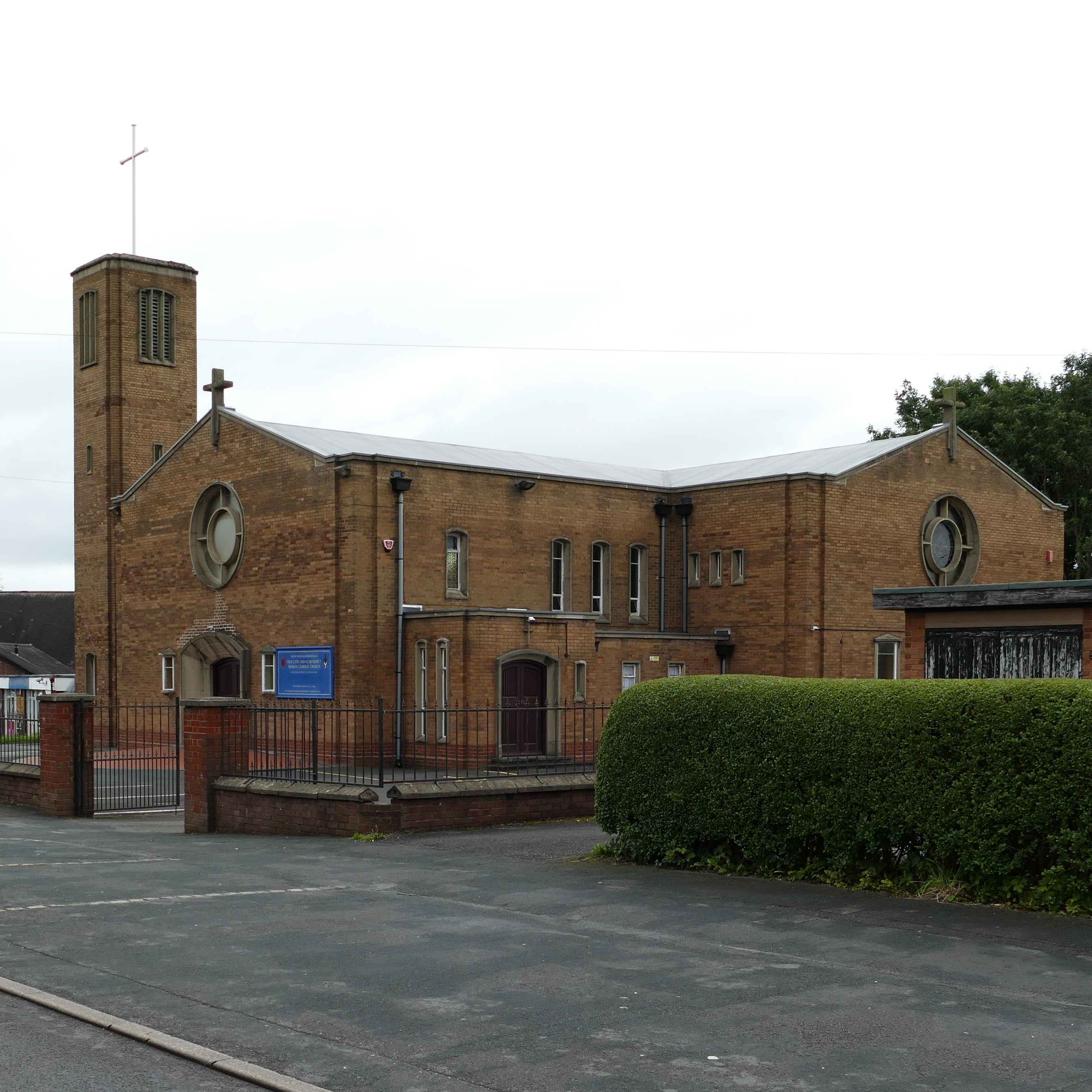
Our Lady and St Benedict, Abbey Hulton (1962)

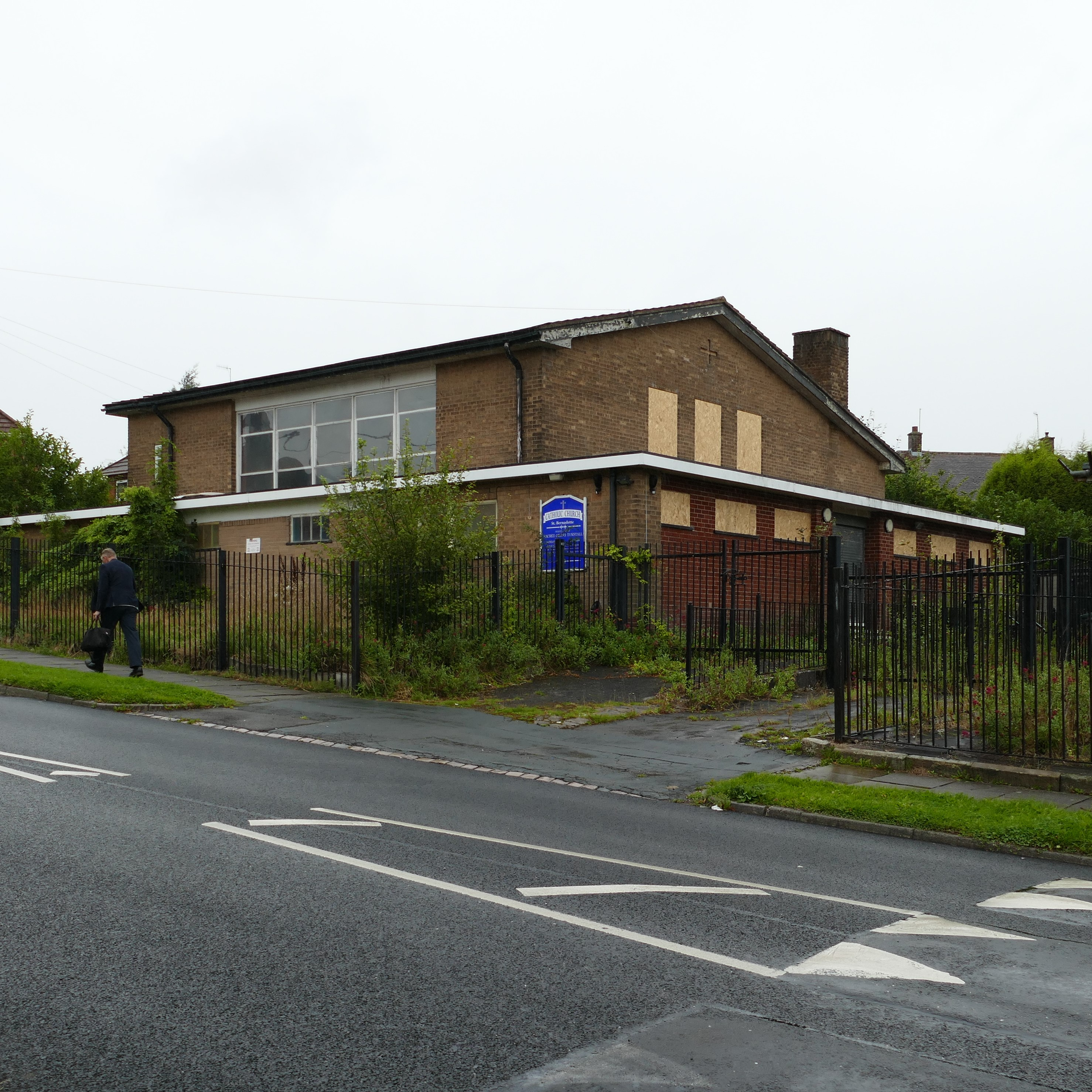
St Bernadette, Fegg Hayes, Stoke-on-Trent (1962)

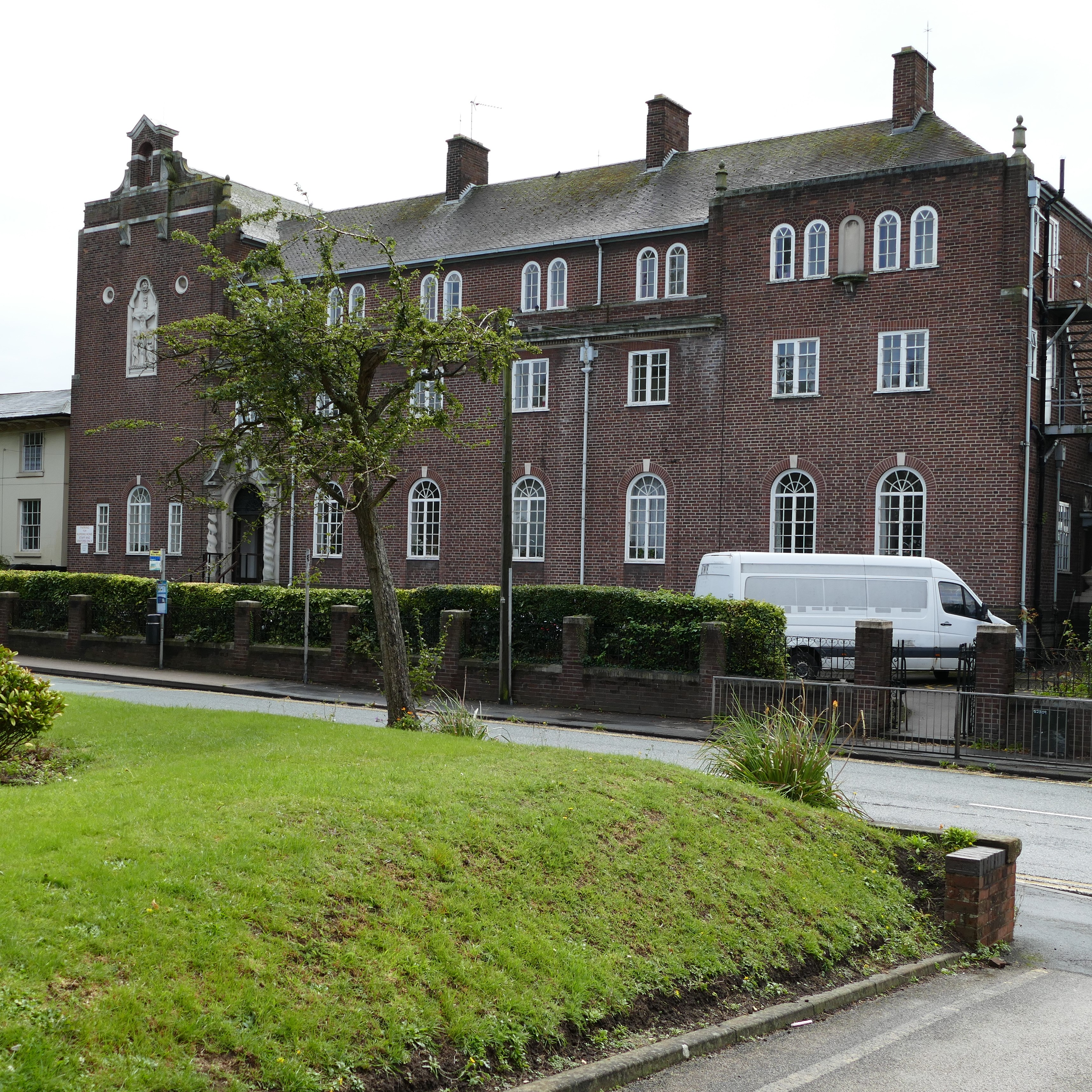
Convent of St. Joseph, Stafford
- Convent of St Paul, Selly Park Rd, Birmingham, Chapel (1914), Attributed to: E. Bower Norris
- St John Baptist, Dowling St, Rochdale (1924), Attributed to: Hill, Sandy and Norris
- St Mary, Cannock (1924), Attributed to: Sandy and Norris
- Our Lady of Perpetual Succour, Fenton, Stoke (1924), Attributed to: Sandy and Norris
- Our Lady and St Wulfstan Convent, Southam, Warks. Chapel (1925), Attributed to: E. Bower Norris and F.M.Reynolds
- St Paul, Birmingham (1928), Attributed to: E. Bower Norris and F.M.Reynolds
- St Joseph, Leyton, LB Waltham Forest (1928), Attributed to: E. Bower Norris and F.M.Reynolds
- St Gerrard, Coleshill, Warks (1928), Attributed to: E. Bower Norris and F.M.Reynolds
- Our Lady of Lourdes, Cambridge Park, Wanstead, LB Waltham Forest (1928), Attributed to: E. Bower Norris and F.M.Reynolds
- St George and St Martin (1928), Attributed to: Sandy and Norris
- Sacred Heart, Wadhurst (1928)
- St Cecilia, Liverpool (1931), Attributed to: E. Bower Norris and F.M.Reynolds
- English Martyrs, Sparkhill (1923), Attributed to: E. Bower Norris and F.M.Reynolds
- St Anne, Blackburn, Lancs (1933), Attributed to: E. Bower Norris and F.M.Reynolds
- Our Lady of Perpetual Succour, Bulwell, Nottingham (1934), Attributed to: Norris and Reynolds
- Our Lady of Perpetual Succour, Wolverhampton (1934), Attributed to: Sandy and Norris
- St John Fisher and St Thomas More, Benchill, Wythenshawe, Manchester (1935), Attributed to: E. Bower Norris and F.M.Reynolds
- SS Peter, Paul and Philomena, Atherton St, Wallasey, Wirral (1935), Attributed to: E. Bower Norris and F.M.Reynolds
- Sacred Heart, N. Walsham, Norfolk (1935), Attributed to: E. Bower Norris and F.M.Reynolds
- St Alphonso, Agnes Rd, Stretford, Manchester (1936), Attributed to: Hill, Sandy and Norris
- St Bernadette, Liverpool (1936), Attributed to: Hill, Sandy and Norris
- Our Lady and St Brigid, Frankley Beeches Rd, Northfield, Birmingham (1936), Attributed to: E. Bower Norris
- St Joseph, Retford, Notts (1936), Attributed to: Sandy and Norris
- St Richard, Longsight, Manchester (1936), Attributed to: Hill, Sandy and Norris
- St Dunstan, Moston Lane, Manchester (1937), Attributed to: E. Bower Norris and F.M.Reynolds
- St Joseph, Waterloo Rd, Burslem, Stoke-on-Trent (1937), Attributed to: E. Bower Norris and F.M.Reynolds
- St Charles, Rishton, Blackburn (1937), Attributed to: Norris and Reynolds
- St Peter, Cobridge, Stoke-on-Trent (1937), Attributed to: Sandy and Norris
- The Precious Blood and All Souls, Coventry (1938), Attributed to: Sandy and Norris
- Holy Name of Jesus, Great Barr (1938), Attributed to: Sandy and Norris
- St Kenigern, Fallowfield, Manchester (1938), Attributed to: Norris and Reynolds
- Sacred Heart, Preston New Road, Blackburn (1938), Attributed to: E. Bower Norris and F.M.Reynolds
- Our Lady of Walsingham, Corby (1939), Attributed to: E. Bower Norris
- Our Lady and St John, Heswall (1939), Attributed to: Norris and Reynolds
- St Ambrose, Stockport (1939), Attributed to: Sandy and Norris
- Sacred Heart, Victoria Road, Tipton, Sandwell, W. Mids. (1940), Attributed to: Sandy and Norris
- St Edward, Kettering (1940), Attributed to: E. Bower Norris
- St Charles Borromeo, Hadfield, Lady chapel (1940), Attributed to: Norris and Reynolds
- St Patrick, Stafford (1951), Attributed to: Sandy and Norris
- Our Lady and St Edward, Preston (1952), Attributed to: E. Bower Norris
- St Thomas More, Debden (1953), Attributed to: Sandy and Norris
- Our Lady of the Angels, East Leake, Loughborough (1954), Attributed to: E. Bower Norris
- Sacred Heart of Jesus, Loughborough (1955), Attributed to: E. Bower Norris
- Blessed Sacrament, Braunstone, Leicester (1956), Attributed to: E. Bower Norris
- St John the Evangailst, Chesterton – Church Hall (1956), Attributed to: Sandy and Norris
- Ratcliffe College, Ratcliffe-on-the-Wreake, Leics (1957), Attributed to: Sandy and Norris
- St John Vianney, Blackpool (1958), Attributed to: Sandy and Norris
- St Teresa of the Child, Stoke-on-Trent (1958), Extended in 1958 by Sandy and Norris
- St Joseph's, Retford, Notts (1959)
- Convent building for Our Lady and St Wulsan (1959), Attributed to: Sandy and Norris
- Sacred Heart, Bilton, Warks (1959), Attributed to: E. Bower Norris and F.M.Reynolds. Taking stock says Sandy & Norris DOUBLE CHECK THIS!!
- St Joseph the Worker, Sutton-in-Ashfield, Notts (1959)
- St Augustine of Cantebury, Meir (1959), Attributed to: Sandy and Norris
- Our Lady of Perpetual Succour, Rendal (1960), Attributed to: Sandy and Norris
- St Maria Goretti, Stoke (1960), Attributed to: Sandy and Norris
- Our Lady of the Assumption, Blackpool (1961), Attributed to: Sandy and Norris
- Our Lady and St Benedict, Abbey Hulton (1962), Attributed to: Sandy and Norris
- St Joseph, Darlaston – hall-cum-chapel-of-ease (1962), Attributed to: Sandy and Norris
- St Bernadette, Fegg Hayes, Stoke (1962), Attributed to: Sandy and Norris
- Our Lady of Perpetual Succour, Barton-under-Needwood (1963), Attributed to: Sandy and Norris
- Our Lady of Windermere and St Herbert, Windermere (1964), Attributed to: Sandy and Norris
- English Martyrs, Hillmorton (1965), Attributed to: Sandy and Norris
- St Mary, Norton-le-Moors, Stoke (1968), Attributed to: Cyril Horsley of Sandy & Norris & Partners
- Our Lady and St Pius X, Habberley (1970), Attributed to: Sandy and Norris
- St John Fisher, West Heath, West Midlands (1964), Attributed to: E. Bower Norris, assisted by E. Roestenburg
- Renaissance Convent Chapel of St. Joseph, Stafford
- English Martyrs, Whalley Range, Manchester, renovation work to existing church

=== Awaiting confirmation ===
- St Thomas of Cantebury, Tean (1938), Attributed to: Sandy and Norris
- St Edward the Confessor, Macclesfield (1939), Attributed to: Reynolds, of Norris and Reynolds

== Other buildings ==
- Lotus Shoe Factory, Stafford
- School – Besford Court, now divided into houses (1926 and 31)
- School – St Peters, Rock Hill, Bromsgrove (1931)
- 23–24 Bennetts Hill, Birmingham (1961)

== Sources ==
- Anson, Peter (May 1938). "The Churches of Ernest Bower Norris F.R.I.B.A.". Art Notes. Vol. VII. pp. 67–73.
- Brooks, Alan; Pevsner, Nikolaus (2007). Worcestershire ([Rev. and expanded ed.] ed.). New Haven: Yale University Press. p. 33. ISBN 978-0-300-11298-6. OCLC 124955186.
- Foster, Andy (2005). Birmingham. Pevsner Architectural Guides. New Haven: Yale University Press. ISBN 0-300-10731-5.
- Proctor, Robert (2014). Building the modern church: Roman Catholic Church architecture in Britain, 1955 to 1975. Burlington, VT: Ashgate. p. 65. ISBN 978-1-4094-4916-4. OCLC 874584604.
